= Mithraism =

Mystery religion in the Roman Empire

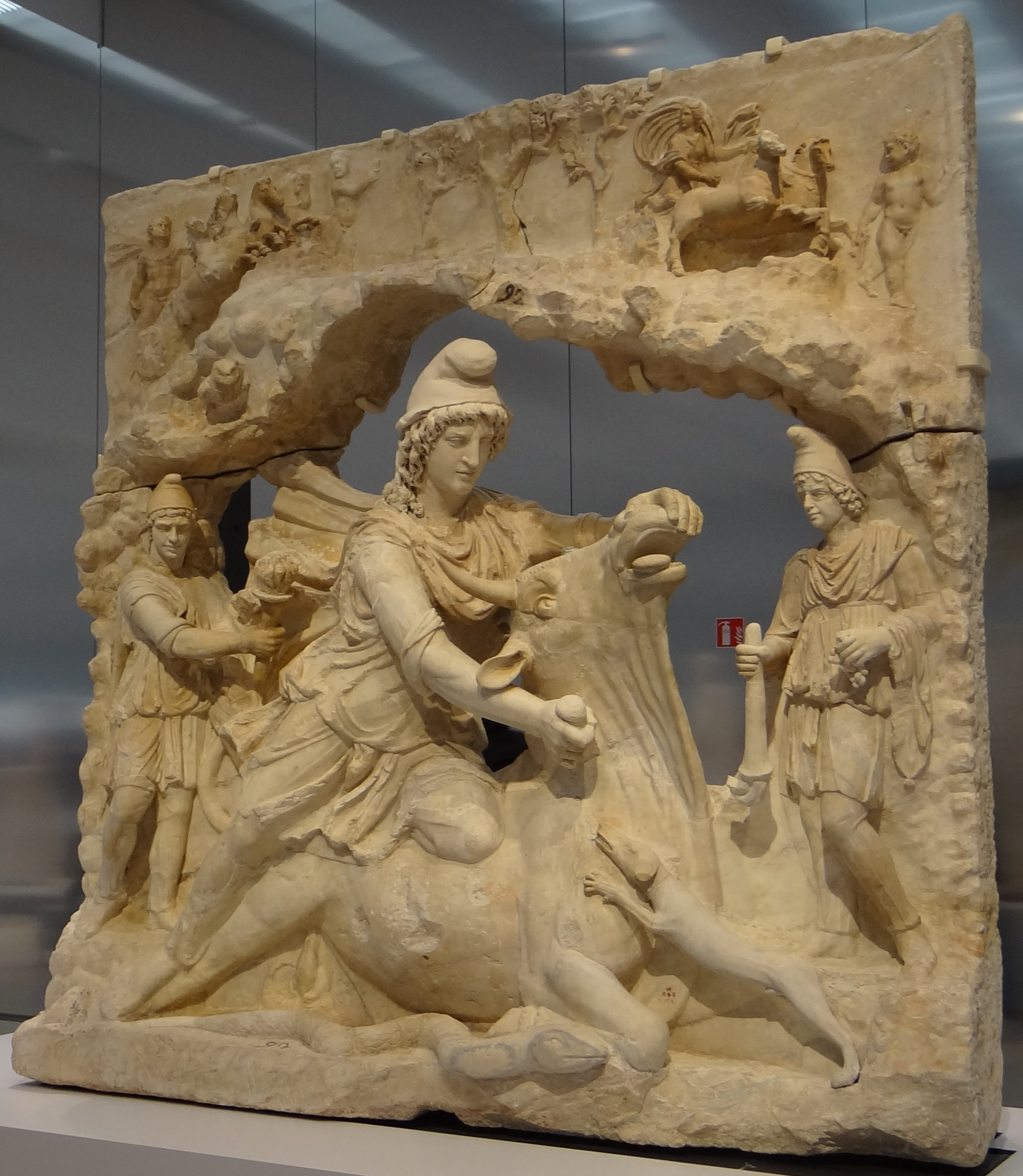
Mithras killing the bull, c. 150 CE; Louvre-Lens

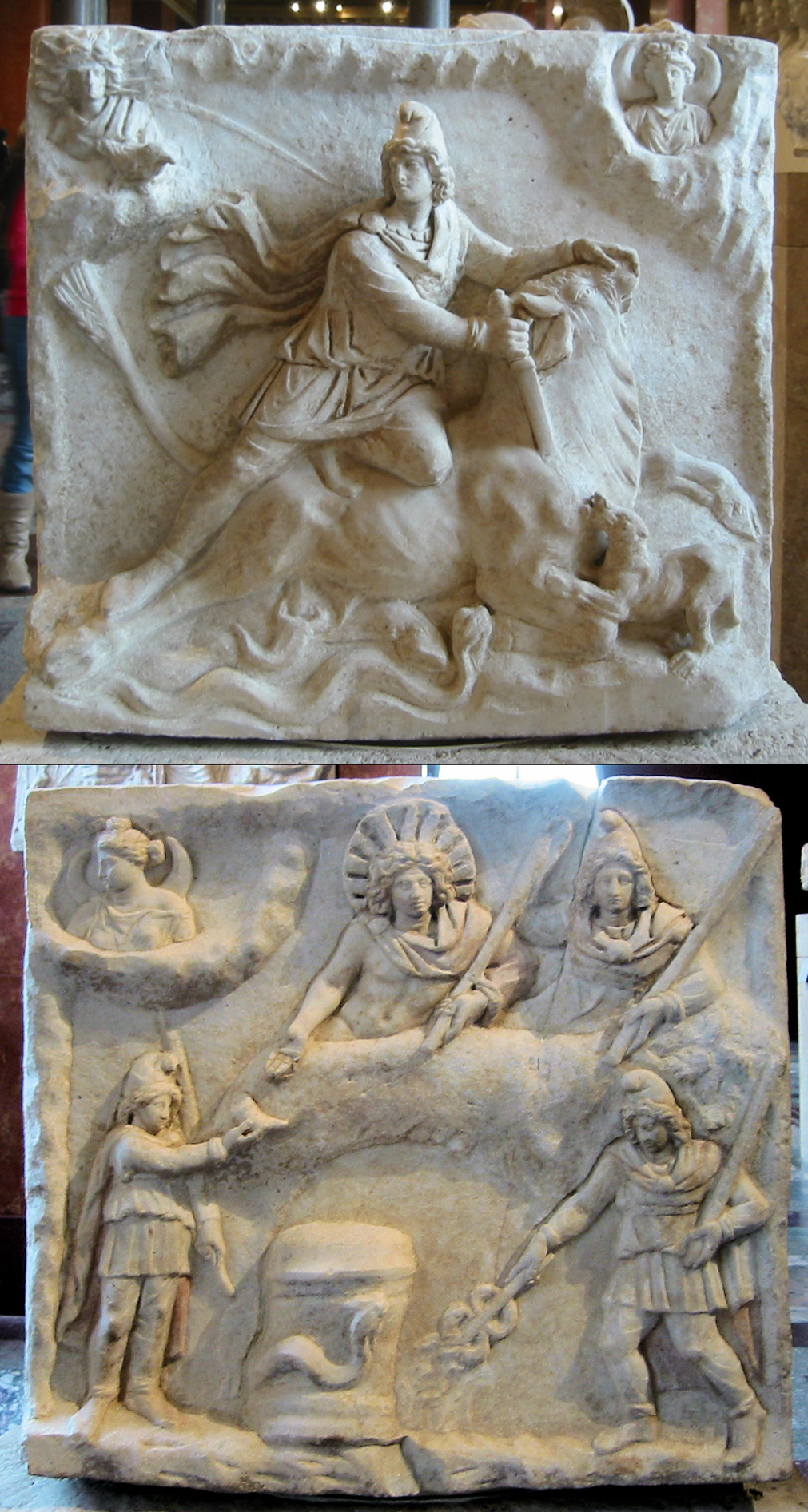
Double-faced Mithraic relief. Fiano Romano (Rome), 2nd to 3rd century CE, Louvre Museum.

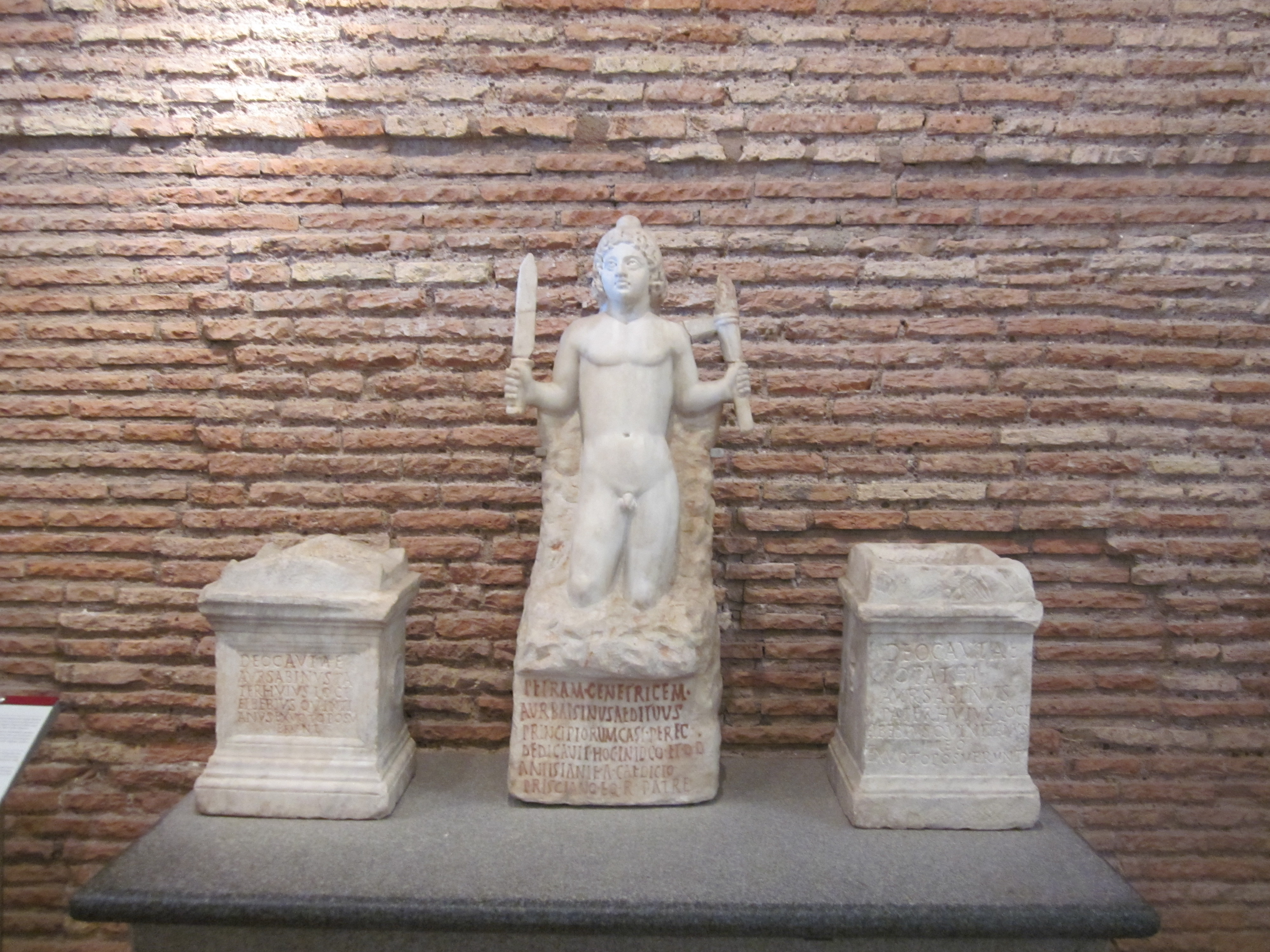
Rock-born Mithras and Mithraic artifacts, Baths of Diocletian, Rome

Mithraism, also known as the Mithraic mysteries or the Cult of Mithras, was a Roman mystery religion focused on the god Mithras. Although inspired by Iranian worship of the Zoroastrian divinity (yazata) Mithra, the Roman Mithras was linked to a new and distinctive imagery, and the degree of continuity between Persian and Greco-Roman practice remains debatable. (Note: "The term "Mithraism" is of course a modern coinage: In antiquity the cult was known as "the mysteries of Mithras"; alternatively, as "the mysteries of the Persians". ... The Mithraists, who were manifestly not Persians in any ethnic sense, thought of themselves as cultic "Persians". ... the ancient Roman Mithraists themselves were convinced that their cult was founded by none other than Zoroaster, who "dedicated to Mithras, the creator and father of all, a cave in the mountains bordering Persia", an idyllic setting "abounding in flowers and springs of water"."(Porphyry, On the Cave of the Nymphs, 6)) The mysteries were popular among the Imperial Roman army from the 1st to the 4th century AD.

Worshippers of Mithras had a complex system of seven grades of initiation and communal ritual meals. Initiates called themselves syndexioi, those "united by the handshake". (Note: "That the hand-shaken might make their vows joyfully forever". — Clauss (2000).) They met in dedicated mithraea (singular mithraeum), temples underground, in caves, that survive in large numbers. The cult appears to have had its centre in Rome, and was popular throughout the western half of the empire, as far south as Roman Africa and Numidia, as far east as Roman Dacia, as far north as Roman Britain, and to a lesser extent in Roman Syria in the east.

Mithraism is viewed as a rival of early Christianity. In the 4th century, Mithraists faced persecution from Christians, and the religion was subsequently suppressed and eliminated in the Roman Empire by the end of the century.

Numerous archaeological finds, including meeting places, monuments, and artifacts, have contributed to modern knowledge about Mithraism throughout the Roman Empire. (Note: "We know a good deal about them because archaeology has disinterred many meeting places together with numerous artifacts and representations of the cult myth, mostly in the form of relief sculpture" — Beck (2011).) The iconic scenes of Mithras show him being born from a rock, slaughtering a bull, and sharing a banquet with the god Sol (the Sun). About 420 sites have yielded materials related to the cult. Among the items found are about 1000 inscriptions, 700 examples of the bull-killing scene (tauroctony), and about 400 other monuments. It has been estimated that there would have been at least 680 mithraea in the city of Rome. No written narratives or theology from the religion survive; limited information can be derived from the inscriptions and brief or passing references in Greek and Latin literature. Interpretation of the physical evidence remains problematic and contested. (Note: ... in the absence of any ancient explanations of its meaning, Mithraic iconography has proven to be exceptionally difficult to decipher. — Ulansey (1991))

== Name ==
The term "Mithraism" is a modern convention. Writers of the Roman era referred to it by phrases such as "Mithraic mysteries", "mysteries of Mithras" or "mysteries of the Persians". (Note: "After this, Celsus, desiring to exhibit his learning in his treatise against us, quotes also certain Persian mysteries, where he says: 'These things are obscurely hinted at in the accounts of the Persians, and especially in the mysteries of Mithras, which are celebrated among them ...' " Chapter 24: "After the instance borrowed from the Mithraic mysteries, Celsus declares that he who would investigate the Christian mysteries, along with the aforesaid Persian, will, on comparing the two together, and on unveiling the rites of the Christians, see in this way the difference between them".) Modern sources sometimes refer to the Roman religion as Roman Mithraism or Western Mithraism to distinguish it from Persian worship of Mithra. (Note: "For most of the twentieth century, the major problem addressed by scholarship on both Roman Mithraism and the Iranian god Mithra was the question of continuity.")

== Etymology ==
The name Mithras (Latin, equivalent to Greek Μίθρας) is a form of Mithra, the name of an old, pre-Zoroastrian, and, later on, Zoroastrian, god (Note: It is therefore highly likely that it was in the context of Mithridates' alliance with the Cilician pirates that there arose the synchretistic link between Perseus and Mithra which led to the name Mithras (a Greek form of the name Mithra) being given to the god of the new cult. — D. Ulansey (1991)) (Note: ... Mithra is the next most important deity and may even have occupied a position of near equality with Ahura Mazde. He was associated with the Sun, and in time the name Mithra became a common word for "Sun". Mithra functioned preeminently in the ethical sphere; he was the god of the covenant, who oversaw all solemn agreements that people made among themselves ... In later times Mithra gave his name to Mithraism, a mystery religion.) – a relationship understood by Mithraic scholars since the days of Franz Cumont. (Note: Cumont's ... argument was straightforward and may be summarized succinctly: The name of the god of the cult, Mithras, is the Latin (and Greek) form of the name of an ancient Iranian god, Mithra; in addition, the Romans believed that their cult was connected with Persia (as the Romans called Iran); therefore we may assume that Roman Mithraism is nothing other than the Iranian cult of Mithra transplanted into the Roman Empire. — D. Ulansey (1991)) An early example of the Greek form of the name is in a 4th century BCE work by Xenophon, the Cyropaedia, which is a biography of the Persian king Cyrus the Great.

The exact form of a Latin or classical Greek word varies due to the grammatical process of inflection. There is archaeological evidence that in Latin worshippers wrote the nominative form of the god's name as "Mithras". Porphyry's Greek text De Abstinentia (Περὶ ἀποχῆς ἐμψύχων), has a reference to the now-lost histories of the Mithraic mysteries by Euboulus and Pallas, the wording of which suggests that these authors treated the name "Mithra" as an indeclinable foreign word. (Note: Quoting from Gordon: "The usual western nominative form of Mithras' name in the mysteries ended in -s, as we can see from the one authentic dedication in the nominative, recut over a dedication to Sarapis (463, Terme de Caracalla), and from occasional grammatical errors such as deo inviato Metras (1443). But it is probable that Euboulus and Pallas, at least, used the name 'Mithra' as an indeclinable [foreign word] (ap. Porphyry, De abstinentia II.56 and IV.16).")

Related deity-names in other languages include:

- Vedic Sanskrit Mitra, "friend, friendship", as the name of a god praised in the Rigveda. (Note: India's sacred literature refers to him since the hymns of the Rig Veda. But it was in Iran where Mithras rose to the greatest prominence: Rebounding after the reforms of Zarathustra, Mithras became one of the great gods of the Achaemenian emperors and to this very day he is worshipped in India and Iran by Parsees and Zarathustrians.)

In Sanskrit, mitra is an unusual name of the sun god, mostly known as "Surya" or "Aditya", however.

- the form mi-it-ra-, found in an inscribed peace treaty between the Hittites and the kingdom of Mitanni, from about 1400 BCE. (Note: The name Mithras comes from a root mei- (which implies the idea of exchange), accompanied by an instrumental suffix. It was therefore a means of exchange, the 'contract' which rules human relations and is the basis of social life. In Sanskrit, mitra means 'friend' or 'friendship', like mihr in Persian. In Zend, mithra means precisely the 'contract', which eventually became deified, following the same procedure as Venus, the 'charm' for the Romans. We find him invoked with Varuna in an agreement concluded circa) between the king of the Hittites, Subbiluliuma, and the king of Mitanni, Mativaza. ... It is the earliest evidence of Mithras in Asia Minor.

Iranian Mithra and Sanskrit Mitra are believed to come from the Indo-Iranian word mitrás, meaning "contract, agreement, covenant".

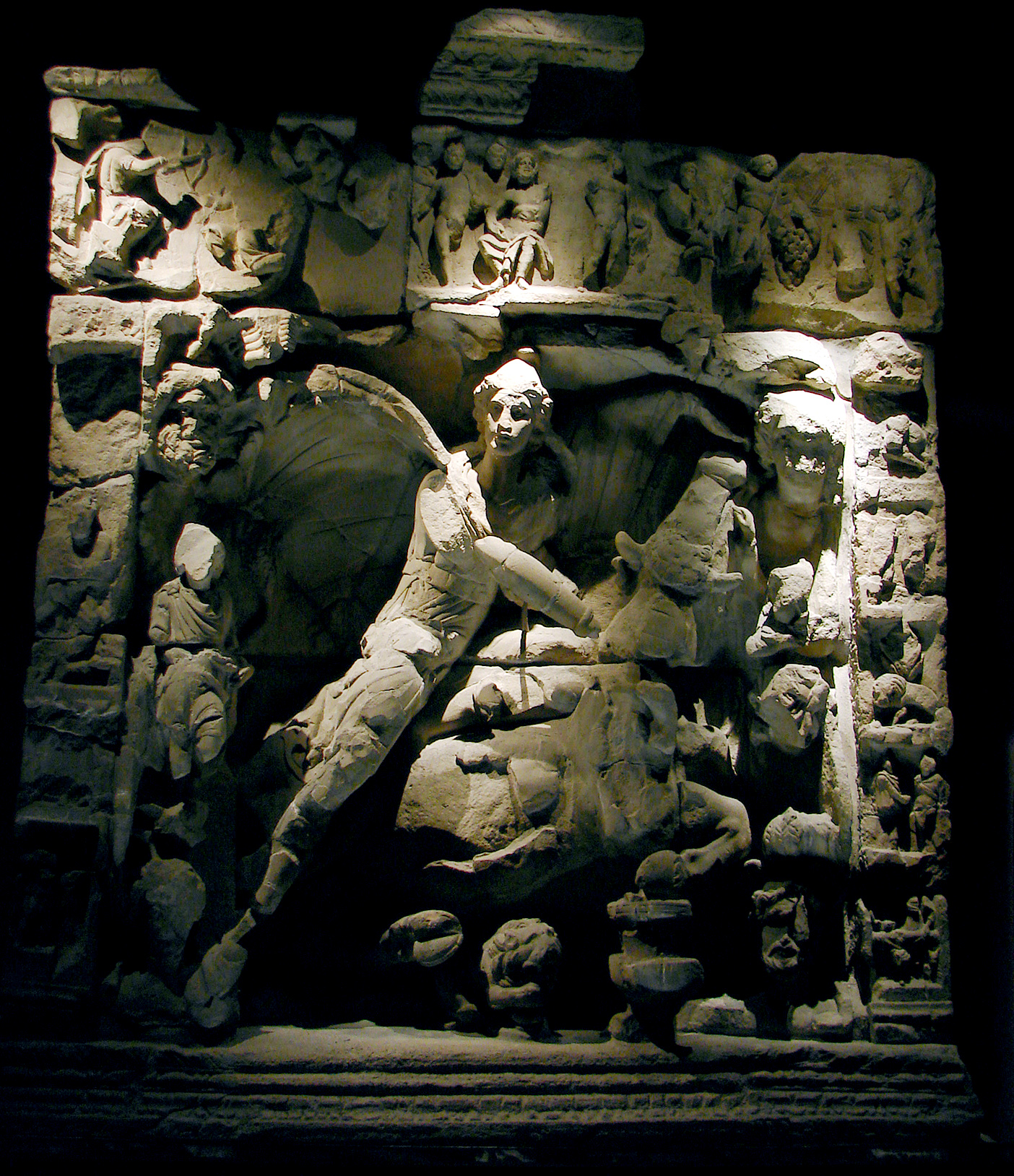
A bas-relief of the tauroctony of the mysteries, Metz, France

Modern historians have different conceptions about whether these names refer to the same god or not. John R. Hinnells has written of Mitra / Mithra / Mithras as a single deity, worshipped in several different religions. David Ulansey considers the bull-slaying Mithras to be a new god who began to be worshipped in the 1st century BCE, and to whom an old name was applied. (Note: ... the intimate alliance between the pirates and Mithridates Eupator, named after Mithra and mythically descended from Perseus, led to the pirates adopting the name Mithras for the new god. — D. Ulansey (1991))

Mary Boyce, an academic researcher on ancient Iranian religions, writes that even though Roman Mithraism seems to have had less Iranian content than ancient Romans or modern historians used to think, nonetheless "as the name Mithras alone shows, this content was of some importance". (Note: "The theory that the complex iconography of the characteristic monuments (of which the oldest belong to the second century A.C.) could be interpreted by direct reference to Iranian religion is now widely rejected; and recent studies have tended greatly to reduce what appears to be the actual Iranian content of this "self consciously 'Persian' religion", at least in the form which it attained under the Roman empire. Nevertheless, as the name Mithras alone shows, this content was of some importance; and the Persian affiliation of the Mysteries is acknowledged in the earliest literary reference to them.)

== Iconography ==
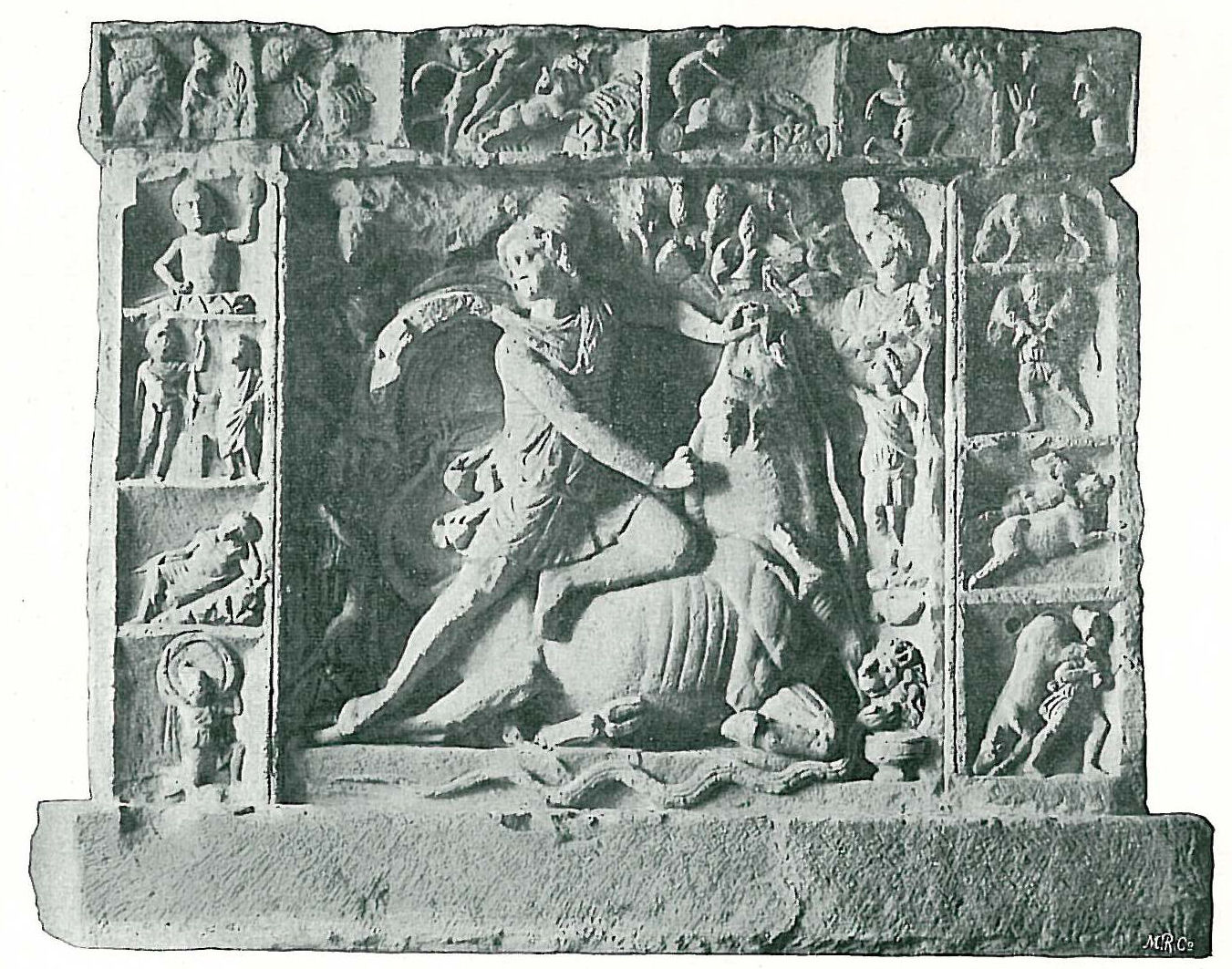
A relief of Mithras as bull-slayer from Neuenheim near Heidelberg, framed by scenes from Mithras' life

Much about the cult of Mithras is only known from reliefs and sculptures. There have been many attempts to interpret this material.

Mithras-worship in the Roman Empire was characterized by images of the god slaughtering a bull. Other images of Mithras are found in the Roman temples, for instance Mithras banqueting with Sol, and depictions of the birth of Mithras from a rock. But the image of bull-slaying (tauroctony) is always in the central niche. Textual sources for a reconstruction of the theology behind this iconography are very rare. (Note: ... we possess virtually no theological statements either by Mithraists themselves or by other writers. — Clauss (2000)) (See section Interpretations of the bull-slaying scene below.)

The practice of depicting the god slaying a bull seems to be specific to Roman Mithraism. According to David Ulansey, this is "perhaps the most important example" of evident difference between Iranian and Roman traditions: "... there is no evidence that the Iranian god Mithra ever had anything to do with killing a bull."

=== Bull-slaying scene ===
In every mithraeum the centerpiece was a representation of Mithras killing a sacred bull, an act called the tauroctony. (Note: English tauroctony is an adaption of the Greek word tauroktónos (ταυροκτόνος, "bull killing").) (Note: "Although the iconography of the cult varied a great deal from temple to temple, there is one element of the cult's iconography which was present in essentially the same form in every mithraeum and which, moreover, was clearly of the utmost importance to the cult's ideology; namely the so-called tauroctony, or bull-slaying scene, in which the god Mithras, accompanied by a series of other figures, is depicted in the act of killing the bull." — D. Ulansey (1991)) The image may be a relief, or free-standing, and side details may be present or omitted. The centre-piece is Mithras clothed in Anatolian costume and wearing a Phrygian cap; who is kneeling on the exhausted bull, holding it by the nostrils with his left hand, and stabbing it with his right. As he does so, he looks over his shoulder towards the figure of Sol. A dog and a snake reach up towards the blood. A scorpion seizes the bull's genitals.

A raven is flying around or is sitting on the bull. One or three ears of wheat are seen coming out from the bull's tail, sometimes from the wound. The bull was often white. The god is sitting on the bull in an unnatural way with his right leg constraining the bull's hoof and the left leg is bent and resting on the bull's back or flank. (Note: "The god's right leg, appearing on the left as one faces the tauroctony, is nearly always straight as it pins the bull's hoof to the ground, while his left leg, which is usually resting on the back or flank of the bull, is bent at the knee with his foot often partially obscured beneath the folds of his tunic. Anyone familiar with the cult's iconography will immediately recognize this awkward and possibly unnatural posture as a typical or even essential aspect of the tauroctony. The remarkable consistency of this particular feature is underscored by comparison with the subtle variability of others ..." — Z. Mazur (c. 2011)) The two torch-bearers on either side are dressed like Mithras: Cautes with his torch pointing up, and Cautopates with his torch pointing down. Sometimes Cautes and Cautopates carry shepherds' crooks instead of torches.

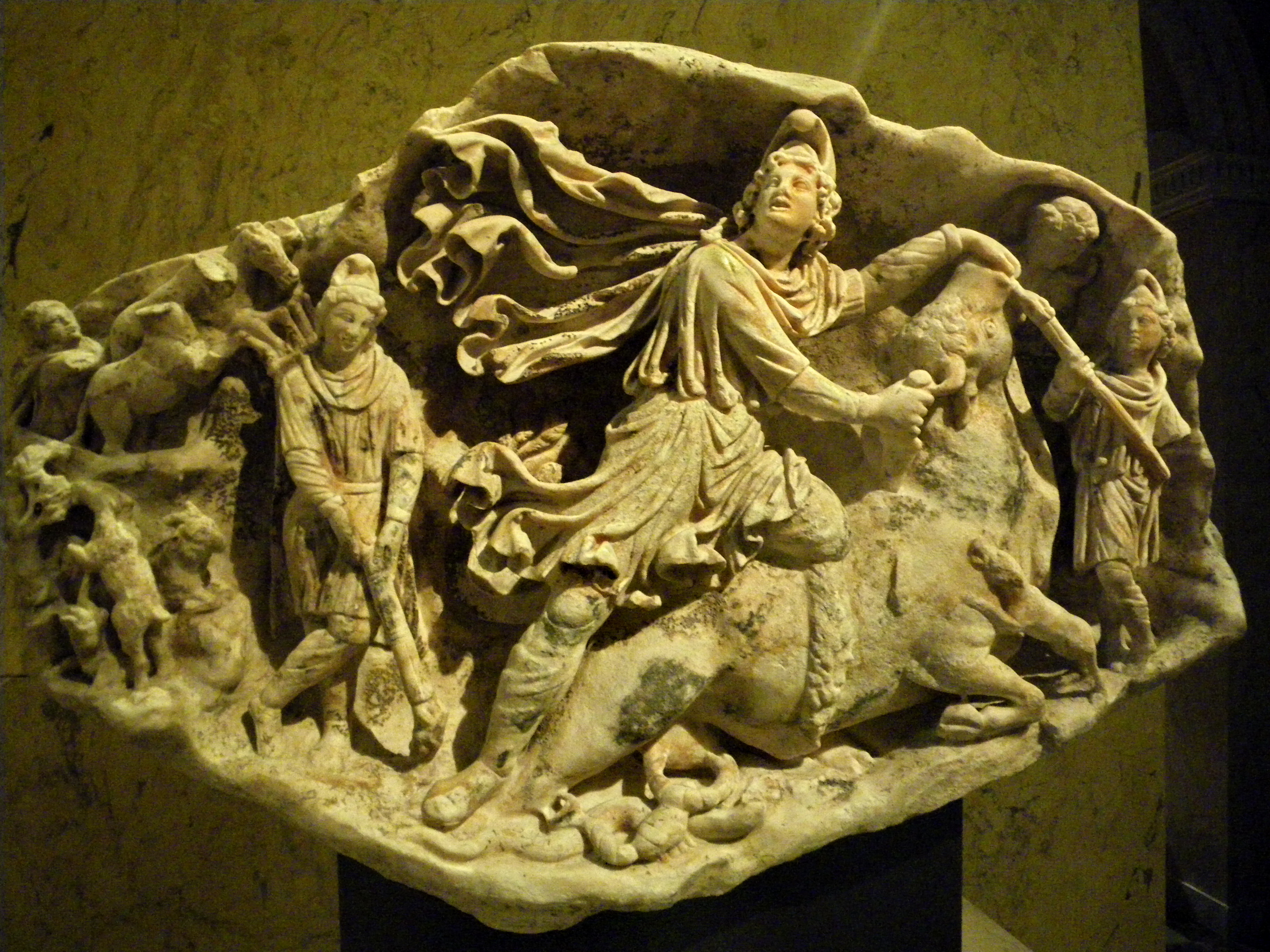
A Roman tauroctony relief from Aquileia (c. 175 CE; Kunsthistorisches Museum, Vienna)

The event takes place in a cavern, into which Mithras has carried the bull, after having hunted it, ridden it and overwhelmed its strength. Sometimes the cavern is surrounded by a circle, on which the twelve signs of the zodiac appear. Outside the cavern, top left, is Sol the sun, with his flaming crown, often driving a quadriga. A ray of light often reaches down to touch Mithras. At the top right is Luna, with her crescent moon, who may be depicted driving a biga.

In some depictions, the central tauroctony is framed by a series of subsidiary scenes to the left, top and right, illustrating events in the Mithras narrative; Mithras being born from the rock, the water miracle, the hunting and riding of the bull, meeting Sol who kneels to him, shaking hands with Sol and sharing a meal of bull-parts with him, and ascending to the heavens in a chariot. In some instances, as is the case in the stucco icon at Santa Prisca Mithraeum in Rome, the god is shown heroically nude. (Note: The figure of Mithras himself is usually attired in an oriental costume of Phrygian cap, tunica manicata (a long-sleeved tunic), anaxyrides (eastern style trousers), and a cape, though in some cases, he is depicted heroically nude or even, in a unique example from Ostia, in what seems to be a Greek chiton. Like the general trend in Graeco-Roman art, most if not all tauroctony scenes, regardless of the medium they were executed in, were painted, and the different items of Mithras' clothing was usually colored in either blue or red, often, as in the painting at Marino, with most of the costume in red with only the inside of the cape being blue and star-speckled. The bull was often white, sometimes wearing the dorsuale, the Roman sacrificial band in reds or browns, while the torchbearers could be depicted in a variety of colors with reds and greens being the most common. — Bjørnebye (2007).)

Some of these reliefs were constructed so that they could be turned on an axis. On the reverse was another, more elaborate feasting scene. This indicates that the bull killing scene was used in the first part of the celebration, then the relief was turned, and the second scene was used in the second part of the celebration. Besides the main cult icon, a number of mithraea had several secondary tauroctonies, and some small portable versions, probably meant for private devotion, have also been found.

=== Banquet ===
The second most important scene after the tauroctony in Mithraic art is the so-called banquet scene. The banquet scene features Mithras and Sol Invictus banqueting on the hide of the slaughtered bull. On the specific banquet scene on the Fiano Romano relief, one of the torchbearers points a caduceus towards the base of an altar, where flames appear to spring up. Robert Turcan has argued that since the caduceus is an attribute of Mercury, and in mythology Mercury is depicted as a psychopomp, the eliciting of flames in this scene is referring to the dispatch of human souls and expressing the Mithraic doctrine on this matter. Turcan also connects this event to the tauroctony: The blood of the slain bull has soaked the ground at the base of the altar, and from the blood the souls are elicited in flames by the caduceus.

=== Birth from a rock ===
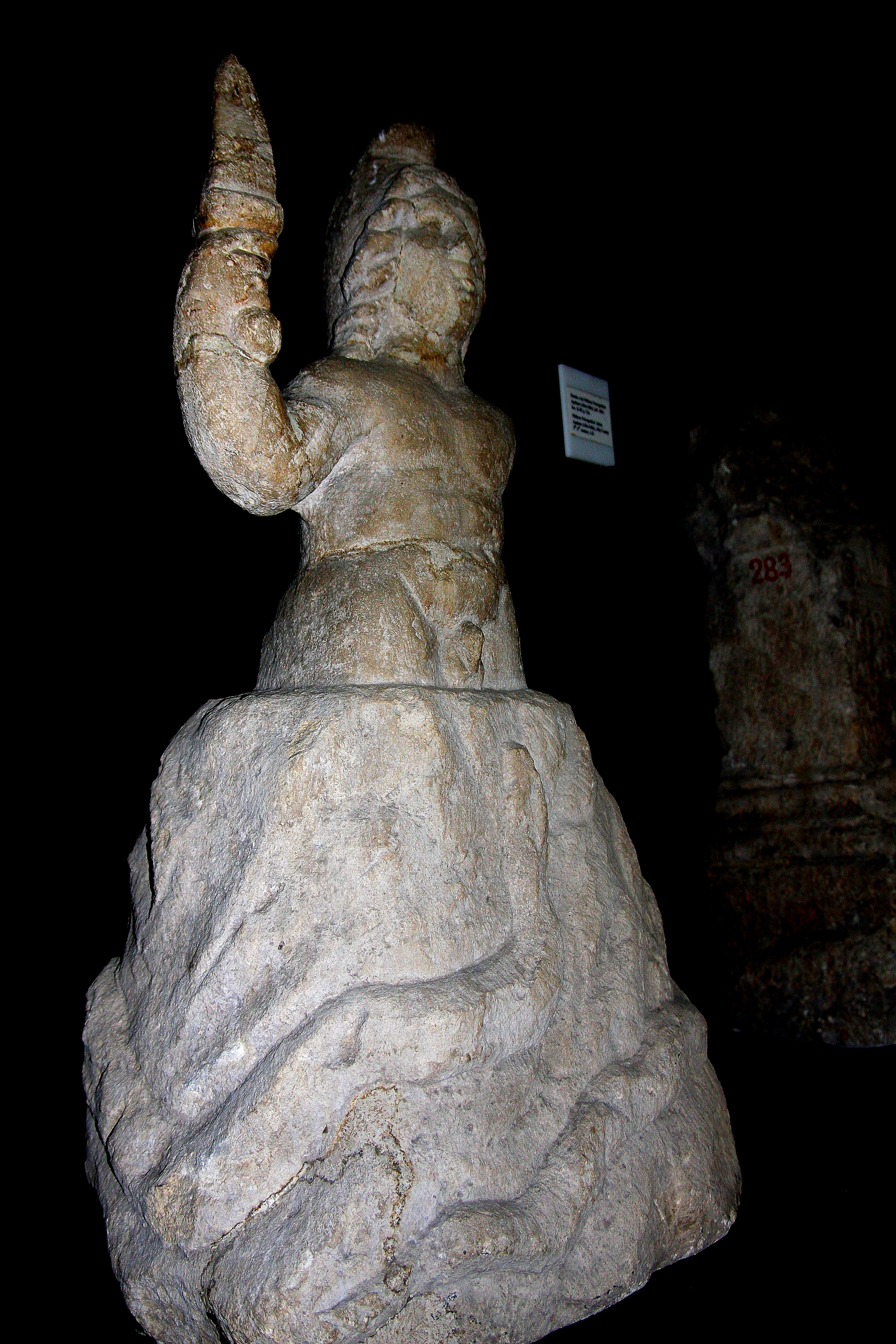
Mithras rising from the rock, National Museum of Romanian History

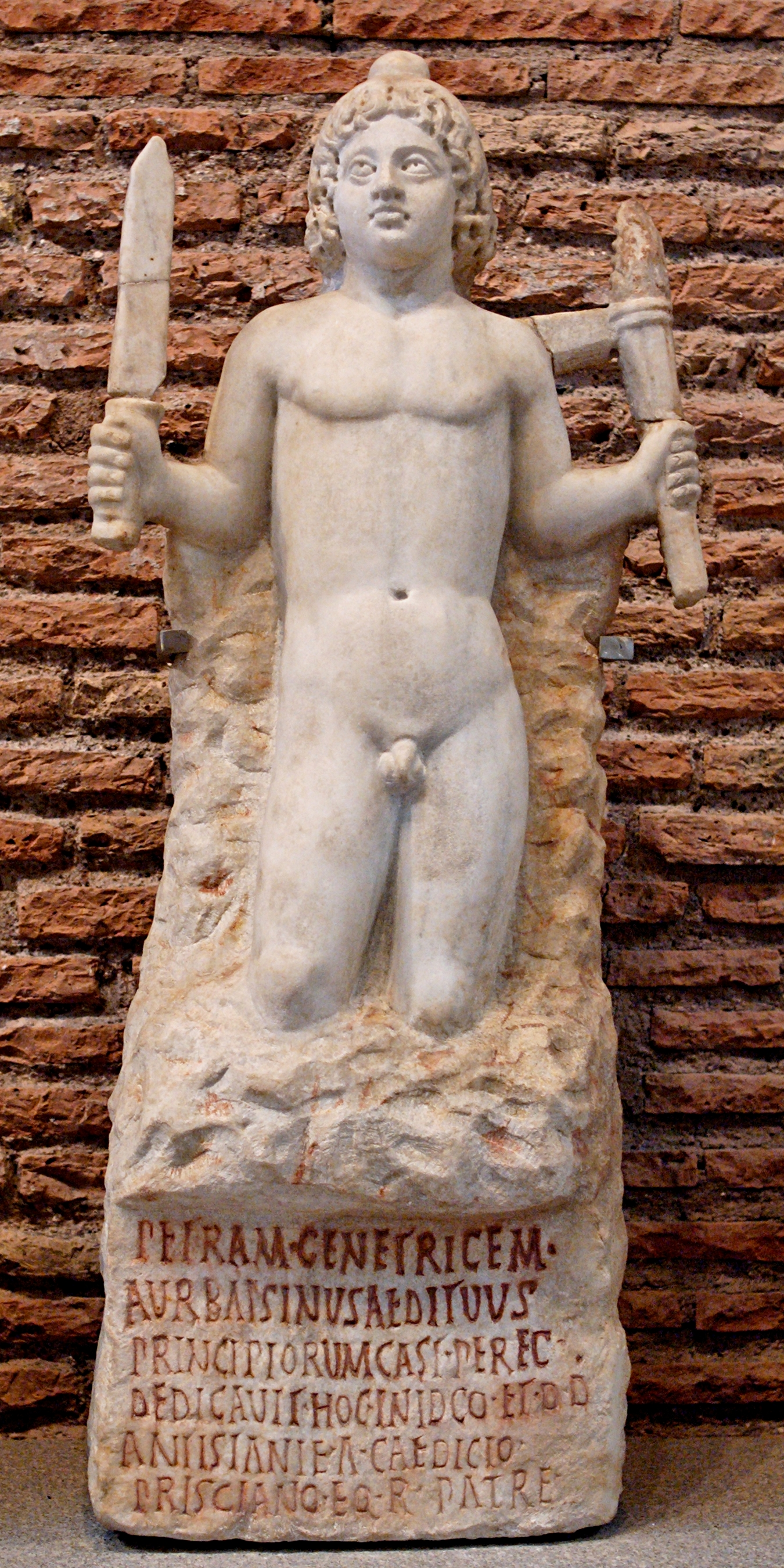
Mithras born from the rock, c. 186 CE, Baths of Diocletian

Mithras is depicted as being born from a rock. He is often shown as emerging from a rock, already in his youth, with a dagger in one hand and a torch in the other. He is nude, standing with his legs together, and is wearing a Phrygian cap.

In some variations, he is shown coming out of the rock as a child, and in one holds a globe in one hand; sometimes a thunderbolt is seen. There are depictions in which flames are shooting from the rock and from Mithras' cap. One statue had its base perforated so that it could serve as a fountain, and the base of another has the mask of a water god. Sometimes Mithras also has other weapons such as bows and arrows, and there are animals such as dogs, serpents, dolphins, eagles, other birds, lions, crocodiles, lobsters and snails around.

On some reliefs, there is a bearded figure identified as the water god Oceanus. On some there are the gods of the four winds. In these reliefs, the four elements could be invoked together. Sometimes Victoria, Luna, Sol, and Saturn also seem to play a role. Saturn in particular is often seen handing over the dagger or short sword to Mithras, used later in the tauroctony.

In some depictions, Cautes and Cautopates are also present; sometimes they are depicted as shepherds.

On some occasions, an amphora is seen, and a few instances show variations like an egg birth or a tree birth. Some interpretations show that the birth of Mithras was celebrated by lighting torches or candles.

=== Lion-headed figure ===
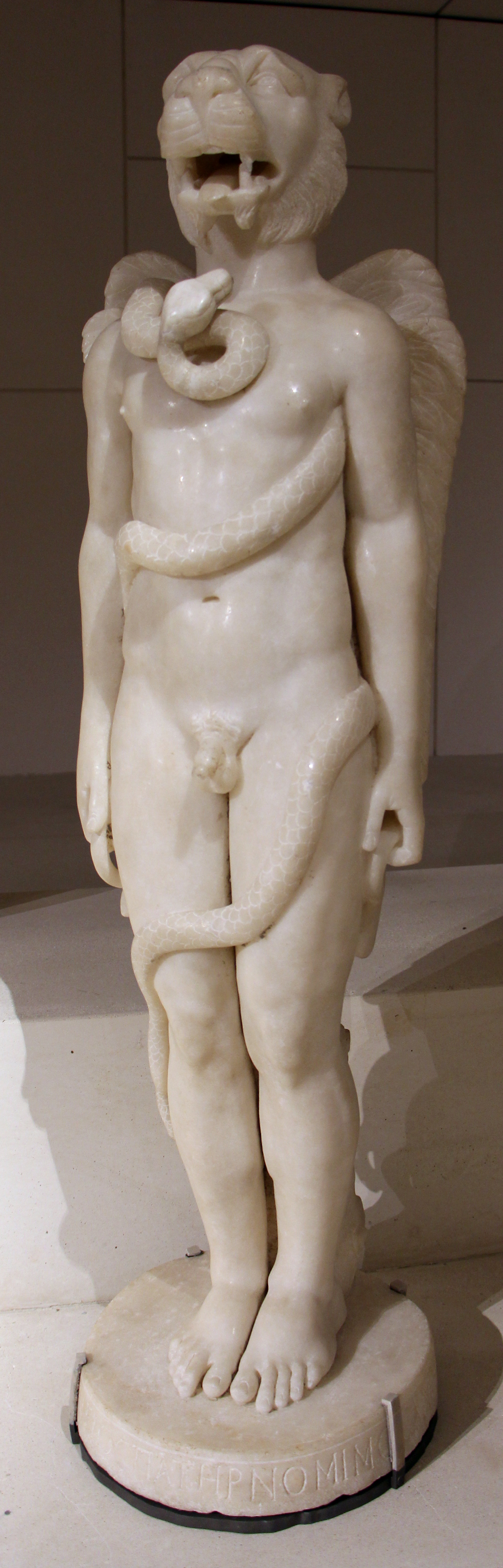
A lion-headed figure from the Sidon Mithraeum (500 CE; CIMRM 78 & 79; Louvre)

One of the most characteristic and poorly-understood features of the Mysteries is the naked lion-headed figure often found in Mithraic temples, named by the modern scholars with descriptive terms such as leontocephaline (lion-headed) or leontocephalus (lion-head). Although animal-headed figures are prevalent in contemporary Egyptian and Gnostic mythological representations, no exact parallel to the Mithraic leontocephaline figure has been found.

His body is a naked man's, entwined by a serpent (or two serpents, like a caduceus), with the snake's head often resting on the lion's head. The lion's mouth is often open. He is usually represented as having four wings, two keys (sometimes a single key), and a sceptre in his hand. Sometimes the figure is standing on a globe inscribed with a diagonal cross. On the figure from the Ostia Antica Mithraeum (left, CIMRM 312), the four wings carry the symbols of the four seasons, and a thunderbolt is engraved on his chest. At the base of the statue are the hammer and tongs of Vulcan and Mercury's cock and wand (caduceus). A rare variation of the same figure is also found with a human head and a lion's head emerging from its chest.

Based on dedicatory inscriptions for altars, the name of the figure is conjectured to be Arimanius, a Latinized form of the name Ahriman (Note: Note, however, that no inscription naming Arimanius has been found engraved on a lion-headed figure. All of the dedications to the name Arimanius are inscribed on altars without figures.) – perplexingly, a demonic figure in the Zoroastrian pantheon. Arimanius is known from inscriptions to have been a god in the Mithraic cult as seen, for example, in images from the Corpus Inscriptionum et Monumentorum Religionis Mithriacae (CIMRM) such as CIMRM 222 from Ostia, CIMRM 369 from Rome, and CIMRM 1773 and 1775 from Pannonia.

Some scholars identify the lion-man as Aion, or Zurvan, or Cronus, or Chronos, while others assert that it is a version of the Zoroastrian Ahriman or the more benign Vedic Aryaman. (Note: According to some, the lion man is Aion (Zurvan, or Kronos); according to others, Ahriman.) Although the exact identity of the lion-headed figure is debated by scholars, it is largely agreed that the god is associated with time and seasonal change.

== Rituals and worship ==
According to M.J. Vermaseren and C.C. van Essen, the Mithraic New Year and the birthday of Mithras was on 25 December. (Note: One should bear in mind that the Mithraic New Year began on Natalis Invicti, the birthday of their invincible god, i.e., December 25th, when the new light ... appears from the vault of heaven. — Vermaseren & van Essen (1965)) (Note: "For a time, coins and other monuments continued to link Christian doctrines with the worship of the Sun, to which Constantine had been addicted previously. But even when this phase came to an end, Roman paganism continued to exert other, permanent influences, great and small. ... The ecclesiastical calendar retains numerous remnants of pre-Christian festivals — notably Christmas, which blends elements including both the feast of the Saturnalia and the birthday of Mithra.") Beck disagreed strongly. Clauss states: "The Mithraic Mysteries had no public ceremonies of its own. The festival of Natalis Invicti, held on 25 December, was a general festival of the Sun, and by no means specific to the Mysteries of Mithras."

=== Mithraic catechism ===
Mithraic initiates were required to swear an oath of secrecy and dedication. Apparently, some grade rituals involved the recital of a catechism, wherein the initiate was asked a series of questions pertaining to the initiation symbolism and had to reply with specific answers. An example of such a catechism, apparently pertaining to the Leo grade, was discovered in a fragmentary Egyptian papyrus (Papyrus Berolinensis 21196), and reads:

Verso [...] He will say: 'Where [...]?' '[...] is he at a loss there?' Say: '[...]' [...] Say: 'Night'. He will say: 'Where [...]?' [...] Say: 'All things [...]' '[...] are you called?' Say: 'Because of the summery [...]' [...] having become [...] he/it has the fiery ones '[...] did you receive?' Say: 'In a pit'. He will say: 'Where is your [...]?' '[...] [in the] Leonteion.' He will say: 'Will you gird [...]?' '[...] death'. He will say: 'Why, having girded yourself, [...]?' [...] this [has?] four tassels.	Recto Very sharp and [...] [...] much. He will say: '[...]?' '[...] of the hot and cold'. He will say: '[...]?' '[...] red [...] linen'. He will say: 'Why?' Say: [...] red border; the linen, however, [...] '[...] has been wrapped?' Say: 'The savior's [...]' He will say: 'Who is the father?' Say: 'The one who [begets] everything [...]' [He will say: 'How] did you become a Leo?' Say: 'By the [...] of the father [...]' Say: 'Drink and food'. He will say: '[...]?' [...] in the seven-[...]

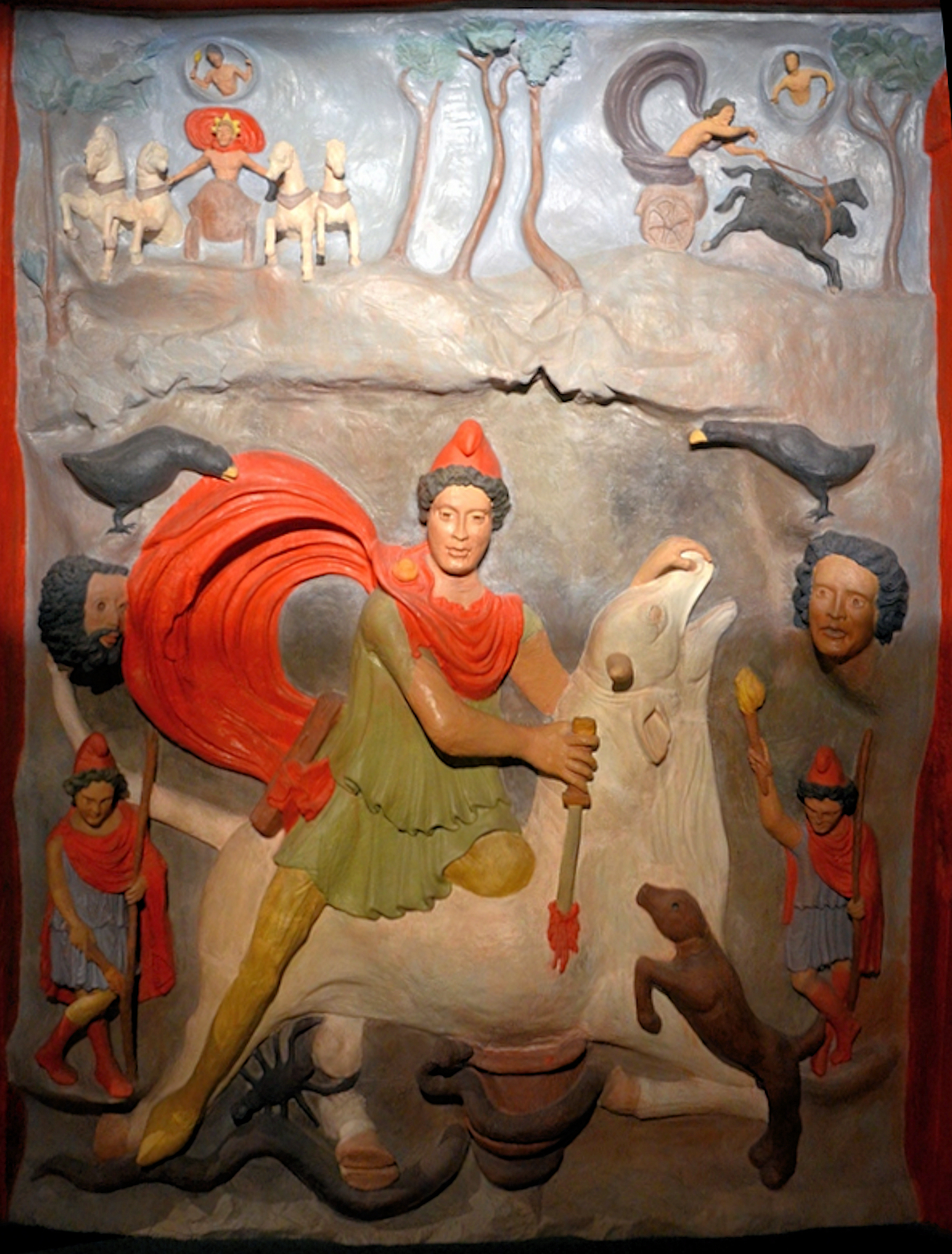
A Mithraic relief with original colors (reconstitution), c. 140–160 CE; from Argentoratum. Strasbourg Archaeological Museum.

Almost no Mithraic scripture or first-hand account of its rituals survives; with the exception of the aforementioned oath and catechism, and the document known as the Mithras Liturgy, from 4th century Egypt, whose status as a Mithraist text has been questioned by scholars including Franz Cumont. (Note: The original editor of the text, Albrecht Dieterich, claimed that it recorded an authentic Mithraic ritual, but this claim was rejected by Cumont, who felt that the references to Mithras in the text were merely the result of an extravagant syncretism evident in magical traditions. Until recently, most scholars followed Cumont in refusing to see any authentic Mithraic doctrine in the Mithras Liturgy. — D. Ulansey (1991)) The walls of mithraea were commonly whitewashed, and where this survives, it tends to carry extensive repositories of graffiti; and these, together with inscriptions on Mithraic monuments, form the main source for Mithraic texts.

=== Feasting ===
The archaeology of numerous mithraea indicates that most rituals were associated with feasting – as eating utensils and food residues are often found. These tend to include both animal bones and also very large quantities of fruit residues. The presence of large numbers of cherry-stones in particular would tend to confirm mid-summer (late June, early July) as a season especially associated with Mithraic festivities. The Virunum album, in the form of an inscribed bronze plaque, records a Mithraic festival of commemoration as taking place on 26 June 184. Beck argues that religious celebrations on this date are indicative of special significance being given to the summer solstice; but this time of the year coincides with ancient recognition of the solar maximum at midsummer, when iconographically identical holidays such as Fors Fortuna (ancient Rome), Saint John's Eve, and Jāņi (Latvia) are also observed.

For their feasts, Mithraic initiates reclined on stone benches arranged along the longer sides of the mithraeum – typically there might be room for 15 to 30 diners, but very rarely many more than 40 men. Counterpart dining rooms, or triclinia, were to be found above ground in the precincts of almost any temple or religious sanctuary in the Roman empire, and such rooms were commonly used for their regular feasts by Roman 'clubs', or collegia. Mithraic feasts probably performed a very similar function for Mithraists as the collegia did for those entitled to join them. Since qualification for Roman collegia tended to be restricted to particular families, localities or traditional trades, Mithraism may have functioned in part as providing clubs for the unclubbed. The size of the mithraeum is not necessarily an indication of the size of the congregation.

=== Altars, iconography, and suspected doctrinal diversity ===
Each mithraeum had several altars at the further end, underneath the representation of the tauroctony, and also commonly contained considerable numbers of subsidiary altars, both in the main mithraeum chamber and in the ante-chamber or narthex. These altars, which are of the standard Roman pattern, each carry a named dedicatory inscription from a particular initiate, who dedicated the altar to Mithras "in fulfillment of his vow", in gratitude for favours received.

Burned residues of animal entrails are commonly found on the main altars, indicating regular sacrificial use, though mithraea do not commonly appear to have been provided with facilities for ritual slaughter of sacrificial animals (a highly specialised function in Roman religion), and it may be presumed that a mithraeum would have made arrangements for this service to be provided for them in co-operation with the professional victimarius of the civic cult. Prayers were addressed to the Sun three times a day, and Sunday was especially sacred.

It is doubtful whether Mithraism had a monolithic and internally consistent doctrine. (Note: "Nevertheless, the fact that Porphyry and / or his sources would have had no scruples about adapting or even inventing Mithraic data to suit their arguments does not necessarily mean that they actually did so. It is far more likely that Mithraic doctrine (in the weak sense of the term!) really was what the philosophers said it was ... there are no insuperable discrepancies between Mithraic practice and theory as attested in Porphyry and Mithraic practice and theory as archaeology has allowed us to recover them. Even if there were major discrepancies, they would matter only in the context of the old model of an internally consistent and monolithic Mithraic doctrine.) It may have varied from location to location. The iconography is relatively coherent. It had no predominant sanctuary or cultic centre; and, although each mithraeum had its own officers and functionaries, there was no central supervisory authority. In some mithraea, such as that at Dura Europos, wall paintings depict prophets carrying scrolls, but no named Mithraic sages are known, nor does any reference give the title of any Mithraic scripture or teaching. It is known that initiates could transfer with their grades from one Mithraeum to another.

=== Mithraeum ===
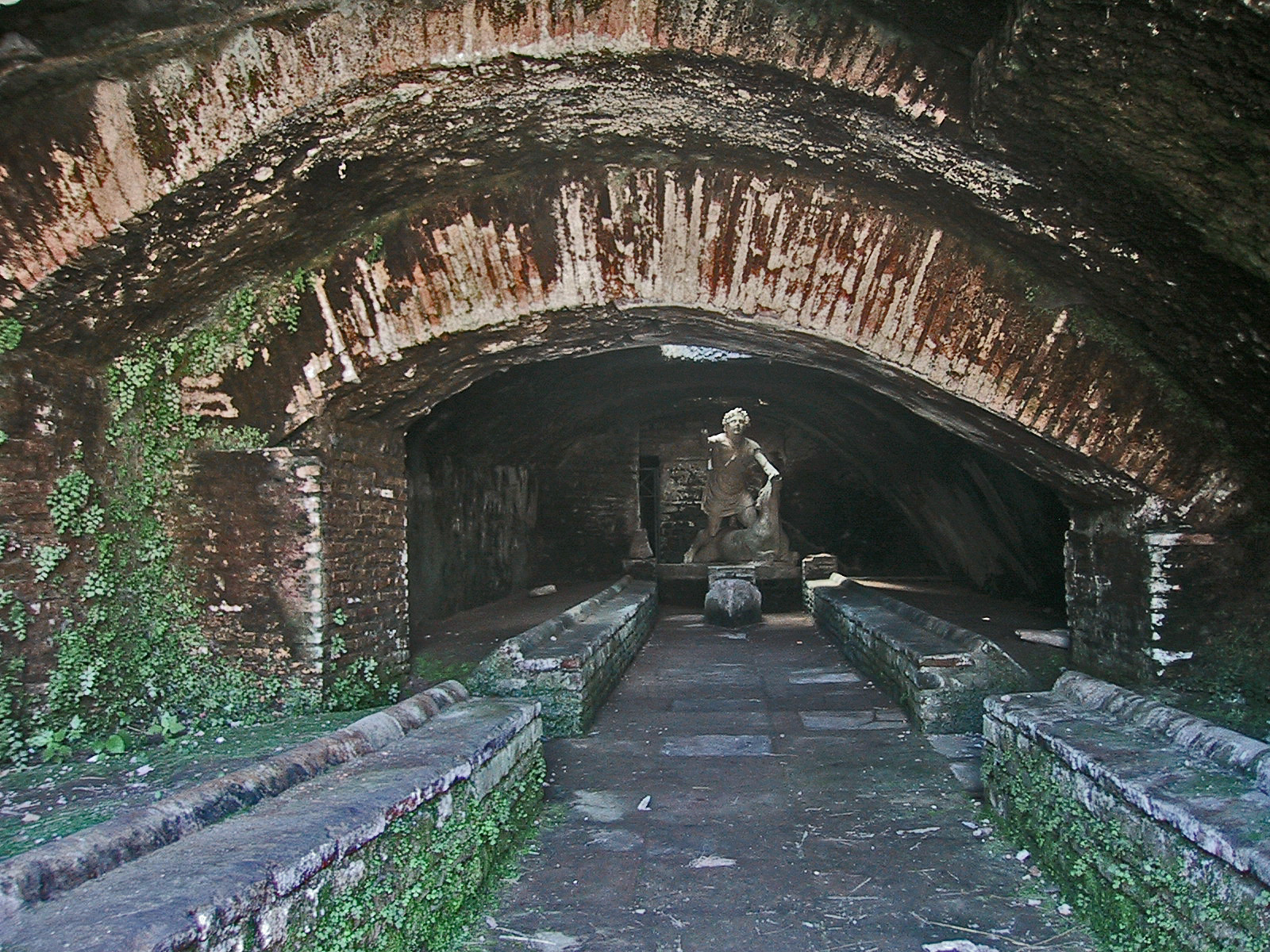
A mithraeum found in the ruins of Ostia Antica, Italy

Temples of Mithras are sunk below ground, windowless, and very distinctive. In cities, the basement of an apartment block might be converted; elsewhere they might be excavated and vaulted over, or converted from a natural cave. Mithraic temples are common in the empire; although unevenly distributed, with considerable numbers found in Rome, Ostia, Numidia, Dalmatia, Britain and along the Rhine/Danube frontier, while being somewhat less common in Greece, Egypt, and Syria. According to Walter Burkert, the secret character of Mithraic rituals meant that Mithraism could only be practiced within a Mithraeum. Some new finds at Tienen show evidence of large-scale feasting and suggest that the mystery religion may not have been as secretive as was generally believed. (Note: The discovery of a large quantity of tableware as well as animal remains in a pit outside the newly excavated mithraeum at Tienen, Belgium, has also attracted new attention to the topic of Mithraic processions and large-scale feasts, begging a re-examination of the secrecy of the cult and its visibility in local society ... provides evidence for large-scale, semi-public feasts outside of the mithraeum itself, suggesting that each mithraeum might have had a far larger following than its relative size would imply. — Bjørnebye (2007).)

For the most part, mithraea tend to be small, externally undistinguished, and cheaply constructed; the cult generally preferring to create a new centre rather than expand an existing one. The mithraeum represented the cave to which Mithras carried and then killed the bull; and where stone vaulting could not be afforded, the effect would be imitated with lath and plaster. They are commonly located close to springs or streams; fresh water appears to have been required for some Mithraic rituals, and a basin is often incorporated into the structure.

There is usually a narthex or ante-chamber at the entrance, and often other ancillary rooms for storage and the preparation of food. The extant mithraea present us with actual physical remains of the architectural structures of the sacred spaces of the Mithraic cult. Mithraeum is a modern coinage and mithraists referred to their sacred structures as speleum or antrum (cave), crypta (underground hallway or corridor), fanum (sacred or holy place), or even templum (a temple or a sacred space). (Note: The extant mithraea present us with actual physical remains of the architectural structures of the sacred spaces of the Mithraic cult. While the Mithraists themselves never used the word mithraeum as far as we know, but preferred words like speleum or antrum (cave), crypta (underground hallway or corridor), fanum (sacred or holy place), or even templum (a temple or a sacred space), the word mithraeum is the common appellation in Mithraic scholarship and is used throughout this study. — Bjørnebye (2007).)

In their basic form, mithraea were entirely different from the temples and shrines of other cults. In the standard pattern of Roman religious precincts, the temple building functioned as a house for the god, who was intended to be able to view, through the opened doors and columnar portico, sacrificial worship being offered on an altar set in an open courtyard – potentially accessible not only to initiates of the cult, but also to colitores or non-initiated worshippers. Mithraea were the antithesis of this.

=== Degrees of initiation ===
In the Suda under the entry Mithras, it states that "No one was permitted to be initiated into them (the mysteries of Mithras), until he should show himself holy and steadfast by undergoing several graduated tests." (Note: The Suda reference given is 3: 394, M 1045 (Adler).) Gregory Nazianzen refers to the "tests in the mysteries of Mithras". (Note: The Gregory reference given is to Oratio 4.70 .)

There were seven grades of initiation into Mithraism, which are listed by Jerome. Manfred Clauss states that the number of grades, seven, must be connected to the planets. A mosaic in the Mithraeum of Felicissimus, Ostia Antica depicts these grades, with symbolic emblems that are connected either to the grades or are symbols of the planets. The grades also have an inscription beside them commending each grade into the protection of the different planetary gods. In ascending order of importance, the initiatory grades were:

Grade	Name	Symbols	Planet or tutelary deity	Ostia Antica Felicissimus' mithraeum symbol mosaic
1^{st}	Corax, Corux, or Corvex (raven or crow)	Raven, beaker, caduceus	Mercury	
2^{nd}	Nymphus, Nymphobus (bridegroom)	Lamp, hand bell, veil, circlet or diadem	Venus	
3^{rd}	Miles (soldier)	Pouch, helmet, lance, drum, belt, breastplate	Mars	
4^{th}	Leo (lion)	Batillum, sistrum, laurel wreath, thunderbolt	Jupiter	
5^{th}	Perses (Persian)	Hooked sword, Phrygian cap, sickle, lunar crescent, stars, sling, pouch	Luna	
6^{th}	Heliodromus (sun-runner)	Torch, images of Helios, radiate crown, whip, robes	Sol	
7^{th}	Pater (father)	Patera, mitre, shepherd's staff, garnet or ruby ring, chasuble or cape, elaborate jewel-encrusted robes with metallic threads	Saturn	

Elsewhere, as at Dura-Europos, Mithraic graffiti survive giving membership lists, in which initiates of a mithraeum are named with their Mithraic grades. At Virunum, the membership list or album sacratorum was maintained as an inscribed plaque, updated year by year as new members were initiated. By cross-referencing these lists it is possible to track some initiates from one mithraeum to another; and also speculatively to identify Mithraic initiates with persons on other contemporary lists such as military service rolls and lists of devotees of non-Mithraic religious sanctuaries. Names of initiates are also found in the dedication inscriptions of altars and other cult objects.

Clauss noted in 1990 that overall, only about 14% of Mithraic names inscribed before 250 CE identify the initiate's grade – and hence questioned the traditional view that all initiates belonged to one of the seven grades. Clauss argues that the grades represented a distinct class of priests, sacerdotes. Gordon maintains the former theory of Merkelbach and others, especially noting such examples as Dura where all names are associated with a Mithraic grade. Some scholars maintain that practice may have differed over time, or from one Mithraeum to another.

The highest grade, pater, is by far the most common one found on dedications and inscriptions – and it would appear not to have been unusual for a mithraeum to have several men with this grade. The form pater patrum (father of fathers) is often found, which appears to indicate the pater with primary status. There are several examples of persons, commonly those of higher social status, joining a mithraeum with the status pater – especially in Rome during the 'pagan revival' of the 4th century. It has been suggested that some mithraea may have awarded honorary pater status to sympathetic dignitaries.

The initiate into each grade appears to have been required to undertake a specific ordeal or test, involving exposure to heat, cold or threatened peril. An 'ordeal pit', dating to the early 3rd century, has been identified in the mithraeum at Carrawburgh. Accounts of the cruelty of the emperor Commodus describes his amusing himself by enacting Mithraic initiation ordeals in homicidal form. By the later 3rd century, the enacted trials appear to have been abated in rigor, as 'ordeal pits' were floored over.

Admission into the community was completed with a handshake with the pater, just as Mithras and Sol shook hands. The initiates were thus referred to as syndexioi (those united by the handshake). The term is used in an inscription by Proficentius and derided by Firmicus Maternus in De errore profanarum religionum, (Note: ... "the followers of Mithras were the 'initiates of the theft of the bull, united by the handshake of the illustrious father'." (Err. prof. relig. 5.2)) a 4th century Christian work attacking paganism. In ancient Iran, taking the right hand was the traditional way of concluding a treaty or signifying some solemn understanding between two parties.

=== Ritual re-enactments ===
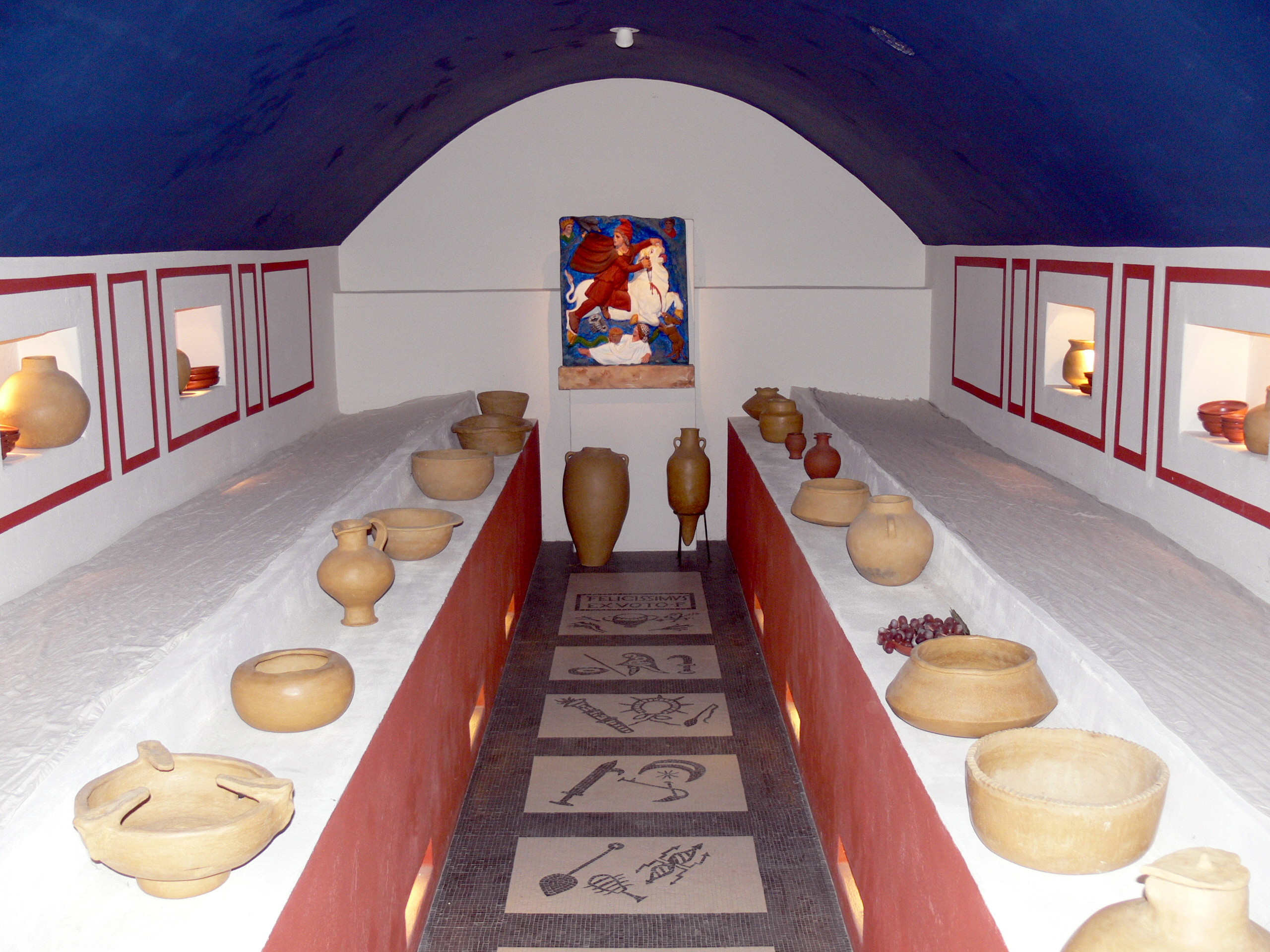
A reconstruction of a mithraeum with a mosaic depicting the grades of initiation

Activities of the most prominent deities in Mithraic scenes, Sol and Mithras, were imitated in rituals by the two most senior officers in the cult's hierarchy, the Pater and the Heliodromus. The initiates held a sacramental banquet, replicating the feast of Mithras and Sol.

Reliefs on a cup found in Mainz appear to depict a Mithraic initiation. On the cup, the initiate is depicted as being led into a location where a Pater would be seated in the guise of Mithras with a drawn bow. Accompanying the initiate is a mystagogue, who explains the symbolism and theology to the initiate. The Rite is thought to re-enact what has come to be called the 'Water Miracle', in which Mithras fires a bolt into a rock, and from the rock now spouts water.

Roger Beck has hypothesized a third processional Mithraic ritual, based on the Mainz cup and Porphyrys. This scene, called 'Procession of the Sun-Runner', shows the Heliodromus escorted by two figures representing Cautes and Cautopates (see below) and preceded by an initiate of the grade Miles leading a ritual enactment of the solar journey around the mithraeum, which was intended to represent the cosmos.

Consequently, it has been argued that most Mithraic rituals involved a re-enactment by the initiates of episodes in the Mithras narrative, a narrative whose main elements were: birth from the rock, striking water from stone with an arrow shot, the killing of the bull, Sol's submission to Mithras, Mithras and Sol feasting on the bull, the ascent of Mithras to heaven in a chariot. A noticeable feature of this narrative (and of its regular depiction in surviving sets of relief carvings) is the absence of female personages (the sole exception being Luna watching the tauroctony in the upper corner opposite Helios, and the presumable presence of Venus as patroness of the nymphus grade).

=== Membership ===
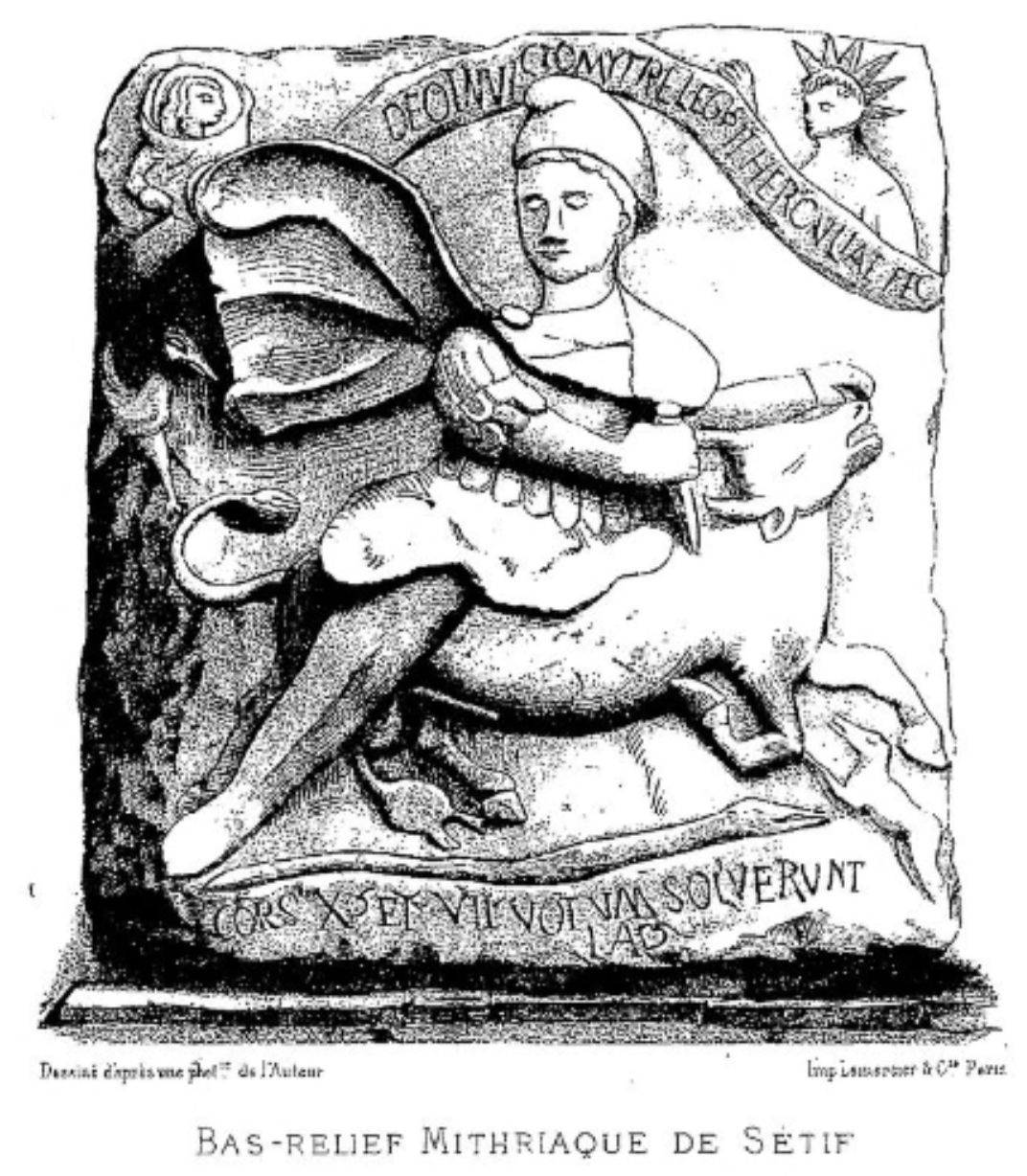
Another dedication to Mithras by legionaries of Legio II Herculia has been excavated at Sitifis (modern Setif in Algeria), so the unit or a subunit must have been transferred at least once.

Only male names appear in surviving inscribed membership lists. Historians including Richard Gordon have concluded the cult was for men only. (Note: Whilst the majority of the Oriental cults accorded to women a considerable role in their churches, and sometimes even a preponderating one, finding in them ardent supporters of the faith, Mithra forbade their participation in his Mysteries and so deprived himself of the incalculable assistance of these propagandists. The rude discipline of the order did not permit them to take the degrees in the sacred cohorts, and, as among the Mazdeans of the Orient, they occupied only a secondary place in the society of the faithful. Among the hundreds of inscriptions that have come down to us, not one mentions either a priestess, a woman initiate, or even a donatress.) (Note: ... Moreover, not a single woman is listed: The repeated attempts to show that women might belong to the cult are wishful thinking (Piccottini, 1994).)

The ancient scholar Porphyry refers to female initiates in Mithraic rites. (Note: Porphyry moreover seems to be the only writer who makes reference to women initiates into the service and rites of Mithra, and his allusion is perhaps due to a misunderstanding.... The participation of women in the ritual was not unknown in the Eastern cults, but the predominant military influence in Mithraism seems to render it unlikely in this instance.) The early 20th-century historian A.S. Geden wrote that this may be due to a misunderstanding. According to Geden, while the participation of women in the ritual was not unknown in the Eastern cults, the predominant military influence in Mithraism makes it unlikely in this instance. It has recently been suggested by David Jonathan that "Women were involved with Mithraic groups in at least some locations of the empire."

Soldiers were strongly represented amongst Mithraists, and also merchants, customs officials and minor bureaucrats. Few, if any, initiates came from leading aristocratic or senatorial families until the 'pagan revival' of the mid-4th century; but there were always considerable numbers of freedmen and slaves.

=== Ethics ===
Clauss suggests that a statement by Porphyry, that people initiated into the Lion grade must keep their hands pure from everything that brings pain and harm and is impure, means that moral demands were made upon members of congregations. (Note: "Justin's charge does at least make clear that Mithraic commandments did exist.")

A passage in the Caesares of Julian the Apostate refers to "commandments of Mithras". (Note: Hermes addresses Julian: "As for you ... I have granted you to know Mithras the Father. Keep his commandments, thus securing for yourself an anchor-cable and safe mooring all through your life, and, when you must leave the world, having every confidence that the god who guides you will be kindly disposed." — Clauss (2000). citing Caesares (336c in the translation of W.C. Wright).) Tertullian, in his treatise "On the Military Crown" records that Mithraists in the army were officially excused from wearing celebratory coronets on the basis of the Mithraic initiation ritual that included refusing a proffered crown, because "their only crown was Mithras".

== History and development ==
=== Mithras before the Roman Mysteries ===
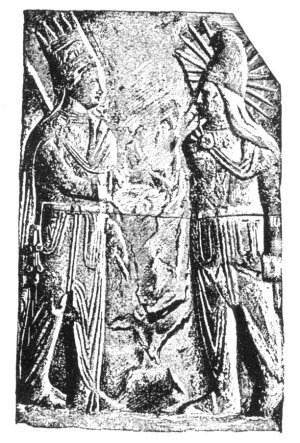
Mithras-Helios (right), with solar rays and in Iranian dress, with Antiochus I of Commagene (Mt. Nemrut, 1st century BCE)

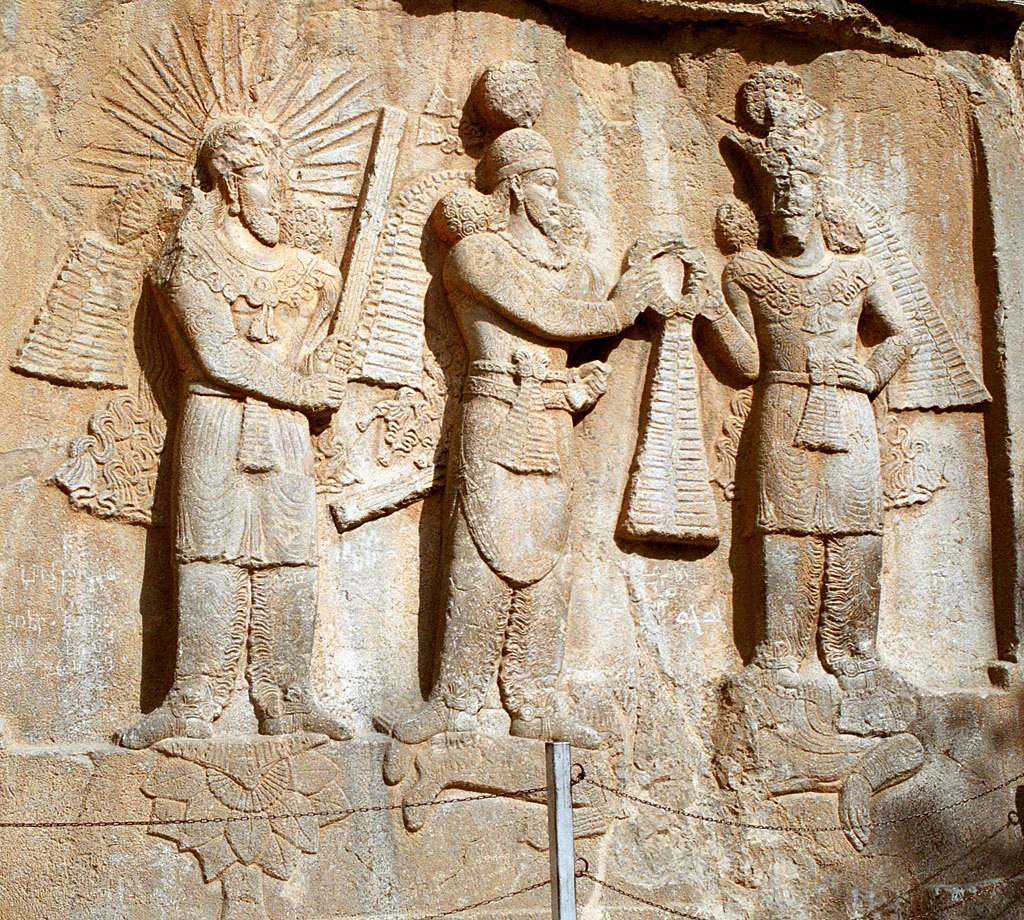
A 4th-century relief of the investiture of Sasanian king Ardashir II. Mithra stands on a lotus flower on the left holding a barsom.

According to the archaeologist Maarten Vermaseren, evidence from Commagene from the 1st century BCE demonstrates the "reverence paid to Mithras" but does not refer to "the mysteries". (Note: Other early evidence of the first decades BCE refers only to the reverence paid to Mithras without mentioning the mysteries: examples which may be quoted are the tomb inscriptions of King Antiochus I of Commagene at Nemrud Dagh, and of his father Mithridates at Arsameia on the Orontes. Both the kings had erected on vast terraces a number of colossal statues seated on thrones to the honour of their ancestral gods. At Nemrud we find in their midst King Antiochus (69–34 BCE) and in the inscription Mithras is mentioned ... — Vermaseren (1963)) In the colossal statuary erected by King Antiochus I (69–34 BCE) at Mount Nemrut, Mithras is shown beardless, wearing a Phrygian cap or the similar headdress – a Persian tiara, in Iranian (Parthian) clothing, and was originally seated on a throne alongside other deities and the king himself.

On the back of the thrones there is an inscription in Greek, which includes the compound name Apollo-Mithras-Helios in the genitive case (Ἀπόλλωνος Μίθρου Ἡλίου). Vermaseren also reports about a Mithras cult in Fayum in the 3rd century BCE. R.D. Barnett has argued that the royal seal of King Saussatar of the Mitanni from c. 1450 BCE depicts a tauroctonous Mithras. (Note: "I ... see these figures or some of them in the impression of the remarkable royal seal of King Saussatar of Mitanni (c. 1450 BCE great-great-grandfather of Kurtiwaza), the only royal Mitannian seal that we possess ... Mithra-tauroctonos, characteristically kneeling on the bull to despatch it. We can even see also the dog and snake ... below him are twin figures, one marked by a star, each fighting lions ... below a winged disc between lions and ravens, stands a winged, human-headed lion, ...")

=== Beginnings of Roman Mithraism ===
The origins and spread of the Mysteries have been intensely debated among scholars and there are radically differing views on these issues. According to Clauss, mysteries of Mithras were not practiced until the 1st century CE. According to Ulansey, the earliest evidence for the Mithraic mysteries places their appearance in the middle of the 1st century BCE: The historian Plutarch says that in 67 BCE the pirates of Cilicia (a province on the southeastern coast of Asia Minor, that provided sea access to adjacent Commagene) were practicing "secret rites" of Mithras. (Note: "Our earliest evidence for the Mithraic mysteries places their appearance in the middle of the 1st century BCE: The historian Plutarch says that in 67 BCE a large band of pirates based in Cilicia, a province on the southeastern coast of Asia Minor, were practicing "secret rites of Mithras". The earliest physical remains of the cult date from around the end of the 1st century CE, and Mithraism reached its height of popularity in the third century.")

According to C.M. Daniels, whether any of this relates to the origins of the mysteries is unclear. (Note: "Traditionally there are two geographical regions where Mithraism first struck root in the Roman empire: Italy and the Danube. Italy I propose to omit, as the subject needs considerable discussion, and the introduction of the cult there, as witnessed by its early dedicators, seems not to have been military. Before we turn to the Danube, however, there is one early event (rather than geographical location) which should perhaps be mentioned briefly in passing. This is the supposed arrival of the cult in Italy as a result of Pompey the Great's defeat of the Cilician pirates, who practised 'strange sacrifices of their own ... and celebrated certain secret rites, amongst which those of Mithra continue to the present time, having been first instituted by them'. Suffice it to say that there is neither archaeological nor allied evidence for the arrival of Mithraism in the West at that time, nor is there any ancient literary reference, either contemporary or later. If anything, Plutarch's mention carefully omits making the point that the cult was introduced into Italy at that time or by the pirates.") The unique underground temples or mithraea appear suddenly in the archaeology in the last quarter of the 1st century CE.

==== Earliest archaeology ====
Inscriptions and monuments related to the Mithraic Mysteries are catalogued in a two volume work by Maarten J. Vermaseren, the Corpus Inscriptionum et Monumentorum Religionis Mithriacae (or CIMRM). The earliest monument showing Mithras slaying the bull is thought to be CIMRM 593, found in Rome. There is no date, but the inscription tells us that it was dedicated by a certain Alcimus, steward of T. Claudius Livianus. Vermaseren and Gordon believe that this Livianus is a certain Livianus who was commander of the Praetorian guard in 101 CE, which would give an earliest date of 98–99 CE.

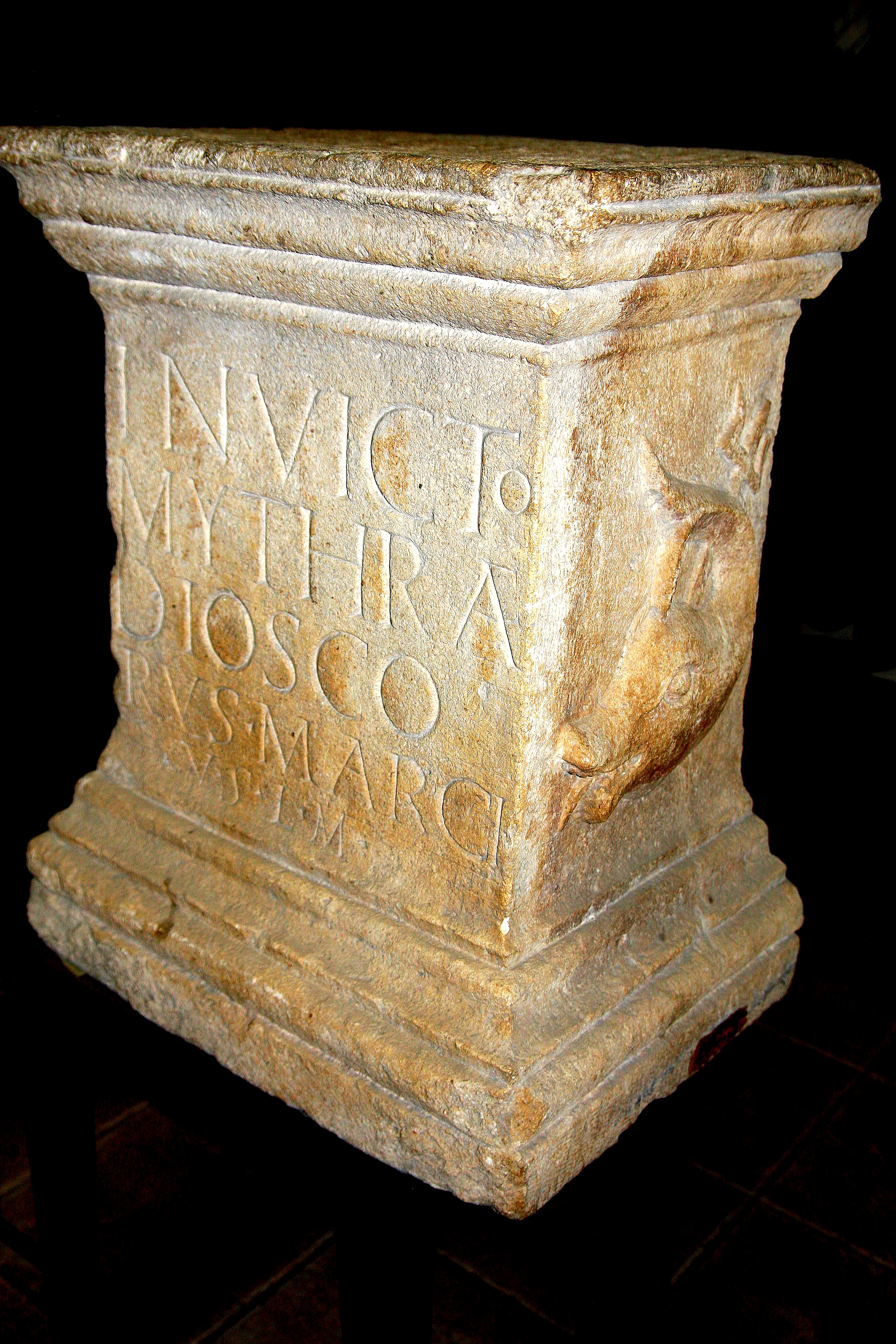
A votive altar from Alba Iulia in present-day Romania, dedicated to Invicto Mythrae in fulfillment of a vow (votum)

Five small terracotta plaques of a figure holding a knife over a bull have been excavated near Kerch in the Crimea, dated by Beskow and Clauss to the second half of the 1st century BCE, (Note: "Another possible piece of evidence is offered by five terracotta plaques with a tauroctone, found in Crimea and taken into the records of Mithraic monuments by Cumont and Vermaseren. If they are Mithraic, they are certainly the oldest known representations of Mithras tauroctone; the somewhat varying dates given by Russian archaeologists will set the beginning of the 1st century CE as a terminus ad quem, which is also said to have been confirmed by the stratigraphic conditions." Note 20 cites the book as Blawatsky & Kolchelenko (1966).) and by Beck to 50 BCE – 50 CE. These may be the earliest tauroctonies, if they are accepted to be a depiction of Mithras. (Note: ... the area [the Crimea] is of interest mainly because of the terracotta plaques from Kerch (five, of which two are in CIMRM as numbers 11 and 12): These show a bull-killing figure and their probable date (second half of 1st century BCE to first half of 1st century CE) would make them the earliest tauroctonies – if it is Mithras that they portray. Their iconography is significantly different from that of the standard tauroctony (e.g. in the Attis-like exposure of the god's genitals).)

The bull-slaying figure wears a Phrygian cap, but is described by Beck and Beskow as otherwise unlike standard depictions of the tauroctony. Another reason for not connecting these artifacts with the Mithraic Mysteries is that the first of these plaques was found in a woman's tomb. (Note: "The plaques are typical Bosporan terracottas ... At the same time it must be admitted that the plaques have some strange features which make it debatable if this is really Mithra(s). Most striking is the fact that his genitals are visible as they are in the iconography of Attis, which is accentuated by a high anaxyrides. Instead of the tunic and flowing cloak he wears a kind of jacket, buttoned over the breast with only one button, perhaps the attempt of a not so skillful artist to depict a cloak. The bull is small and has a hump and the tauroctone does not plunge his knife into the flank of the bull but holds it lifted. The nudity gives it the character of a fertility god and if we want to connect it directly with the Mithraic mysteries it is indeed embarrassing that the first one of these plaques was found in a woman's tomb." "He is grasping one of the bull's horns with his left hand, and wrenching back its head; the right arm is raised to deliver the death-blow. So far, this god must be Mithras. But in sharp contrast with the usual representations [of Mithras], he is dressed in a jacket-like garment, fastened at the chest with a brooch, which leaves his genitals exposed – the iconography typical of Attis.")

An altar or block from near SS. Pietro e Marcellino on the Esquiline in Rome was inscribed with a bilingual inscription by an Imperial freedman named T. Flavius Hyginus, probably between 80 and 100 CE. It is dedicated to Sol Invictus Mithras. (Note: CIMRM 362 a, b = el l, VI 732 = Moretti, lGUR I 179: Soli | Invicto Mithrae | T . Flavius Aug. lib. Hyginus | Ephebianus | d.d." but the Greek title is just "Helioi Mithrai" (ʽΗλιωι Μιθραι). The name "Flavius" for an imperial freedman dates it between 70–136 CE. The Greek section refers to a pater of the cult named Lollius Rufus, evidence of the existence of the rank system at this early date.)

CIMRM 2268 is a broken base or altar from Novae/Steklen in Moesia Inferior, dated 100 CE, showing Cautes and Cautopates.

Other early archaeology includes the Greek inscription from Venosia by Sagaris actor probably from 100–150 CE; the Sidon cippus dedicated by Theodotus priest of Mithras to Asclepius, 140–141 CE; and the earliest military inscription, by C. Sacidius Barbarus, centurion of XV Apollinaris, from the bank of the Danube at Carnuntum, probably before 114 CE.

According to C.M. Daniels, the Carnuntum inscription is the earliest Mithraic dedication from the Danube region, which along with Italy is one of the two regions where Mithraism first struck root. (Note: "The considerable movement [of civil servants and military] throughout the empire was of great importance to Mithraism, and even with the very fragmentary and inadequate evidence that we have it is clear that the movement of troops was a major factor in the spread of the cult. Traditionally there are two geographical regions where Mithraism first struck root: Italy and the Danube. Italy I propose to omit, as the subject needs considerable discussion, and the introduction of the cult there, as witnessed by its early dedicators, seems not to have been military. Before we turn to the Danube, however, there is one early event (rather than geographical location) which should perhaps be mentioned briefly in passing. This is the supposed arrival of the cult in Italy as a result of Pompey the Great's defeat of Cilician pirates, who practiced 'strange sacrifices of their own ... and celebrated certain secret rites, amongst which those of Mithras continue to the present time, have been first instituted by them'." (ref. Plutarch, Pompey 24–25) Suffice it to say that there is neither archaeological nor allied evidence for the arrival of Mithraism in the west at that time, nor is there any ancient literary reference, either contemporary or later. If anything, Plutarch's mention carefully omits making the point that the cult was introduced into Italy at that time or by the pirates. Turning to the Danube, the earliest dedication from that region is an altar to 'Mitrhe' [sic] set up by C. Sacidus Barbarus, a centurion of XV Appolinaris, stationed at the time at Carnuntum in Pannonia (Deutsches-Altenburg, Austria). The movements of this legion are particularly informative." The article then goes on to say that XV Appolinaris was originally based at Carnuntum, but between 62–71 CE transferred to the east, first in the Armenian campaign, and then to put down the Jewish uprising. Then 71–86 back in Carnuntum, then 86–105 intermittently in the Dacian wars, then 105–114 back in Carnuntum, and finally moved to Cappadocia in 114.) The earliest dateable mithraeum outside Rome dates from 148 CE. (Note: The first dateable Mithraeum outside Italy is from Böckingen on the Neckar, where a centurion of the legion VIII Augustus dedicated two altars, one to Mithras and the other (dated 148) to Apollo.) The Mithraeum at Caesarea Maritima is the only one in Palestine and the date is inferred. (Note: "At present this is the only Mithraeum known in Roman Palestine." "It is difficult to assign an exact date to the founding of the Caesarea Maritima Mithraeum. No dedicatory plaques have been discovered that might aid in the dating. The lamps found with the taurectone medallion are from the end of the first century to the late 3rd century CE. Other pottery and coins from the vault are also from this era. Therefore, it is speculated that this Mithraeum developed toward the end of the 1st century and remained active until the late 3rd century. This matches the dates assigned to the Dura-Europos and the Sidon Mithraea.")

Excavations at Inveresk, Scotland in 2010 found two well-preserved altars to Mithras dated to 140 CE. The altars are believed to be from the Roman Empire's most northerly temple to Mithras.

==== Earliest cult locations ====
According to Roger Beck, the attested locations of the Roman cult in the earliest phase (c. 80–120 CE) are as follows:

Mithraea datable from pottery

- Nida/Heddernheim III (Germania Sup.)
- Mogontiacum (Germania Sup.)
- Pons Aeni (Noricum)
- Caesarea Maritima (Judaea)

Datable dedications

- Nida/Heddernheim I (Germania Sup.) (CIMRM 1091, 1092, & 1098)
- Carnuntum III (Pannonia Sup.) (CIMRM 1718)
- Novae (Moesia Inf.) (CIMRM 2268 & 2269)
- Oescus (Moesia Inf.) (CIMRM 2250)
- Rome (CIMRM 362, 593, & 594)

=== Classical literature about Mithras and the Mysteries ===
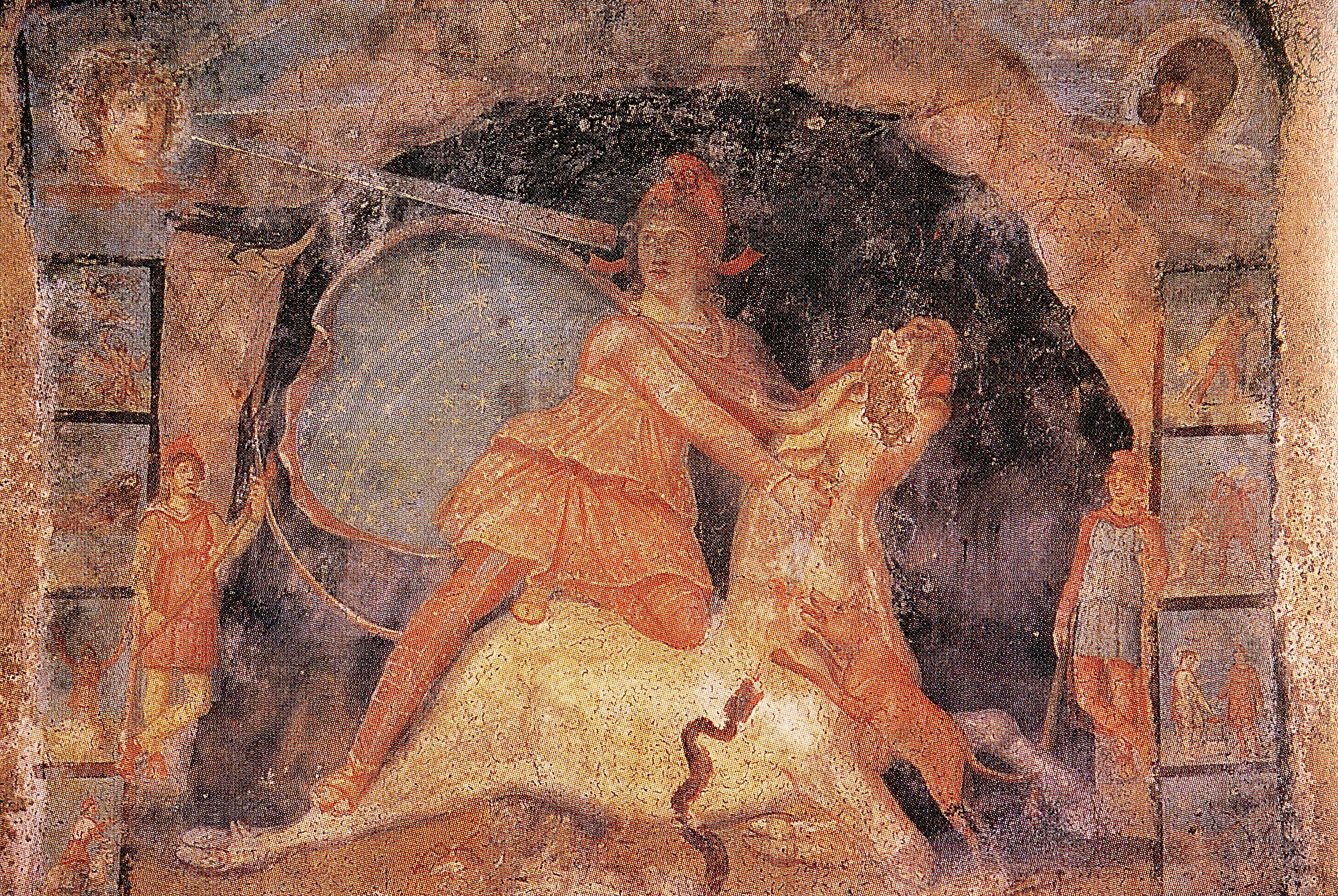
Mithras and the Bull: This fresco from the mithraeum at Marino, Italy, third century, shows the tauroctony and the celestial lining of Mithras' cape.

According to Boyce, the earliest literary references to the mysteries are by the Latin poet Statius, about 80 CE, and Plutarch (c. 100 CE). (Note: ... the Persian affiliation of the Mysteries is acknowledged in the earliest literary reference to them. This is by the Latin poet Statius: Writing about 80 CE, he described Mithras as one who "twists the unruly horns beneath the rocks of a Persian cave". Only a little later (c. 100 CE) Plutarch attributed an Anatolian origin to the mysteries, for according to him the Cilician pirates whom Pompey defeated in 67 BCE. "celebrated certain secret rites, amongst which those of Mithras continue to the present time, having been first instituted by them".)

==== Statius ====
The Thebaid (c. 80 CE) an epic poem by Statius, pictures Mithras in a cave, wrestling with something that has horns. The context is a prayer to the god Phoebus. The cave is described as persei, which in this context is usually translated Persian. According to the translator J.H. Mozley it literally means Persean, referring to Perses, the son of Perseus and Andromeda, this Perses being the ancestor of the Persians according to Greek legend.

==== Justin Martyr ====
Writing in approximately 145 CE, the early Christian apologist Justin Martyr charges the cult of Mithras with imitating the Christian communion,

Which the wicked devils have imitated in the mysteries of Mithras, commanding the same things to be done. For, that bread and a cup of water are placed, with certain incantations, in the mystic rites of one who is being initiated, you either know or can learn.

==== Plutarch ====
The Greek biographer Plutarch (46–127 CE) says that "secret mysteries ... of Mithras" were practiced by the pirates of Cilicia, the coastal province in the southeast of Anatolia, who were active in the 1st century BCE: "They likewise offered strange sacrifices; those of Olympus I mean; and they celebrated certain secret mysteries, among which those of Mithras continue to this day, being originally instituted by them." He mentions that the pirates were especially active during the Mithridatic wars (between the Roman Republic and King Mithridates VI of Pontus) in which they supported the king. The association between Mithridates and the pirates is also mentioned by the ancient historian Appian. (Note: Appian Mith 14.92 cited in) The 4th century commentary on Vergil by Servius says that Pompey settled some of these pirates in Calabria in southern Italy.

==== Dio Cassius ====
The historian Dio Cassius (2nd to 3rd century CE) tells how the name of Mithras was spoken during the state visit to Rome of Tiridates I of Armenia, during the reign of Nero. (Tiridates was the son of Vonones II of Parthia, and his coronation by Nero in 66 CE confirmed the end of a war between Parthia and Rome.) Dio Cassius writes that Tiridates, as he was about to receive his crown, told the Roman emperor that he revered him "as Mithras". Roger Beck thinks it possible that this episode contributed to the emergence of Mithraism as a popular religion in Rome. (Note: In the Cumontian scenario this episode cannot mark the definitive moment of transfer, for Mithraism in that scenario was already established in Rome, albeit on a scale too small to have left any trace in the historical or archaeological record. Nevertheless, it could have been a spur to Mithraism's emergence on to the larger stage of popular appeal.)

==== Porphyry ====
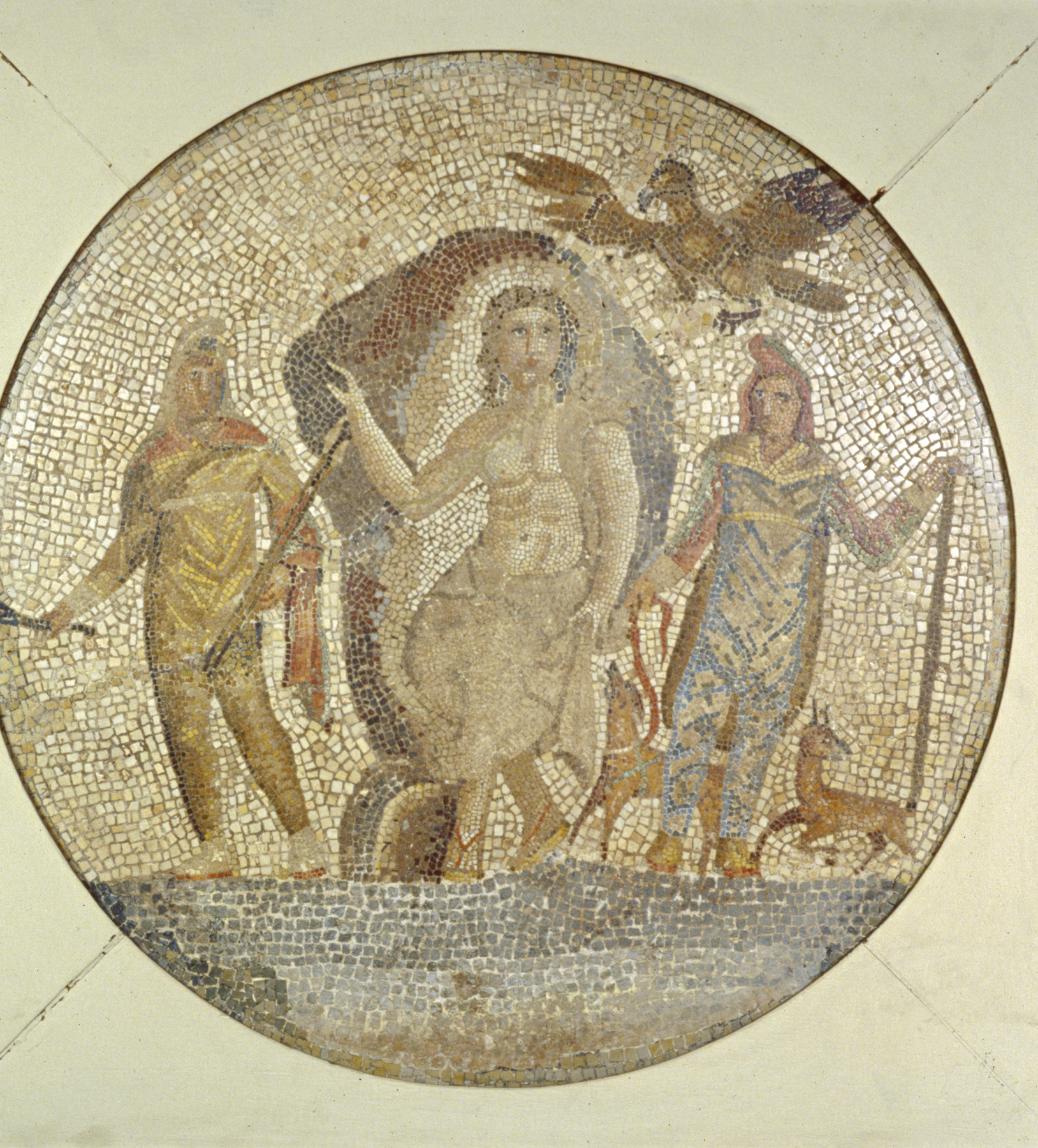
A 1st century CE mosaic depicting Mithras emerging from his cave and flanked by Cautes and Cautopates (Walters Art Museum)

The philosopher Porphyry (3rd–4th century CE) gives an account of the origins of the Mysteries in his work De antro nympharum (The Cave of the Nymphs). Citing Eubulus as his source, Porphyry writes that the original temple of Mithras was a natural cave, containing fountains, which Zoroaster found in the mountains of Persia. To Zoroaster, this cave was an image of the whole world, so he consecrated it to Mithras, the creator of the world. Later in the same work, Porphyry links Mithras and the bull with planets and star-signs: Mithras himself is associated with the sign of Aries and the planet Mars, while the bull is associated with Venus. (Note: "Hence, a place near to the equinoctial circle was assigned to Mithra as an appropriate seat. And on this account he bears the sword of Aries, which is a martial sign. He is likewise carried in the Bull, which is the sign of Venus. For Mithra. as well as the Bull, is the Demiurgus and lord of generation." — Porphyry)

Porphyry is writing close to the demise of the cult, and Robert Turcan has challenged the idea that Porphyry's statements about Mithraism are accurate. His case is that far from representing what Mithraists believed, they are merely representations by the Neoplatonists of what it suited them in the late 4th century to read into the mysteries. (Note: Turcan, Robert (1975). Mithras Platonicus. Leiden, NL. cited by Beck (1987)) Merkelbach & Beck believed Porphyry's work "is in fact thoroughly coloured with the doctrines of the Mysteries". Beck holds that classical scholars have neglected Porphyry's evidence and have taken an unnecessarily skeptical view of Porphyry. According to Beck, Porphyry's De antro is the only clear text from antiquity which tells us about the intent of the Mithraic mysteries and how that intent was realized. (Note: [Porphyry's] De antro 6 is actually the sole explicit testimony from antiquity as to the intent of Mithraism's mysteries and the means by which that intent was realized. Porphyry, moreover, was an intelligent and well-placed theoretician of contemporary religion, with access to predecessors' studies, now lost.) David Ulansey finds it important that Porphyry "confirms ... that astral conceptions played an important role in Mithraism."

==== Mithras Liturgy ====
In later antiquity, the Greek name of Mithras (Μίθρας) occurs in the text known as the "Mithras Liturgy", a part of the Paris Greek Magical Papyrus here Mithras is given the epithet "the great god", and is identified with the sun god Helios. (Note: The reference is at line 482 of the Great Magical Papyrus of Paris. The entire Mithras Liturgy comprises lines 475–834 of the papyrus.) There have been different views among scholars as to whether this text is an expression of Mithraism as such. Franz Cumont argued that it is not; Marvin Meyer thinks it is; while Hans Dieter Betz sees it as a synthesis of Greek, Egyptian, and Mithraic traditions.

=== Modern debate on origin ===
==== Cumont's hypothesis: from Persian state religion ====
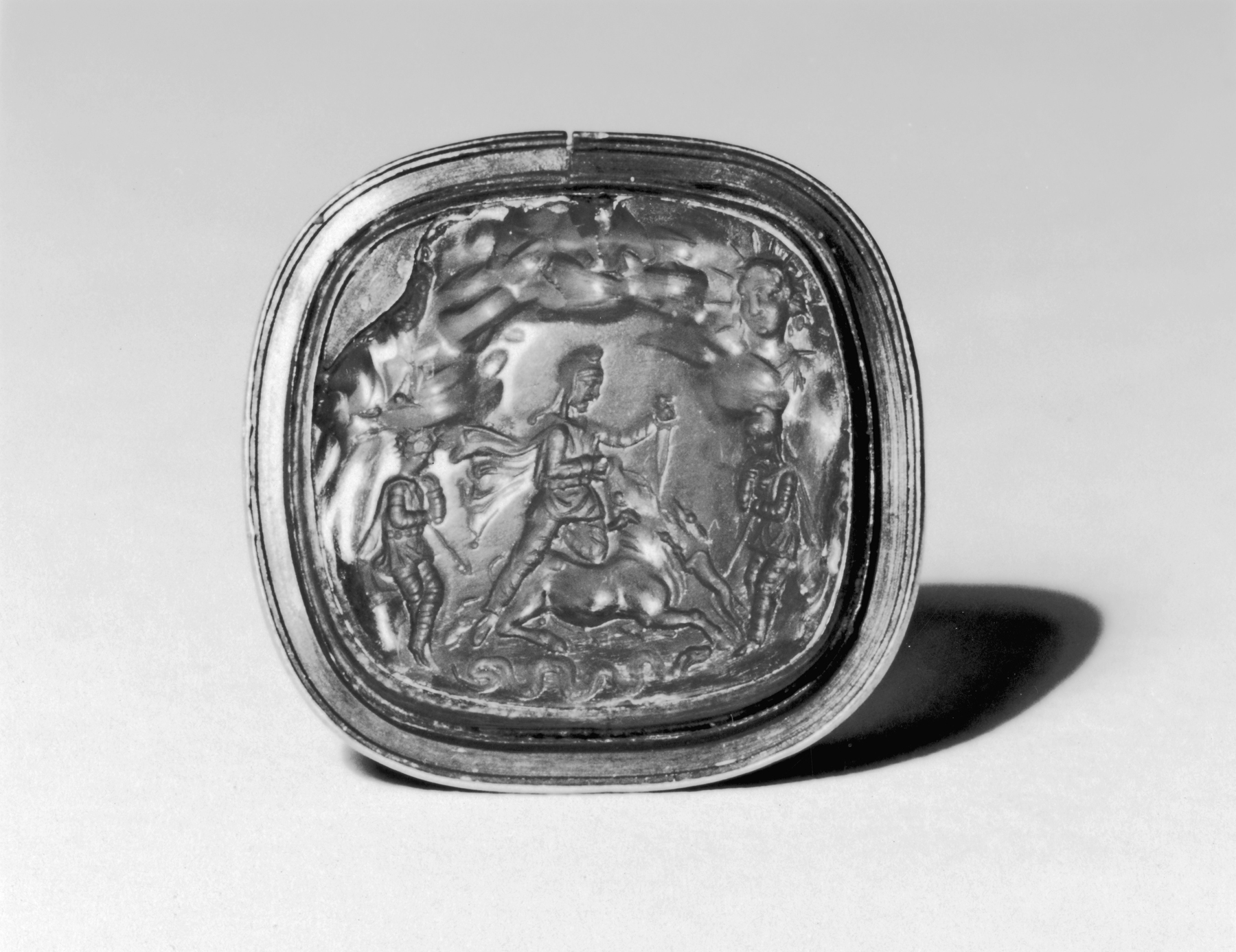
An Augustan-era intaglio depicting a tauroctony (Walters Art Museum)

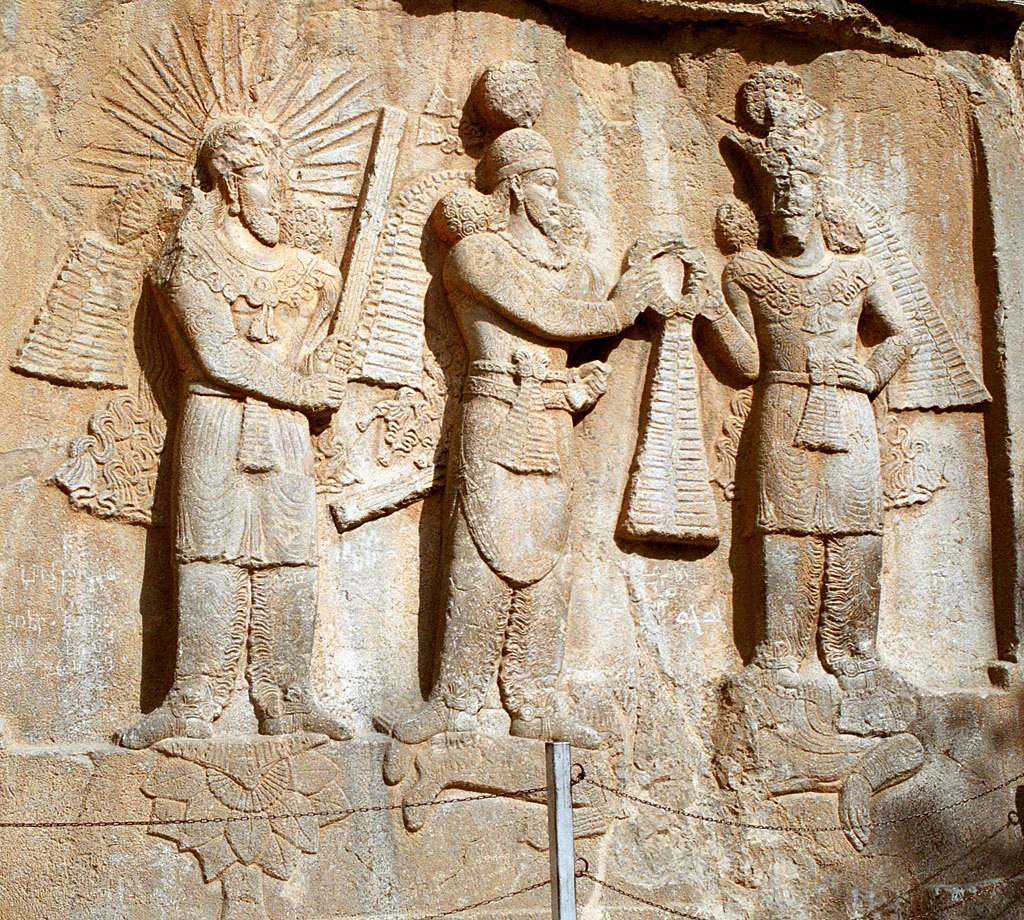
A 4th-century relief of the investiture of the Sasanian king Ardashir II. Mithra stands on a lotus flower on the left holding a barsom.

Scholarship on Mithras begins with Franz Cumont, who published a two volume collection of source texts and images of monuments in French in 1894–1900, Textes et monuments figurés relatifs aux mystères de Mithra [French: Texts and Illustrated Monuments Relating to the Mysteries of Mithra]. An English translation of part of this work was published in 1903, with the title The Mysteries of Mithra.

Cumont's hypothesis, as the author summarizes it in the first 32 pages of his book, was that the Roman religion was "the Roman form of Mazdaism", the Persian state religion, disseminated from the East. He identified the ancient Aryan deity who appears in Persian literature as Mithras with the Hindu god Mitra of the Vedic hymns.

According to Cumont, the god Mithra came to Rome "accompanied by a large representation of the Mazdean Pantheon." Cumont considers that while the tradition "underwent some modification in the Occident ... the alterations that it suffered were largely superficial."

==== Criticisms and reassessments of Cumont ====
Cumont's theories came in for severe criticism from John R. Hinnells and R.L. Gordon at the First International Congress of Mithraic Studies held in 1971. (Note: In the course of the First International Congress, two scholars in particular presented devastating critiques of Cumont's Iranian hypothesis ... One, John Hinnells, was the organizer of the conference ... Of more importance in the long run, however, was the even more radical paper presented by R.L. Gordon ... — Ulansey (1991)) John Hinnells was unwilling to reject entirely the idea of Iranian origin, but wrote: "we must now conclude that his reconstruction simply will not stand. It receives no support from the Iranian material and is in fact in conflict with the ideas of that tradition as they are represented in the extant texts. Above all, it is a theoretical reconstruction which does not accord with the actual Roman iconography." (Note: "Since Cumont's reconstruction of the theology underlying the reliefs in terms of the Zoroastrian myth of creation depends upon the symbolic expression of the conflict of good and evil, we must now conclude that his reconstruction simply will not stand. It receives no support from the Iranian material and is in fact in conflict with the ideas of that tradition as they are represented in the extant texts. Above all, it is a theoretical reconstruction which does not accord with the actual Roman iconography. What, then, do the reliefs depict? And how can we proceed in any study of Mithraism? I would accept with R. Gordon that Mithraic scholars must in future start with the Roman evidence, not by outlining Zoroastrian myths and then making the Roman iconography fit that scheme. ... Unless we discover Euboulus' history of Mithraism we are never likely to have conclusive proof for any theory. Perhaps all that can be hoped for is a theory which is in accordance with the evidence and commends itself by (mere) plausibility.")

He discussed Cumont's reconstruction of the bull-slaying scene and stated "that the portrayal of Mithras given by Cumont is not merely unsupported by Iranian texts but is actually in serious conflict with known Iranian theology." (Note: "Indeed, one can go further and say that the portrayal of Mithras given by Cumont is not merely unsupported by Iranian texts but is actually in serious conflict with known Iranian theology. Cumont reconstructs a primordial life of the god on earth, but such a concept is unthinkable in terms of known, specifically Zoroastrian, Iranian thought where the gods never, and apparently never could, live on earth. To interpret Roman Mithraism in terms of Zoroastrian thought and to argue for an earthly life of the god is to combine irreconcilables. If it is believed that Mithras had a primordial life on earth, then the concept of the god has changed so fundamentally that the Iranian background has become virtually irrelevant.") Another paper by R.L. Gordon argued that Cumont severely distorted the available evidence by forcing the material to conform to his predetermined model of Zoroastrian origins. Gordon suggested that the theory of Persian origins was completely invalid and that the Mithraic mysteries in the West were an entirely new creation.

A similar view has been expressed by Luther H. Martin: "Apart from the name of the god himself, in other words, Mithraism seems to have developed largely in and is, therefore, best understood from the context of Roman culture."

According to Hopfe, "All theories of the origin of Mithraism acknowledge a connection, however vague, to the Mithra/Mitra figure of ancient Aryan religion." Reporting on the Second International Congress of Mithraic Studies, 1975, Ugo Bianchi says that although he welcomes "the tendency to question in historical terms the relations between Eastern and Western Mithraism", it "should not mean obliterating what was clear to the Romans themselves, that Mithras was a 'Persian' (in wider perspective: an Indo-Iranian) god."

Boyce wrote, "no satisfactory evidence has yet been adduced to show that, before Zoroaster, the concept of a supreme god existed among the Iranians, or that among them Mithra – or any other divinity – ever enjoyed a separate cult of his or her own outside either their ancient or their Zoroastrian pantheons." She also said that although recent studies have minimized the Iranizing aspects of the self-consciously Persian religion "at least in the form which it attained under the Roman Empire", the name Mithras is enough to show "that this aspect is of some importance." She also says that "the Persian affiliation of the Mysteries is acknowledged in the earliest literary references to them."

Beck tells us that since the 1970s scholars have generally rejected Cumont, but adds that recent theories about how Zoroastrianism was during the period BCE now make some new form of Cumont's east–west transfer possible. (Note: "Since the 1970s scholars of western Mithraism have generally agreed that Cumont's master narrative of east-west transfer is unsustainable"; although he adds that "recent trends in the scholarship on Iranian religion, by modifying the picture of that religion prior to the birth of the western mysteries, now render a revised Cumontian scenario of east-west transfer and continuities now viable.") He says that

... an indubitable residuum of things Persian in the Mysteries and a better knowledge of what constituted actual Mazdaism have allowed modern scholars to postulate for Roman Mithraism a continuing Iranian theology. This indeed is the main line of Mithraic scholarship, the Cumontian model which subsequent scholars accept, modify, or reject. For the transmission of Iranian doctrine from East to West, Cumont postulated a plausible, if hypothetical, intermediary: the Magusaeans of the Iranian diaspora in Anatolia. More problematic – and never properly addressed by Cumont or his successors – is how real-life Roman Mithraists subsequently maintained a quite complex and sophisticated Iranian theology behind an occidental facade. Other than the images at Dura of the two 'magi' with scrolls, there is no direct and explicit evidence for the carriers of such doctrines. ... Up to a point, Cumont's Iranian paradigm, especially in Turcan's modified form, is certainly plausible.

He also says that "the old Cumontian model of formation in, and diffusion from, Anatolia ... is by no means dead – nor should it be."

==== Modern theories ====
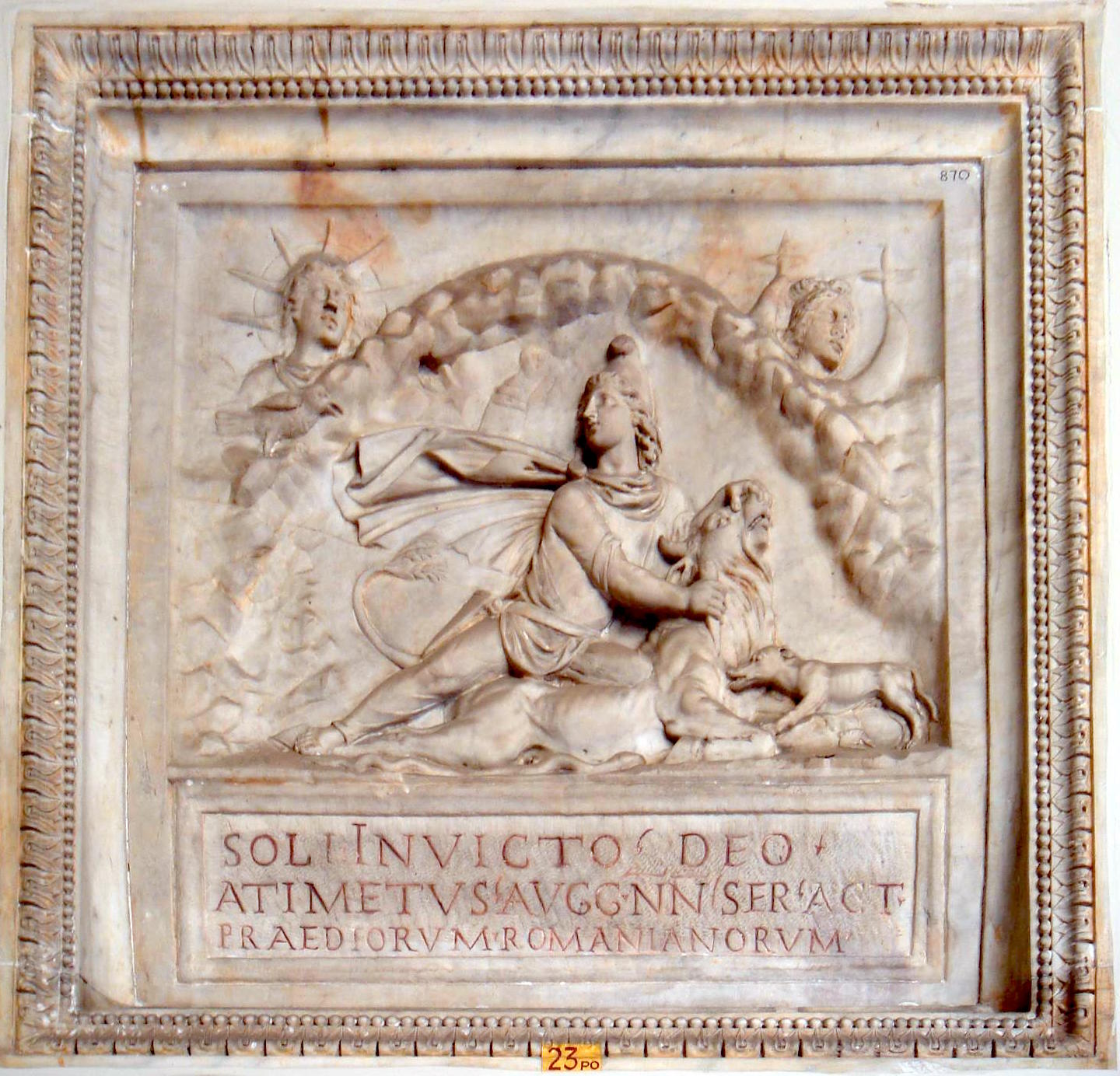
A bas-relief depicting the tauroctony. Mithras is depicted looking to Sol Invictus as he slays the bull. Sol and Luna appear at the top of the relief.

Beck theorizes that the cult was created in Rome, by a single founder who had some knowledge of both Greek and Oriental religion, but suggests that some of the ideas used may have passed through the Hellenistic kingdoms. He observes that "Mithras – moreover, a Mithras who was identified with the Greek Sun god Helios" was among the gods of the syncretic Greco-Armenian-Iranian royal cult at Nemrut, founded by Antiochus I of Commagene in the mid 1st century BCE. While proposing the theory, Beck says that his scenario may be regarded as Cumontian in two ways. Firstly, because it looks again at Anatolia and Anatolians, and more importantly, because it hews back to the methodology first used by Cumont.

Merkelbach suggests that its mysteries were essentially created by a particular person or persons and created in a specific place, the city of Rome, by someone from an eastern province or border state who knew the Iranian myths in detail, which he wove into his new grades of initiation; but that he must have been Greek and Greek-speaking because he incorporated elements of Greek Platonism into it. The myths, he suggests, were probably created in the milieu of the imperial bureaucracy, and for its members. Clauss tends to agree. Beck calls this "the most likely scenario" and states "Until now, Mithraism has generally been treated as if it somehow evolved Topsy-like from its Iranian precursor – a most implausible scenario once it is stated explicitly."

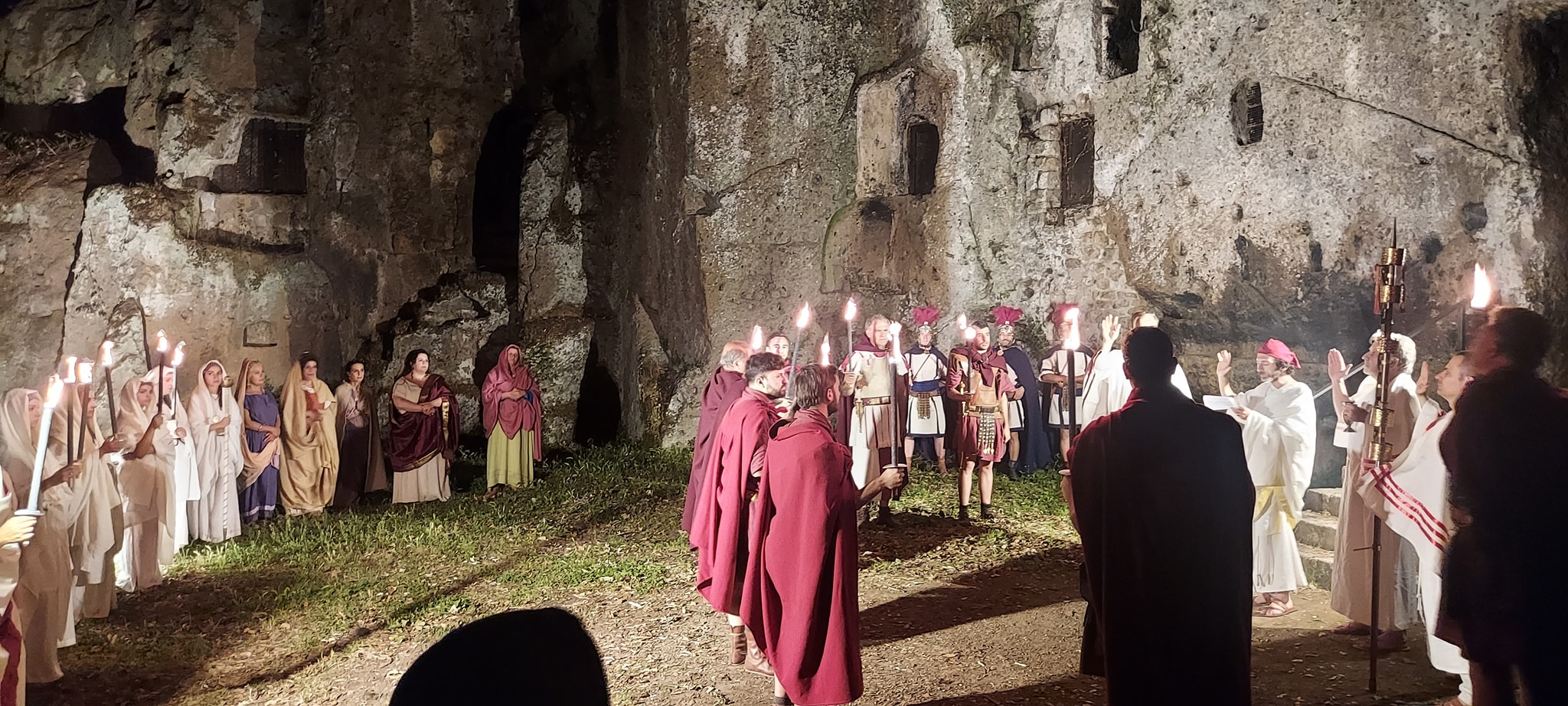
A Mitraic ritual in the Mithraeum of Sutri, officiated by Giuseppe Barbera, Pontefix Maximus of the Roman religious organisation Pietas Comunità Gentile

Archaeologist Lewis M. Hopfe notes that there are only three mithraea in Roman Syria, in contrast to further west. He writes: "Archaeology indicates that Roman Mithraism had its epicenter in Rome ... the fully developed religion known as Mithraism seems to have begun in Rome and been carried to Syria by soldiers and merchants." (Note: "Beyond these three Mithraea [in Syria and Palestine], there are only a handful of objects from Syria that may be identified with Mithraism. Archaeological evidence of Mithraism in Syria is therefore in marked contrast to the abundance of Mithraea and materials that have been located in the rest of the Roman Empire. Both the frequency and the quality of Mithraic materials is greater in the rest of the empire. Even on the western frontier in Britain, archaeology has produced rich Mithraic materials, such as those found at Walbrook. If one accepts Cumont's theory that Mithraism began in Iran, moved west through Babylon to Asia Minor, and then to Rome, one would expect that the cult left its traces in those locations. Instead, archaeology indicates that Roman Mithraism had its epicenter in Rome. Wherever its ultimate place of origin may have been, the fully developed religion known as Mithraism seems to have begun in Rome and been carried to Syria by soldiers and merchants. None of the Mithraic materials or temples in Roman Syria except the Commagene sculpture bears any date earlier than the late first or early second century. [footnote in cited text: 30. Mithras, identified with a Phrygian cap and the nimbus about his head, is depicted in colossal statuary erected by King Antiochus I of Commagene, 69–34 BCE. (see Vermaseren, CIMRM 1.53–56). There are no other literary or archaeological evidences to indicate that the religion of Mithras as it was known among the Romans in the second to fourth centuries AD was practiced in Commagene]. While little can be proved from silence, it seems that the relative lack of archaeological evidence from Roman Syria would argue against the traditional theories for the origins of Mithraism.")

Taking a different view from other modern scholars, Ulansey argues that the Mithraic mysteries began in the Greco-Roman world as a religious response to the discovery by the Greek astronomer Hipparchus of the astronomical phenomenon of the precession of the equinoxes – a discovery that amounted to discovering that the entire cosmos was moving in a hitherto unknown way. This new cosmic motion, he suggests, was seen by the founders of Mithraism as indicating the existence of a powerful new god capable of shifting the cosmic spheres and thereby controlling the universe.

A. D. H. Bivar, L. A. Campbell, and G. Widengren have variously argued that Roman Mithraism represents a continuation of some form of Iranian Mithra worship. More recently, Parvaneh Pourshariati has made similar claims.

According to Antonia Tripolitis, Roman Mithraism originated in Vedic India and picked up many features of the cultures which it encountered in its westward journey. (Note: It originated in Vedic, India, migrated to Persia by way of Babylon, and then westward through the Hellenized East, and finally across the length and breadth of the Hellenistic-Roman world. On its westward journey, it incorporated many of the features of the cultures in which it found itself.)

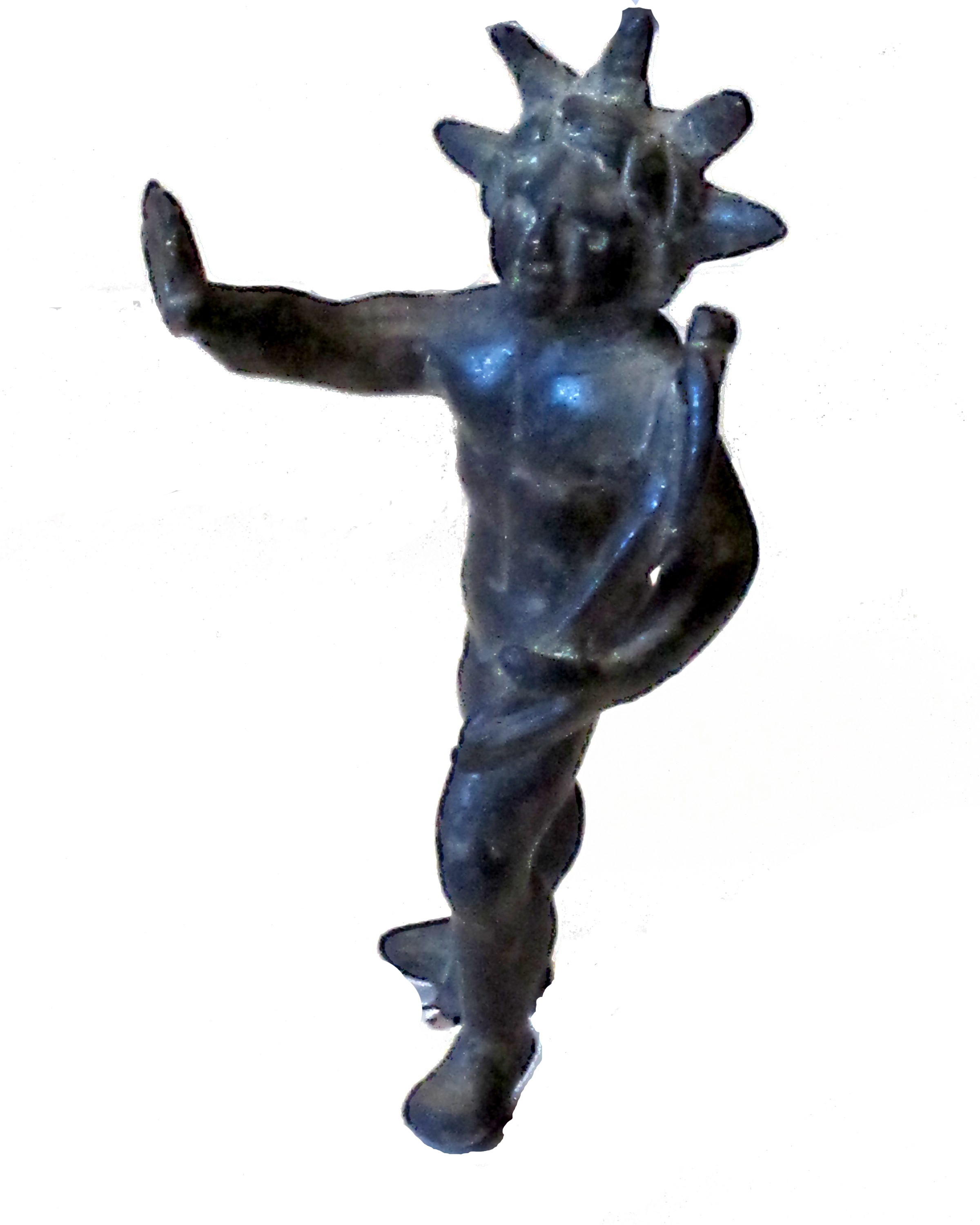
Sol Invictus from the Archaeological Museum of Milan (Museo archeologico)

=== Later history ===
The first important expansion of the mysteries in the Empire seems to have happened quite quickly, late in the reign of Antoninus Pius (b. 121 CE, d. 161 CE) and under Marcus Aurelius. By this time all the key elements of the mysteries were in place. (Note: "The first important expansion of the mysteries in the Empire seems to have occurred relatively rapidly late in the reign of Antoninus Pius and under Marcus Aurelius (9). By that date, it is clear, the mysteries were fully institutionalised and capable of relatively stereotyped self-reproduction through the medium of an agreed, and highly complex, symbolic system reduced in iconography and architecture to a readable set of 'signs'. Yet we have good reason to believe that the establishment of at least some of those signs is to be dated at least as early as the Flavian period or in the very earliest years of the second century. Beyond that we cannot go ...")

Mithraism reached the apogee of its popularity during the 2nd and 3rd centuries, spreading at an "astonishing" rate at the same period when the worship of Sol Invictus was incorporated into the state-sponsored cults. (Note: "... the astonishing spread of the cult in the later 2nd and early 3rd centuries AD ... This extraordinary expansion, documented by the archaeological monuments ...") At this period a certain Pallas devoted a monograph to Mithras, and a little later Euboulus wrote a History of Mithras, although both works are now lost. (Note: Clauss (2000), referring to Porphyry, De Abstinentia, 2.56 and 4.16.3 (for Pallas) and De antro nympharum 6 (for Euboulus and his history).) According to the 4th century Historia Augusta, the emperor Commodus participated in its mysteries but it never became one of the state cults. (Note: "The cult of Mithras never became one of those supported by the state with public funds, and was never admitted to the official list of festivals celebrated by the state and army – at any rate as far as the latter is known to us from the Feriale Duranum, the religious calendar of the units at Dura-Europos in Coele Syria;" [where there was a Mithraeum] "the same is true of all the other mystery cults too." He adds that at the individual level, various individuals did hold roles both in the state cults and the priesthood of Mithras.)

The historian Jacob Burckhardt writes:

Mithras is the guide of souls which he leads from the earthly life into which they had fallen back up to the light from which they issued ... It was not only from the religions and the wisdom of Orientals and Egyptians, even less from Christianity, that the notion that life on earth was merely a transition to a higher life was derived by the Romans. Their own anguish and the awareness of senescence made it plain enough that earthly existence was all hardship and bitterness. Mithras-worship became one, and perhaps the most significant, of the religions of redemption in declining paganism.

=== Persecution and Christianization ===
The religion and its followers faced persecution in the 4th century from Christianization, and Mithraism came to an end at some point between its last decade and the 5th century. Ulansey states that "Mithraism declined with the rise to power of Christianity, until the beginning of the fifth century, when Christianity became strong enough to exterminate by force rival religions such as Mithraism." (Note: "Mithraism declined with the rise to power of Christianity, until the beginning of the fifth century, when Christianity became strong enough to exterminate by force rival religions such as Mithraism.") According to Speidel, Christians fought fiercely with this feared enemy and suppressed it during the late 4th century. Mithraic sanctuaries were destroyed and religion was no longer a matter of personal choice. (Note: "As a mystery religion it engulfed the Roman empire during the first four centuries of our era. Mithraic sanctuaries are found from Roman Arabia to Britain, from the Danube to the Sahara, wherever the Roman soldier went. Christian apologetics fiercely fought the cult they feared., and during the late 4th century CE, as a victim of the Judaeo-Christian spirit of intolerance, Roman Mithraism was suppressed, its sanctuaries destroyed together with the last vestiges of religious freedom in the empire.") (Note: Michael Speidel, who specializes in military history, associates Mithras with Orion.) According to L.H. Martin, Roman Mithraism came to an end with the anti-pagan decrees of the Christian emperor Theodosius during the last decade of the 4th century. (Note: The cult was vigorously opposed by Christian polemicists, especially by Justin and Tertullian, because of perceived similarities between it and early Christianity. And with the anti-pagan decrees of the Christian emperor Theodosius during the final decade of the fourth century, Mithraism disappeared from the history of religions as a viable religious practice.)

Clauss states that inscriptions show Mithras as one of the cults listed on inscriptions by Roman senators who had not converted to Christianity, as part of the "pagan revival" among the elite in the second half of the 4th century. (Note: "Mithras also found a place in the 'pagan revival' that occurred, particularly in the western empire, in the latter half of the 4th century CE. For a brief period, especially in Rome, the cult enjoyed, along with others, a last efflorescence, for which we have evidence from among the highest circles of the senatorial order. One of these senators was Rufius Caeionius Sabinus, who in 377 CE dedicated an altar" to a long list of gods that includes Mithras.) Beck states that "Quite early in the [fourth] century the religion was as good as dead throughout the empire." Archaeological evidence indicates the continuance of the cult of Mithras up until the end of the 4th century. In particular, large numbers of votive coins deposited by worshippers have been recovered at the Mithraeum at Pons Sarravi (Sarrebourg) in Gallia Belgica, in a series that runs from Gallienus (r. 253–268) to Theodosius I (r. 379–395). These were scattered over the floor when the mithraeum was destroyed, as Christians apparently regarded the coins as polluted; therefore, providing reliable dates for the functioning of the mithraeum up until near the end of the century.

Franz Cumont states that Mithraism may have survived in certain remote cantons of the Alps and Vosges into the 5th century. According to Mark Humphries, the deliberate concealment of Mithraic cult objects in some areas suggests that precautions were being taken against Christian attacks. In areas like the Rhine frontier, barbarian invasions may have also played a role in the end of Mithraism.

At some of the mithraeums that have been found below churches, such as the Santa Prisca Mithraeum and the San Clemente Mithraeum, the ground plan of the church above was made in a way to symbolize Christianity's domination of Mithraism. The cult disappeared earlier than that of Isis. Isis was still remembered in the Middle Ages as a pagan deity, but Mithras was already forgotten in late antiquity.

== Interpretations of the bull-slaying scene ==
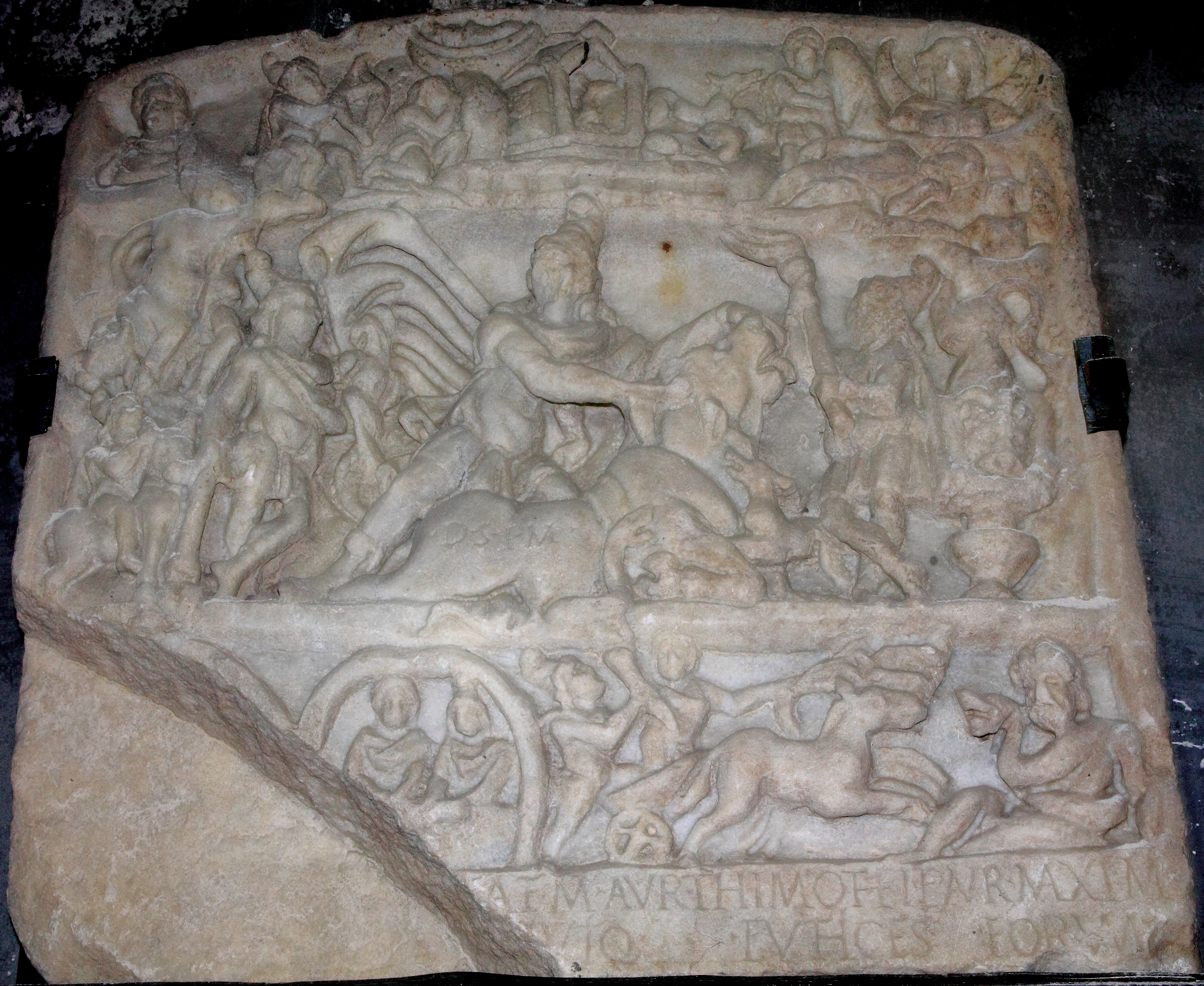
Unusual tauroctony at the Brukenthal National Museum

According to Cumont, the imagery of the tauroctony was a Graeco-Roman representation of an event in Zoroastrian cosmogony described in a 9th-century Zoroastrian text, the Bundahishn. In this text the evil spirit Ahriman (not Mithra) slays the primordial creature Gavaevodata, which is represented as a bovine. (Note: "19. He let loose Greed, Needfulness, [Pestilence,] Disease, Hunger, Illness, Vice and Lethargy on the body of Gav' and Gayomard. 20. Before his coming to the 'Gav', Ohrmazd gave the healing Cannabis, which is what one calls 'banj', to the' Gav' to eat, and rubbed it before her eyes, so that her discomfort, owing to smiting, [sin] and injury, might decrease; she immediately became feeble and ill, her milk dried up, and she passed away.") Cumont held that a version of the myth must have existed in which Mithras, not Ahriman, killed the bovine. But according to Hinnells, no such variant of the myth is known, and that this is merely speculation: "In no known Iranian text [either Zoroastrian or otherwise] does Mithra slay a bull."

David Ulansey finds astronomical evidence from the mithraeum itself. (Note: Ulansey, David (1989). The Origins of the Mithraic Mysteries. Oxford University Press. ISBN 0-19-505402-4. (1991 revised edition)) He reminds us that the Platonic writer Porphyry wrote in the 3rd century CE that the cave-like temple Mithraea depicted "an image of the world" (Note: 10: "Since, however, a cavern is an image and symbol of the world ...") and that Zoroaster consecrated a cave resembling the world fabricated by Mithras. (Note: 2: "For, as Eubulus says, Zoroaster was the first who consecrated in the neighbouring mountains of Persia, a spontaneously produced cave, florid, and having fountains, in honour of Mithra, the maker and father of all things; 12: a cave, according to Zoroaster, bearing a resemblance of the world, which was fabricated by Mithra. But the things contained in the cavern being arranged according to commensurate intervals, were symbols of the mundane elements and climates.") The ceiling of the Caesarea Maritima Mithraeum retains traces of blue paint, which may mean the ceiling was painted to depict the sky and the stars.

Beck has given the following celestial composition of the Tauroctony:

Component of Tauroctony	Celestial counterpart
Bull	Taurus
Sol	Sun
Luna	Moon
Dog	Canis Minor, Canis Major
Snake	Hydra, Serpens, Draco
Raven	Corvus
Scorpion	Scorpius
Wheat's ear (on bull's tail)	Spica
Twins Cautes and Cautopates	Gemini
Lion	Leo
Crater	Crater
Cave	Universe

Several celestial identities for the Tauroctonous Mithras (TM) himself have been proposed. Beck summarizes them in the table below.

Scholar	Identifies tauroctonous Mithras (TM) as
Bausani, A. (1979)	TM associated with Leo, in that the tauroctony is a type of the ancient lion–bull (Leo–Taurus) combat motif.
Beck, R.L. (1994)	TM = Sun in Leo
Insler, S. (1978)	[tauroctony = heliacal setting of Taurus]
Jacobs, B. (1999)	[tauroctony = heliacal setting of Taurus]
North, J.D. (1990)	TM = Betelgeuse (Alpha Orionis) setting, TM knife = Triangulum setting, TM cloak = Capella (Alpha Aurigae) setting.
Rutgers, A.J. (1970)	TM = Sun, Bull = Moon
Sandelin, K.-G. (1988)	TM = Auriga
Speidel, M.P. (1980)	TM = Orion
Ulansey, D. (1989)	TM = Perseus
Weiss, M. (1994, 1998)	TM = the Night Sky

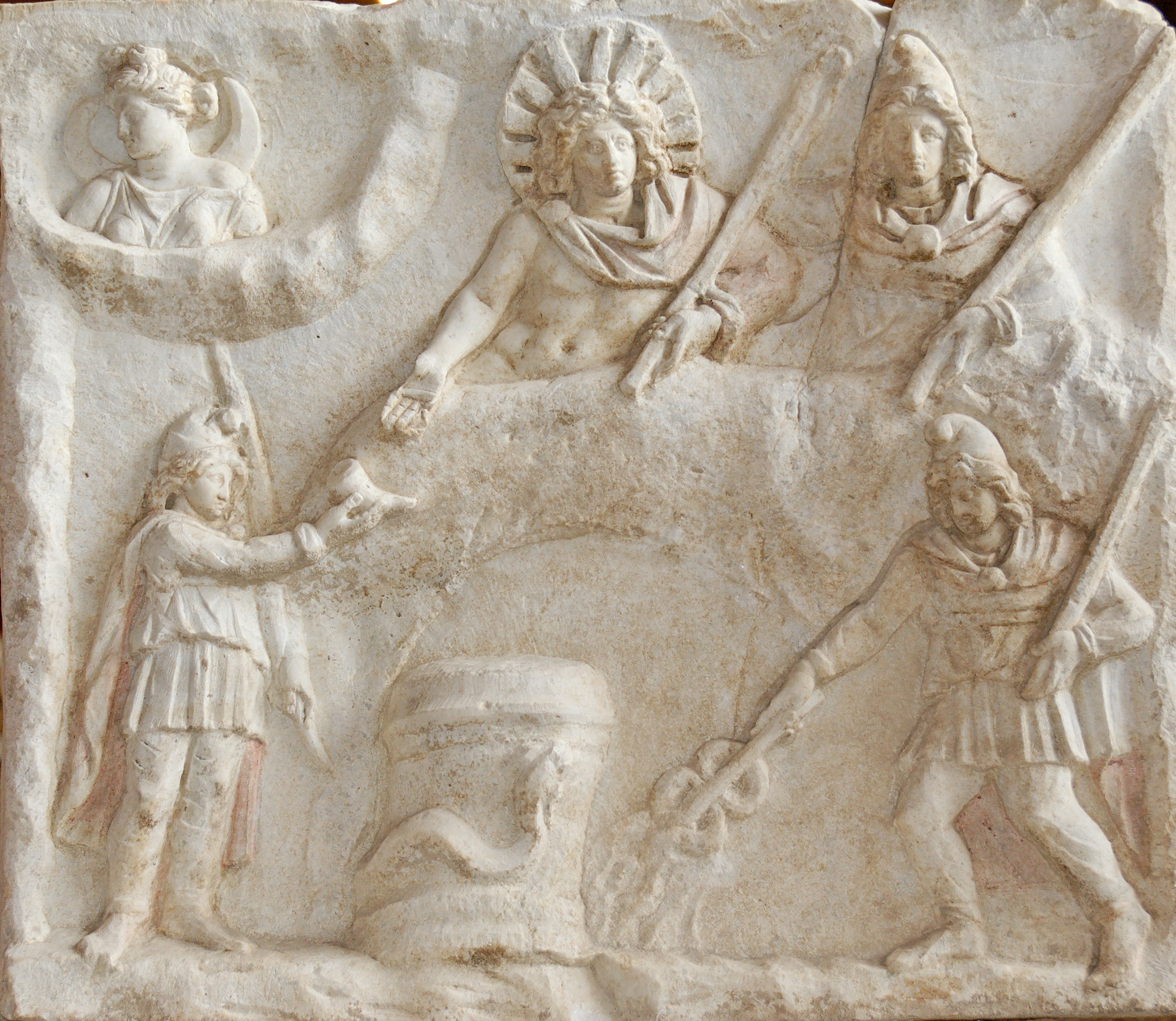
Sol and Mithras banqueting with Luna and the twin divinities Cautes and Cautopates, his attendants. Side B of a double-sided Roman marble relief, 2nd or 3rd century CE

Ulansey has proposed that Mithras seems to have been derived from the constellation of Perseus, which is positioned just above Taurus in the night sky. He sees iconographic and mythological parallels between the two figures: both are young heroes, carry a dagger, and wear a Phrygian cap. He also mentions the similarity of the image of Perseus killing the Gorgon and the tauroctony, both figures being associated with caverns and both having connections to Persia as further evidence. Michael Speidel associates Mithras with the constellation of Orion because of the proximity to Taurus, and the consistent nature of the depiction of the figure as having wide shoulders, a garment flared at the hem, and narrowed at the waist with a belt, thus taking on the form of the constellation.

In opposition to the theories above, which link Mithras to specific constellations, Jelbert suggests that the deity represented the Milky Way. Jelbert argues that within the tauroctony image, Mithras' body is analogous to the path of the Milky Way that bridges Taurus and Scorpius, and that this bifurcated section mirrors the shape, scale and position of the deity relative to the other characters in the scene. The notion of Mithras as the Milky Way would have resonated with his status as god of light and lord of genesis, suggests Jelbert, due to the luminosity of this celestial feature, as well as the location of the traditional soul gates at Taurus-Gemini and Scorpius- Sagittarius, portals once believed to represent the points of entry for the soul at birth and death respectively.

Beck has criticized Speidel and Ulansey of adherence to a literal cartographic logic, describing their theories as a "will-o'-the-wisp" that "lured them down a false trail". He argues that a literal reading of the tauroctony as a star chart raises two major problems: it is difficult to find a constellation counterpart for Mithras himself (despite efforts by Speidel and Ulansey) and that, unlike in a star chart, each feature of the tauroctony might have more than a single counterpart. Rather than seeing Mithras as a constellation, Beck argues that Mithras is the prime traveller on the celestial stage (represented by the other symbols of the scene), the Unconquered Sun moving through the constellations. But again, Meyer holds that the Mithras Liturgy reflects the world of Mithraism and may be a confirmation for Ulansey's theory of Mithras being held responsible for the precession of equinoxes. (Note: ... The Mithras Liturgy reflects the world of Mithraism, but precisely how it relates to other expressions of the mysteries of Mithras is unclear. ... With the leg of the bull, interpreted astronomically, the Mithraic god, or Mithras, turns the sphere of heaven around, and if the text suggests that Mithras "moves heaven and turns it back (antistrephousa)," Mithras may be responsible for the astronomical precession of the equinoxes, the progressive change in the earth's orientation in space caused by a wobble in the earth's rotation (so Ulansey).)

Peter Chrisp posits that the killing was of a "sacred bull" and that the "act [was] believed" to create the universe's life force and maintain it.

== Comparable belief systems ==
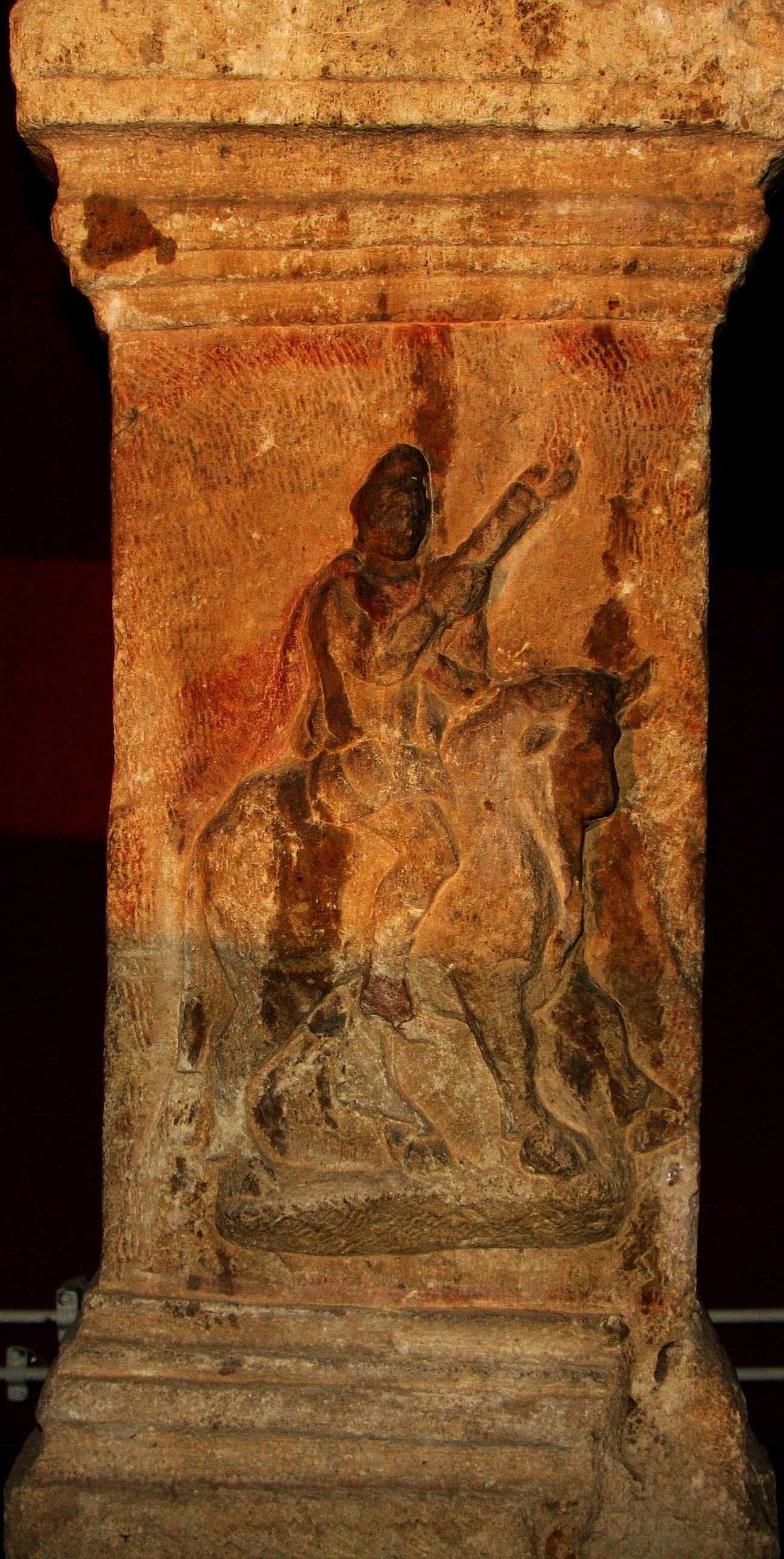
A Mithraic altar depicting Cautes riding a bull, Sibiu/Hermannstadt, Romania

The cult of Mithras was part of the syncretic nature of ancient Roman religion. Almost all Mithraea contain statues dedicated to gods of other cults, and it is common to find inscriptions dedicated to Mithras in other sanctuaries, especially those of Jupiter Dolichenus. Mithraism was not an alternative to Rome's other traditional religions, but was one of many forms of religious practice, and many Mithraic initiates can also be found participating in the civic religion, and as initiates of other mystery cults.

=== Christianity ===
Early Christian apologists noted similarities between Mithraic and Christian rituals, but nonetheless took an extremely negative view of Mithraism: they interpreted Mithraic rituals as evil copies of Christian ones. For instance, Tertullian wrote that as a prelude to the Mithraic initiation ceremony, the initiate was given a ritual bath and at the end of the ceremony, received a mark on the forehead. This mark on the forehead may have likely been the Latin letter, "M", which stood for the name of their messianic god-king Mithras. Tertullian also described these rites as a diabolical counterfeit of the baptism and chrismation of Christians. Justin Martyr contrasted Mithraic initiation communion with the Eucharist:

Wherefore also the evil demons in mimicry have handed down that the same thing should be done in the Mysteries of Mithras. For that bread and a cup of water are in these mysteries set before the initiate with certain speeches you either know or can learn.

Ernest Renan suggested in 1882 that, under different circumstances, Mithraism might have risen to the prominence of modern-day Christianity. Renan wrote: "If the growth of Christianity had been arrested by some mortal malady, the world would have been Mithraic". (Note: "I sometimes permit myself to say that, if Christianity had not carried the day, Mithraicism would have become the religion of the world. It had its mysterious meetings: its chapels, which bore a strong resemblance to little churches. It forged a very lasting bond of brotherhood between its initiates: it had a Eucharist, a Supper ..." — Renan (2004)) This theory has since been contested. Leonard Boyle wrote in 1987 that "too much ... has been made of the 'threat' of Mithraism to Christianity", pointing out that there are only fifty known mithraea in the entire city of Rome. J.A. Ezquerra holds that since the two religions did not share similar aims, there was never any real threat of Mithraism taking over the Roman world. (Note: "Many people have erroneously supposed that all religions have a sort of universalist tendency or ambition. In the case of Mithraism, such an ambition has often been taken for granted and linked to a no less questionable assumption, that there was a rivalry between Mithras and Christ for imperial favour. ... If Christianity had failed, the Roman empire would never have become Mithraist.") Mithraism had backing from the Roman aristocracy during a time when their conservative values were seen as under attack during the rising tides of Christianity.

According to Mary Boyce, Mithraism was a potent enemy for Christianity in the West, though she is sceptical about its hold in the East. (Note: "Mithraism proselytized energetically to the west, and for a time presented a formidable challenge to Christianity; but it is not yet known how far, or how effectively, it penetrated eastward. A Mithraeum has been uncovered at the Parthian fortress-town of Dura-Europos on the Euphrates; but Zoroastrianism itself may well have been a barrier to its spread into Iran proper.") F. Coarelli (1979) has tabulated forty actual or possible Mithraea and estimated that Rome would have had "not less than 680–690" mithraea. (Note: A useful topographic survey, with map, by F. Coarelli (1979) lists 40 actual or possible mithraea (the latter inferred from find-spots, with the sensible proviso that a mithraeum will not necessarily correspond to every find). Principally from comparisons of size and population with Ostia, Coarelli calculates that there will have been in Rome "not less than 680–690" mithraea in all ... .) L.M. Hopfe states that more than 400 Mithraic sites have been found. These sites are spread all over the Roman empire from places as far as Dura-Europos in the east, and England in the west. He, too, says that Mithraism may have been a rival of Christianity. (Note: Today more than four hundred locations of Mithraic worship have been identified in every area of the Roman Empire. Mithraea have been found as far west as Britain and as far east as Dura-Europas. Between the second and fourth centuries C.E. Mithraism may have vied with Christianity for domination of the Roman world.) David Ulansey thinks Renan's statement "somewhat exaggerated", (Note: ... the study of Mithraism is also of great important for our understanding of what Arnold Toynbee has called the 'Crucible of Christianity', the cultural matrix in which the Christian religion came to birth out of the civilization of the ancient Mediterranean. For Mithraism was one of Christianity's major competitors in the Roman Empire ... No doubt Renan's statement is somewhat exaggerated. — D. Ulansey (1991)) but does consider Mithraism "one of Christianity's major competitors in the Roman Empire".

== See also ==
- London Mithraeum
- Maitreya
- Mithra
- Mehregan
- Roman–Iranian relations
- Santo Stefano al Monte Celio#Mithraeum
- Tienen Mithraeum
- Mithraic Reliefs of Jort
- Helmet of Coțofenești – dated to about 450 BCE, before the beginning of Roman Mithraism
