= Zurvanism =

Extinct branch of Zoroastrianism

Zurvanism was a fatalistic religious movement of Zoroastrianism in which the divinity Zurvan is a first principle (primordial creator deity) who engendered equal-but-opposite twins, Ahura Mazda and Angra Mainyu. Zurvanism is also known as "Zurvanite Zoroastrianism", and may be contrasted with Mazdaism.

In Zurvanism, Zurvan was perceived as the god of infinite time and space and also known as "one" or "alone." Zurvan was portrayed as a transcendental and neutral god without passion; one for whom there was no distinction between good and evil. The name Zurvan is a normalized rendition of the word, which in Middle Persian appears as either Zurvān, Zruvān or Zarvān. The Middle Persian name derives from Avestan (Avestan: 𐬰𐬭𐬎𐬎𐬁𐬥, romanized: zruuān, lit. 'time', a grammatically neuter noun).

Scholars have argued that Zurvanism was the official state religion of the Sasanians.

== Origins and background ==
Although the details of the origin and development of Zurvanism remain murky (for a summary of the three opposing opinions see § Ascent and acceptance below), it is generally accepted that Zurvanism was:

(1) a branch of greater Zoroastrianism;
(2) a sacerdotal response to resolve a perceived inconsistency in the sacred texts (see § The "twin brother" doctrine below);
(3) probably introduced during the second half of the Achaemenid era.

Zurvanism enjoyed royal sanction during the Sasanian Empire (226–651 CE) but no traces of it remain beyond the 10th century.

== Evidence of the cult ==
The earliest evidence of the cult of Zurvan is found in the History of Theology, attributed to Eudemus of Rhodes (c. 370–300 BCE). As cited in Damascius's Difficulties and Solutions of First Principles (6th century CE), Eudemus describes a sect of the Medes that considered Space/Time to be the primordial "father" of the rivals Oromasdes "of light" and Arimanius "of darkness".

The principal evidence for Zurvanite doctrine occurs in the polemical Christian tracts of Armenian and Syriac writers of the Sasanian period (224–651 CE). Indigenous sources of information from the same period are the 3rd century Kartir inscription at Ka'ba-ye Zartosht and the early 4th-century edict of Mihr-Narseh, the mowbadān-mowbad or high priest under Yazdegerd I, the latter being the only native evidence from the Sasanian period that is frankly Zurvanite. The post-Sasanian Zoroastrian Middle Persian commentaries are primarily Mazdean and with only one exception (the 10th century Denkard 9.30) do not mention Zurvan at all.

Of the remaining so-called Pahlavi books, only two, the Mēnōg-i Khrad and the Selections of Zādspram (both 9th century) reveal a Zurvanite tendency. The latter, in which the priest Zādspram chastises his brother's un-Mazdaean ideas, is the last text in Middle Persian that provides any evidence of the cult of Zurvan. The 13th century Zoroastrian Ulema-i Islam ([Response] to Doctors of Islam), a New Persian apologetic text, is unambiguously Zurvanite and is also the last direct evidence of Zurvan as a First Principle.

There is no hint of any worship of Zurvan in any of the texts of the Avesta, even though the texts (as they exist today) are the result of a Sasanian-era redaction. Robert Charles Zaehner proposed that this is because the individual Sasanian monarchs were not always Zurvanite and that Mazdean Zoroastrianism just happened to have the upper hand during the short but crucial period that the canon was finally written down. In the texts composed prior to the Sasanian period, Zurvan appears twice, as both an abstract concept and as a minor divinity, but there is no evidence of a cult. In Yasna 72.10 Zurvan is invoked in the company of Space and Air (Vata-Vayu) and in Yasht 13.56, the plants grow in the manner Time has ordained according to the will of Ahura Mazda and the Amesha Spentas. Two other references to Zurvan are also present in the Vendidad, but although these are late additions to the canon, they again do not establish any evidence of a cult. Zurvan does not appear in any listing of the Yazatas.

== History and development ==
=== Ascent and acceptance ===
The origins of the cult of Zurvan remain debated. One view (the primary thesis) considers Zurvanism to have developed out of Zoroastrianism as a reaction to the liberalization of the late Achaemenid-era form of the faith. Another view (Note: "Swedish-school" theory, e.g. Nyberg (1931) reiterated by Zaehner (1955).) proposes that Zurvan existed as a pre-Zoroastrian divinity that was incorporated into Zoroastrianism. The third view is that Zurvanism is the product of the contact between Zoroastrianism and Babylonian–Akkadian religions (for a summary of opposing views see Boyce).

Certain however is that by the Sasanian Empire (226–651), the divinity "Infinite Time" was well established, and – as inferred from a Manichaean text presented to Shapur I, in which the name Zurvan was adopted for Manichaeism's primordial "Father of Greatness" – enjoyed royal patronage. It was during the reign of Sasanian Emperor Shapur I (241–272 CE) that Zurvanism appears to have developed as a cult and it was presumably in this period that Greek and Indic concepts were introduced to Zurvanite Zoroastrianism.

It is however not known whether Sasanian-era Zurvanism and Mazdaism were separate sects, each with their own organization and priesthood, or simply two tendencies within the same body. That Mazdaism and Zurvanism competed for attention has been inferred from the works of Christian and Manichaean polemicists, but the doctrinal incompatibilities were not so extreme "that they could not be reconciled under the broad aegis of an imperial church". More likely is that the two sects served different segments of Sasanian society, with dispassionate Zurvanism primarily operating as a mystic cult and passionate Mazdaism serving the community at large.

=== Decline and disappearance ===
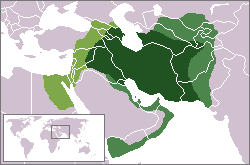
The Sasanian Empire at its greatest extent (c. 610 CE)

Following the fall of the Sasanian Empire in the 7th century, Zoroastrianism was gradually supplanted by Islam. The former continued to exist but in an increasingly reduced state, and by the 10th century the remaining Zoroastrians appear to have more closely followed the orthodoxy as found in the Pahlavi books (see also § The legacy of Zurvanism below).

Why the cult of Zurvan vanished, while Mazdaism did not, remains an issue of scholarly debate. Arthur Christensen, one of the first proponents of the theory that Zurvanism was the state religion of the Sasanians, suggested that the rejection of Zurvanism in the post-conquest epoch was a response and reaction to the new authority of Islamic monotheism that brought about a deliberate reform of Zoroastrianism that aimed to establish a stronger orthodoxy. Zaehner is of the opinion that the Zurvanite priesthood had a "strict orthodoxy which few could tolerate. Moreover, they interpreted the Prophet's message so dualistically that their God was made to appear very much less than all-powerful and all-wise. As reasonable as it might have appeared from a purely intellectual point of view, such an absolute dualism had neither the appeal of a real monotheism nor any mystical element with which to nourish its inner life."

Another possible explanation postulated by Boyce is that Mazdaism and Zurvanism were divided regionally; that is, with Mazdaism being the predominant tendency in the regions to the north and east (Bactria, Margiana, and other satrapies closest to Zoroaster's homeland), while Zurvanism was prominent in regions to the south and west (closer to Babylonian and Greek influence). This is supported by Manichaean evidence that indicates that 3rd century Mazdean Zoroastrianism had its stronghold in Parthia, to the northeast. Following the fall of the Persian Empire, the south and west were relatively quickly assimilated under the banner of Islam, while the north and east remained independent for some time before these regions too were absorbed. This could also explain why Armenian/Syriac observations reveal a distinctly Zurvanite Zoroastrianism, and inversely, could explain the strong Greek and Babylonian connection and interaction with Zurvanism (see § Types of Zurvanism below).

== The "twin brother" doctrine ==
"Classical Zurvanism" is a term coined by Zaehner to denote the movement to explain the inconsistency of Zoroaster's description of the "twin spirits" as they appear in Yasna 30.3–5 of the Avesta. According to Zaehner, this "Zurvanism proper" was

genuinely Iranian and Zoroastrian in that it sought to clarify the enigma of the twin spirits that Zoroaster left unsolved.

As the priesthood sought to explain it, if the Malevolent Spirit (lit: Angra Mainyu) and the Benevolent Spirit (Spenta Mainyu, identified with Ahura Mazda) were twins, then they must have had a parent, who must have existed before them. The priesthood settled on Zurvan – the hypostasis of (Infinite) Time – as being "the only possible 'Absolute' from whom the twins could proceed" and which was the source of good in the one and the source of evil in the other.

The Zurvanite "twin brother" doctrine is also evident in Zurvanism's cosmogonical creation myth; the classic form of the creation myth does not contradict the Mazdean model of the origin and evolution of the universe, which begins where the Zurvanite model ends. It may well be that the Zurvanite cosmogony was an adaptation of an antecedent Hellenic Chronos cosmogony that portrayed Infinite Time as the "Father of Time" (not to be confused with the Titan Cronus, father of Zeus) whom the Greeks equated with Oromasdes, i.e. Ohrmuzd / Ahura Mazda.

=== Creation story ===
The classic Zurvanite model of creation, preserved only by non-Zoroastrian sources, proceeds as follows:

In the beginning, the great God Zurvan existed alone. Desiring offspring that would create "heaven and hell and everything in between", Zurvan sacrificed for a thousand years. Towards the end of this period, androgyne Zurvan began to doubt the efficacy of sacrifice and in the moment of this doubt Ohrmuzd and Ahriman were conceived: Ohrmuzd for the sacrifice and Ahriman for the doubt. Upon realizing that twins were to be born, Zurvan resolved to grant the first-born sovereignty over creation. Ohrmuzd perceived Zurvan's decision, which He then communicated to His brother. Ahriman then preempted Ohrmuzd by ripping open the womb to emerge first. Reminded of the resolution to grant Ahriman sovereignty, Zurvan conceded, but limited kingship to a period of 9,000 years, after which Ohrmuzd would rule for all eternity.

Christian and Manichaean missionaries considered this doctrine to be exemplary of the Zoroastrian faith and it was these and similar texts that first reached the west. Corroborated by Anquetil-Duperron's "erroneous rendering" of Vendidad 19.9, these led to the late 18th-century century conclusion that Infinite Time was the first Principle of Zoroastrianism and Ohrmuzd was therefore only "the derivative and secondary character". Ironically, the fact that no Zoroastrian texts contained any hint of the born-of-Zurvan doctrine was considered to be evidence of a latter-day corruption of the original principles. The opinion that Zoroastrianism was so severely dualistic that it was, in fact, ditheistic or even tritheistic would be widely held until the late 19th century.

=== Zurvan wife ===
In some Zurvanite narratives, it is mentioned that Zurvan had a wife and had children with Ahura Mazda and Ahriman, later, Ahura Mazda married his mother and had children with her, including the sun, dogs, pigs, donkeys, and cattle.

== Types of Zurvanism ==
According to Zaehner, the doctrine of the cult of Zurvan appears to have three schools of thought, each to a different degree influenced by alien philosophies, which he calls

- materialist Zurvanism,
- ascetic Zurvanism, and
- fatalistic Zurvanism.

These are described in the following subsections. Zaehner proposes that each of three arose out of the classical Zurvanism.

=== Materialist Zurvanism ===
Materialist Zurvanism was influenced by the Aristotelian and Empedoclean view of matter, and took "some very queer forms" according to Zaehner.

While Zoroaster's Ormuzd created the universe with his thought, materialist Zurvanism challenged the concept that anything could be made out of nothing. This challenge was a patently alien idea, discarding core Zoroastrian tenets in favor of the position that the spiritual world – including heaven and hell, reward and punishment – did not exist.

The fundamental division of the material and spiritual is not altogether foreign to the Avesta; Geti and Mainyu (middle Persian: menog) are terms in Mazdaist tradition, where Ahura Mazda is said to have created all first in its spiritual, then later in its material form. But the material Zurvanites redefined menog to suit Aristotelian principles to mean "that which did not (yet) have matter", or alternatively, "that which was still the unformed primal matter". Even this is not necessarily a violation of orthodox Zoroastrian tradition, since the divinity Vayu is present in the middle space between Ormuzd and Ahriman, the void separating the kingdoms of light and darkness.

=== Ascetic Zurvanism ===
Ascetic Zurvanism, which was apparently not as popular as the materialistic kind, viewed Zurvan as undifferentiated Time, which, under the influence of desire, divided into reason (a male principle) and concupiscence (a female principle).

According to Duchesne-Guillemin, this division is "redolent of Gnosticism or – still better – of Indian cosmology". The parallels between Zurvan and Prajapati of Rig Veda 10.129 had been taken by Widengren to be evidence of a proto-Indo-Iranian Zurvan, but these arguments have since been questioned. Nonetheless, there is a semblance of Zurvanite elements in Vedic texts, and, as Zaehner puts it, "Time, for the Indians, is the raw material, the materia prima of all contingent being."

=== Fatalistic Zurvanism ===
The doctrine of Limited Time (allotted to Ahriman by Zurvan) implied that nothing could change this preordained course of the material universe, and the path of the astral bodies of the 'heavenly sphere' was representative of this preordained course. It followed that human destiny must then be decided by the constellations, stars and planets, who were divided between the good (the signs of the Zodiac) and the evil (the planets):

Ohrmazd allotted happiness to man, but if man did not receive it, it was owing to the extortion of these planets.

— Menog-i Khirad 38.4–5

Fatalistic Zurvanism was evidently influenced by Chaldean astrology and perhaps also by Aristotle's theory of chance and fortune. The fact that Armenian and Syrian commentators translated Zurvan as "Fate" is highly suggestive.

== Mistaken identity ==
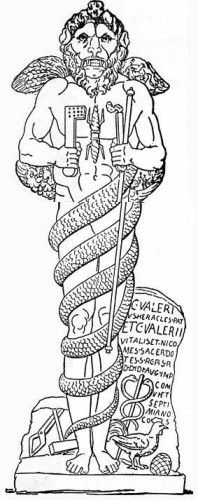
Drawing of the leontocephaline found at a mithraeum in Ostia Antica, Italy (190 CE; CIMRM 312)

In his first manuscript of his book Zurvan, Zaehner identified the leontocephalic deity of the Roman Mithraic Mysteries as a representation of Zurvan. Zaehner later acknowledged this mis-identification as a "positive mistake", due to Franz Cumont's late 19th century notion that the Roman cult was "Roman Mazdaism" transmitted to the west by Iranian priests. Mithraic scholars no longer follow this so-called 'continuity theory', but that has not stopped the fallacy (which Zaehner also attributes to Cumont) from proliferating on the Internet.

== Negative view of women ==
Robert Charles Zaehner mentions that in Zurvanism fire and water are mentioned as male and female and water is considered a dark element and says that Zoroastrian texts in Pahlavi language mention two stories: the first is about women submitting to Ahriman, and the second is a long story about the harlot helping Ahriman fight Ahura Mazda and Keyumars. Christian Syriac writer Theodore bar Konai's translation reads:

'After Ohrmazd had given women to righteous men, they fled and went over to Satan; and when Ohrmazd provided righteous men with peace and happiness, Satan provided women too with happiness. As Satan had allowed the women to ask for anything they wanted, Ohrmazd feared that they might ask to have intercourse with the righteous men and that these might suffer damage thereby. Seeking to avoid this, he created the god Narseh [a youth] of fifteen years of age. And he put him, naked as he was, behind Satan so that the women should see him, desire him, and ask Satan for him. The women lifted their hands up towards Satan and said: "Satan, our father, give us the god Narseh as a gift."'

and

'When the Destructive Spirit saw that he himself and the demons were powerless on account of the Righteous Man, he swooned away. For three thousand years he lay in a swoon. And as he lay thus unconscious, the demons with monstrous heads cried out one by one [saying] "Arise, O our father, for we would join a battle from which Ohrmazd and the Bounteous Immortals will suffer straitness and misery." And one by one they minutely related their own evil deeds. But the accursed Destructive Spirit was not comforted, nor he did arise out of his swoon for fear of the Righteous Man; till the accursed Whore came after the three thousand years had run their course, and she cried out [saying]: "Arise, O our father, for in the battle [to come] I shall let loose so much affliction on the Righteous Man and the toiling Bull that, because of my deeds, they will not be fit to live. I shall take away their dignity (khwarr): I shall afflict the water, I shall afflict the earth, I shall afflict the fire, I shall afflict the plants, I shall afflict all the creation which Ohrmazd has created." And she related her evil deeds so minutely that the Destructive Spirit was comforted, leapt up out of his swoon, and kissed the head of the Whore; and that pollution called menstruation appeared on the Whore. And the Destructive Spirit cried out to the demon Whore: "Whatsoever is thy desire, that do thou ask, that I may give it thee." Then Ohrmazd in his omniscience knew that at that time the Destructive Spirit could give whatever the demon Whore asked and that there would be great profit to him thereby. (The appearance of the body of the Destructive Spirit was in the form of a frog.) And [Ohrmazd] showed one like unto a young man of fifteen years of age to the demon Whore; and the demon Whore fastened her thoughts on him. And the demon Whore cried out to the Destructive Spirit [saying]: "Give me desire for man that I may seat him in the house as my lord." But the Destructive Spirit cried out unto her [saying]: "I do not bid thee ask for anything, for thou knowest [only] to ask for what is profitless and bad." But the time had passed when he could have refused to give what she asked.

== The legacy of Zurvanism ==
No evidence of distinctly Zurvanite rituals or practices have been discovered, so followers of the cult are widely believed to have had the same rituals and practices as Mazdean Zoroastrians did. This is understandable, inasmuch as the Zurvanite doctrine of a monist First Principle did not preclude the worship of Ohrmuzd as the Creator (of the good creation). Similarly, no explicitly Zurvanite elements appear to have survived in modern Zoroastrianism.

Dhalla explicitly accepted a modern Western version of the old Zurvanite heresy, according to which Ahura Mazda himself was the hypothetical 'father' of the twin Spirits of Y 30.3 ... Yet though Dhalla thus, under foreign influences, abandoned the fundamental doctrine of the absolute separation of good and evil, his book still breathes the sturdy, unflinching spirit of orthodox Zoroastrian dualism.

— Mary Boyce

Zurvanism begins with a heterodox interpretation of Zarathushtra's Gathas:

Yes, there are two fundamental spirits, twins which are renowned to be in conflict. In thought and in word, in action they are two: the good and the bad.

— Y 30.3 (trans. Insler)

Then shall I speak of the two primal Spirits of existence, of whom the Very Holy thus spoke to the Evil One: "Neither our thoughts nor teachings nor wills, neither or words nor choices nor acts, not our inner selves nor our souls agree."

— Y 45.2

A literal, anthropomorphic "twin brother" interpretation of these passages gave rise to a need to postulate a father for the postulated literal "brothers". Hence Zurvanism postulated a preceding parent deity that existed above the good and evil of his sons. This was an obvious usurpation of Zoroastrian dualism, a sacrilege against the moral preeminence of Ahura Mazda.

The pessimism evident in fatalistic Zurvanism existed in stark contradiction to the positive moral force of Mazdaism, and was a direct violation of one of Zoroaster's great contributions to religious philosophy: his uncompromising doctrine of free will. In Yasna 30.2 and 45.9, Ahura Mazda "has left to men's wills" to choose between doing good and doing evil. By leaving destiny in the hands of fate (an omnipotent deity), the cult of Zurvan distanced itself from the most sacred of Zoroastrian tenets: that of the efficacy of good thoughts, good words and good deeds.

That the Zurvanite view of creation was an apostasy even for medieval Zoroastrians is apparent from the 10th century Denkard, which in a commentary on Yasna 30.3–5 turns what the Zurvanites considered the words of the prophet into Zoroaster recalling "a proclamation of the Demon of Envy to mankind that Ohrmuzd and Ahriman were two in one womb".

The fundamental goal of "classical Zurvanism" to bring the doctrine of the "twin spirits" in accord with what was otherwise understood of Zoroaster's teaching may have been excessive, but (according to Zaehner) it was not altogether misguided. In noting the emergence of an overtly dualistic doctrine during the Sasanian period, Zaehner asserted that

[There must] have been a party within the Zoroastrian community which regarded the strict dualism between Truth and the Lie, the Holy Spirit and the Destructive Spirit, as being the essence of the Prophet's message. Otherwise the re-emergence of this strictly dualist form of Zoroastrianism some six centuries after the collapse of the Achaemenian Empire could not be readily explained. There must have been a zealous minority that busied itself with defining what they considered the Prophet's true message to be; there must have been an 'orthodox' party within the 'Church'. This minority, concerned now with theology no less than with ritual, would be found among the Magi, and it is, in fact, to the Magi that Aristotle and other early Greek writers attribute the fully dualist doctrine of two independent principles – Oromasdes and Areimanios. Further, the founder of the Magian order was now said to be Zoroaster himself. The fall of the Achaemenian Empire, however, must have been disastrous for the Zoroastrian religion, and the fact that the Magi were able to retain as much as they did and restore it in a form that was not too strikingly different from the Prophet's original message after the lapse of some 600 years proves their devotion to his memory. It is, indeed, true to say that the Zoroastrian orthodoxy of the Sasanian period is nearer to the spirit of Zoroaster than is the thinly disguised polytheism of the Yashts.

Thus – according to Zaehner – while the direction that the Sasanians took was not altogether at odds with the spirit of the Gathas, the extreme dualism that accompanied a divinity that was remote and inaccessible made the faith less than attractive. Zurvanism was then truly heretical only in the sense that it weakened the appeal of Zoroastrianism.

Nonetheless, that Zurvanism was the predominant brand of Zoroastrianism during the cataclysmic years just prior to the fall of the empire, is, according to Duchesne-Guillemin, evident in the degree of influence that Zurvanism (but not Mazdaism) would have on the Iranian brand of Shi'a Islam. Writing in the historical present, he notes that "under Chosrau II (r. 590–628) and his successors, all kinds of superstitions tend to overwhelm the Mazdean religion, which gradually disintegrates, thus preparing the triumph of Islam." Thus, "what will survive in popular conscience under the Muslim varnish is not Mazdeism: it is Zervanite fatalism, well attested in Persian literature". This is also a thought expressed by Zaehner, who observes that Ferdowsi, in his Shahnameh, "expounds views which seem to be an epitome of popular Zervanite doctrine". Thus, according to Zaehner and Duchesne-Guillemin, Zurvanism's pessimistic fatalism was a formative influence on the Iranian psyche, paving the way (as it were) for the rapid adoption of Shi'a philosophy during the Safavid era.

According to Zaehner and Shaki, in Middle Persian texts of the 9th century, Dahri (from Arabic–Persian dahr, time, eternity) is the appellative term for adherents of the Zurvanite doctrine that the universe derived from Infinite Time. In later Persian and Arabic literature, the term would come to be a derogatory term for 'atheist' or 'materialist'. The term also appears – in conjunction with other terms for skeptics – in Denkard 3.225 and in the Skand-gumanig wizar where "one who says god is not, who are called dahari, and consider themselves to be delivered from religious discipline and the toil of performing meritorious deeds".

A surviving Zurvanist myth describes them as "both male and female" and the one "god of time" who existed before all other things and gave birth to Ahura Mazda and Angra Mainyu.

== See also ==
- List of Zoroastrianism sects
