= Arimanius =

Deity of darkness in Greek and Latin texts

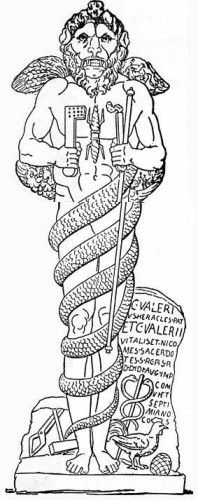
Drawing of the "leontocephaline figure" found at the mithraeum of C. Valerius Heracles and sons, dedicated 190 CE at Ostia Antica, Italy (CIMRM 312)

Arimanius (Greek: Αρειμάνιος Areimánios; Latin: Arīmanius) is a name for an obscure deity found in a few Greek literary texts and five Latin inscriptions. It is supposed to be the opponent of Oromazes (Ancient Greek: Ὡρομάζης Hōromázēs), the god of light. In classic texts, in the context of Zoroastrianism, Areimanios (with variations) fairly clearly refers to the Greeks' and Romans' interpretation of the Persian Ahriman. The Latin inscriptions which were found in a Mithraic context suggest a re-defined or different deity with a near-identical name.

The most extended passage in classical literature on Areimanios is in two sections of Plutarch who describes him as the dark or evil side in a dualistic opposition with Oromazes (for Ohrmuzd or Ahura Mazda). (Note: Areimanios is also mentioned in other texts as an evil daimon, "the worst spirit", or even equated with Satan as "the adversary": Diogenes Laërtius 1.8; Damascius, Dubitationes et Solutiones 125; Agathias, Historiae 2.25; Theodore of Mopsuestia apud Photius, Bibliotheca 72.81, cited by de Jong (1997).) However, Plutarch was specifically describing Persian Zoroastrianism, rather than the obscure Arimanius of the Mysteries of Mithras. In the context of Roman Mithraism, from the way the name is used, it seems implausible that it refers to an evil entity, no matter how formidable his depictions might appear.

== The name ==
The most common form of the name in its few occurrences among Greek authors is Ἀρειμανιος (Areimanios), presumably rendering an unattested Old Persian form *ahramanyu, which, however, would have yielded a Middle Persian *ahrmen. The name is given as Ἀριμάνης (Arimanēs) by Agathias, and Ἀρειμανής (Areimanēs) by Hesychius, rendering the Middle Persian Ahreman. Variations of the name not derivable by systematic linguistics may well be explained to its similarity to Greek words meaning "warlike" (see names and epithets of Ares).

== Plutarch ==
According to Plutarch Zoroaster named "Areimanios" as one of the two rivals who were the artificers of good and evil. In terms of sense perception, Oromazes was to be compared with light, and Areimanios to darkness and ignorance; between these was Mithras the Mediator. Areimanios received offerings that pertained to warding off evil and mourning.

In describing a ritual to Areimanios, Plutarch says the god was invoked as Hades gives the identification as Pluto, the name of the Greek ruler of the underworld used most commonly in texts and inscriptions pertaining to the mystery religions, and in Greek dramatists and philosophers of Athens in the Classical period. Turcan notes that Plutarch makes of Areimanios "a sort of tenebrous Pluto". Plutarch, however, names the Greek god as Hades, not the name Plouton used in the Eleusinian tradition (Note: For distinctions in usage between the two names, see Pluto in the mysteries and cult and Pluto in Greek literature and philosophy.) ("The Hidden One") and darkness. (Note: In Greek religion, Hades was the ruler of the dead or shades, but not an evil god per se, except in the sense that death might be considered a bad thing – κακόν, kakon.)

The Areimanios ritual required an otherwise-unknown plant that Plutarch calls "omomi" (Haoma or Soma), which was to be pounded in a mortar and mixed with the blood of a sacrificed wolf. The substance was then carried to a place "where the sun never shines" and cast therein. He adds that "water-rats" belong to this god, and therefore proficient rat-killers are fortunate men.

Plutarch then gives a cosmogonical myth:

Oromazes, born from the purest light, and Areimanius, born from darkness, are constantly at war with each other; and Oromazes created six gods, the first of Good Thought, the second of Truth, the third of Order, and, of the rest, one of Wisdom, one of Wealth, and one the Artificer of Pleasure in what is Honourable. But Areimanius created rivals, as it were, equal to these in number. Then Oromazes enlarged himself to thrice his former size, and removed himself as far distant from the Sun as the Sun is distant from the Earth, and adorned the heavens with stars. One star he set there before all others as a guardian and watchman, the Dog-star. Twenty-four other gods he created and placed in an egg. But those created by Areimanius, who were equal in number to the others, pierced through the egg and made their way inside; hence evils are now combined with good. But a destined time shall come when it is decreed that Areimanius, engaged in bringing on pestilence and famine, shall by these be utterly annihilated and shall disappear; and then shall the earth become a level plain, and there shall be one manner of life and one form of government for a blessed people who shall all speak one tongue. — Plutarch

Scholar Mary Boyce asserted that the passage shows a "fairly accurate" knowledge of basic Zoroastrianism.

In his Life of Themistocles, Plutarch has the Persian king invoke Areimanios by name, asking the god to cause the king's enemies to behave in such a way as to drive away their own best men; de Jong (1997) doubted that a Persian king would pray to his own national religion’s god of evil, particularly in public.

According to Plutarch, the king then made a sacrifice and got drunk – essentially a running gag on Persian kings in Plutarch’s writing, and thus dubious evidence for actual behavior.

== As a Mithraic god ==
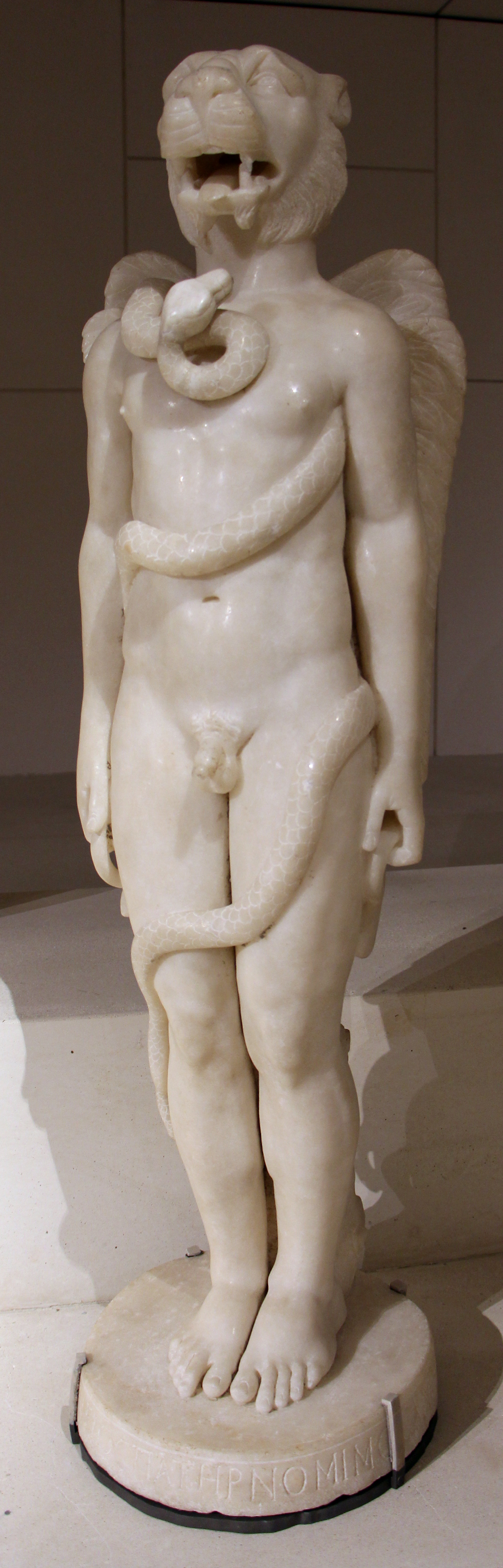
Lion-headed figure from the Sidon Mithraeum, sometimes identified as a Mithraic form of Arimanius (500 CE; CIMRM 78 & 79; Louvre)

Franz Cumont believed that Greco-Roman Mithraism had been influenced by some beliefs of ancient Mazdaism, including ethical dualism. However, no evidence has been found in any mithraeum for the "omomi" (haoma, soma) cult associated by Plutarch with the Persian Arimanios ritual.

Most scholars doubt that Mithraists actually preserved the doctrine of Persian magi, despite their appeals to their authority, but the name Arimanius is difficult to separate from the Persian tradition of Ahriman; nevertheless the association of Mithras with an ostensibly undefeated evil god has been dismissed by many scholars as inherently implausible.

However implausible the toleration of an evil god, the inscription Deo Areimanio (to the God Areimanius) is indeed found on a few altars to Mithras, but without any description that would link that name with a particular image. (Note: For instance, CIL III.3415, III.3480, VI.47 (without naming Mithras);) There are five high-quality dedications to Arimanius found throughout the Roman Empire, but none are on any of the many images of the Mithraic lion-headed figure. (Note: Gordon lists the dedications as CIMRM 322 (Ostia); 369 (Rome); 833 (York); 1773, 1775 (Carnuntum).) The text of the dedications suggest that in a Mithraic context Arimanius was not conceived of as an evil being, however formidable. Gordon remarks:

“the real point is surely that we know nothing of any importance about the western Areimanius.”

Occultist D.J. Cooper conjectures that the lion-headed figure does not depict a god, but rather symbolically represents the spiritual state achieved in the Leo degree – Mithraism’s “adept” level. If so, it would be yet another reason to un-link the name Arimanius from the lion-headed figure.

=== Roman Britain ===
A mutilated statue found at York has a fragmentary dedicatory inscription that has been read as containing the name Arimanius. The figure seems to be entwined with a serpent. At one time it was conjectured that it represented the lion-headed god of Mithraism, or some form of Aion. But since Arimanius could also be a Romano-Celtic personal name, it is uncertain whether the inscription refers to the god represented by the statue, or to the person who made the votive dedication. No other Mithraic objects were found near the statue, nor was its head; any leonine features are speculative.

== See also ==
- Aion
- Ares’ names and epithets
- Aryaman
- Ahriman
- Mithraism's lion-headed figure
- Zoroastrianism
