= Imamzadeh Mahruq =

Burial of Mohammad Mahruqh in Nishapur, Iran

Emamzadeh Mahruq
- امامزاده محروق
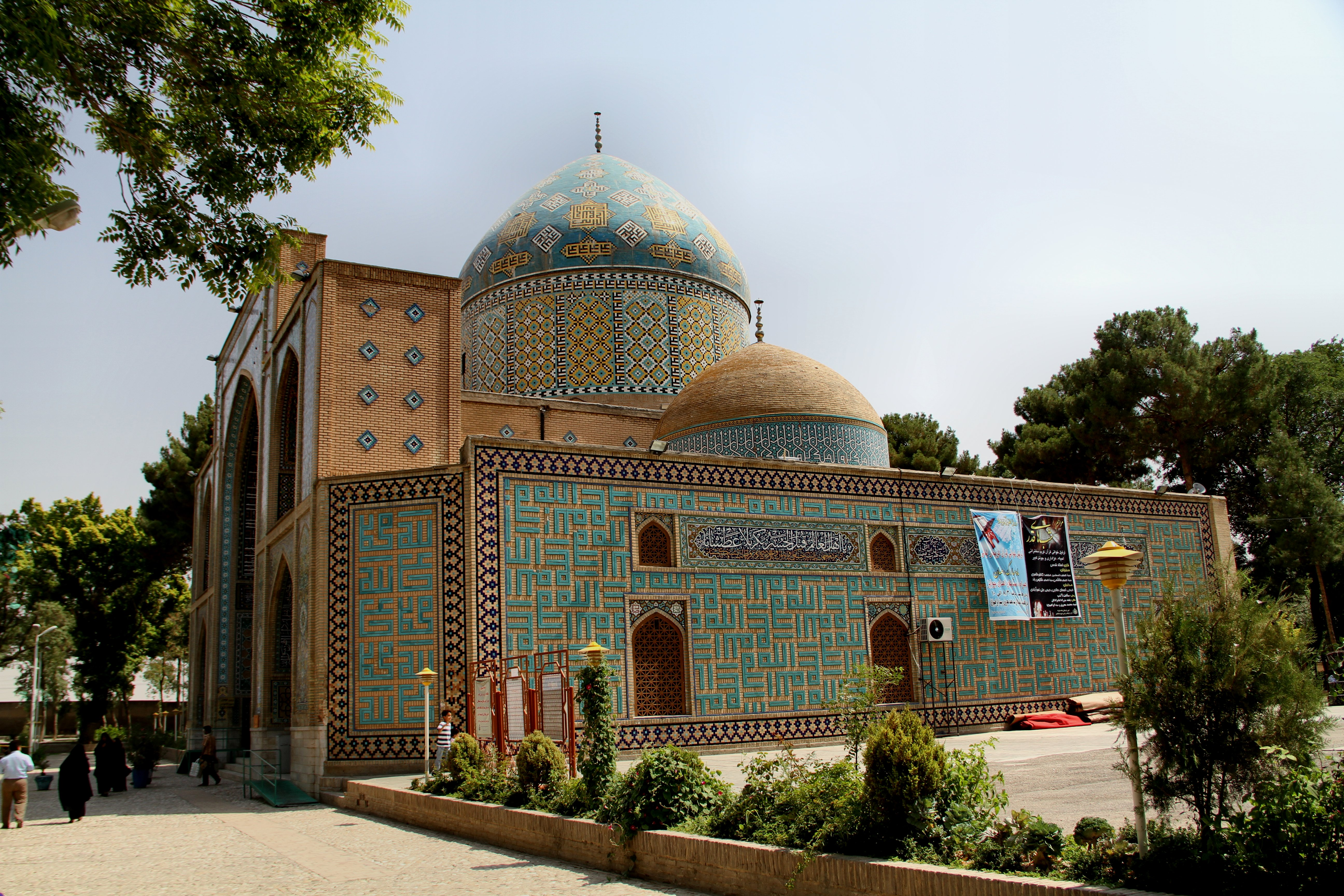
- Mosque and the resting place of Immamzadeh Mahruq and Ibrahim

General information
- Status: Open to the public
- Type: Shia pilgrimage and mosque
- Architectural style: Persian architecture
- Location: Nishapur, Razavi Khorasan province, Iran
- Coordinates: 36.165°N 58.821°E

Other information
- Parking: Available
- Public transit: Available

Website
- neyshabur.ir

Iran National Heritage List
- Official name: Emamzadeh Mohammad Mahruq
- Type: Emamzadeh
- Designated: 1937
- Reference no.: 302
- Conservation organization: Cultural Heritage, Handicrafts and Tourism Organization of Iran

Immamzadeh Mahruq (Persian: امامزاده محروق) is an Immamzadeh/mosque and the resting place of Imamzadeh Muhammad Mahruq ibn Muhammad ibn Zayd ibn Ali and Imamzadeh Ibrahim ibn Ahmad ibn Musa al-Kazim situated in Omar Khayyam and Immamzadeh Mohammad Mahruq Garden in Nishapur, Khorasan Province, northeastern Iran. According to Iranarchpedia the building and the mosque of the Immamzadeh date back to the Timurid and the Safavid eras. This mosque is now registered as part of the Iranian national heritage list with the registration number of 302. Throughout history, this mosque has been redecorated and reconstructed several times.

The current mosque was initially built by the order of Amir Kamal-ol Din during the reign of Sultan Husayn Bayqara. Later and during the Qajar era, this mosque was reconstructed by one of the sons of Fath-Ali Shah Qajar, named Farrokhseyr Mirza 'Nayer od-Doleh'.

In the 20th century, The brickwork of this building was reconstructed and redecorated by Mohammad Hossein Akhavian, a Persian artisan specialized in brickwork who died on January 11, 2020.

== Gallery ==
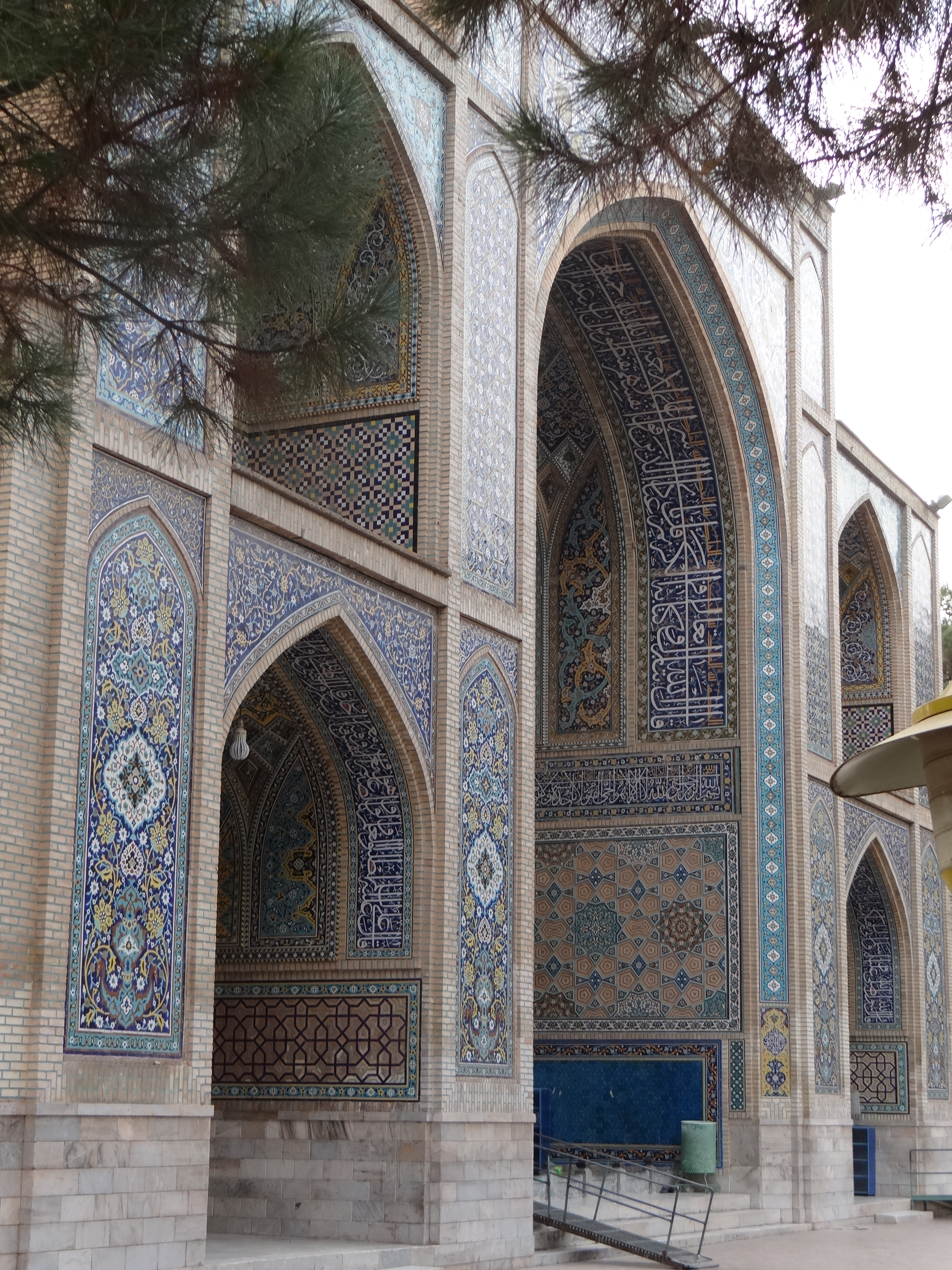

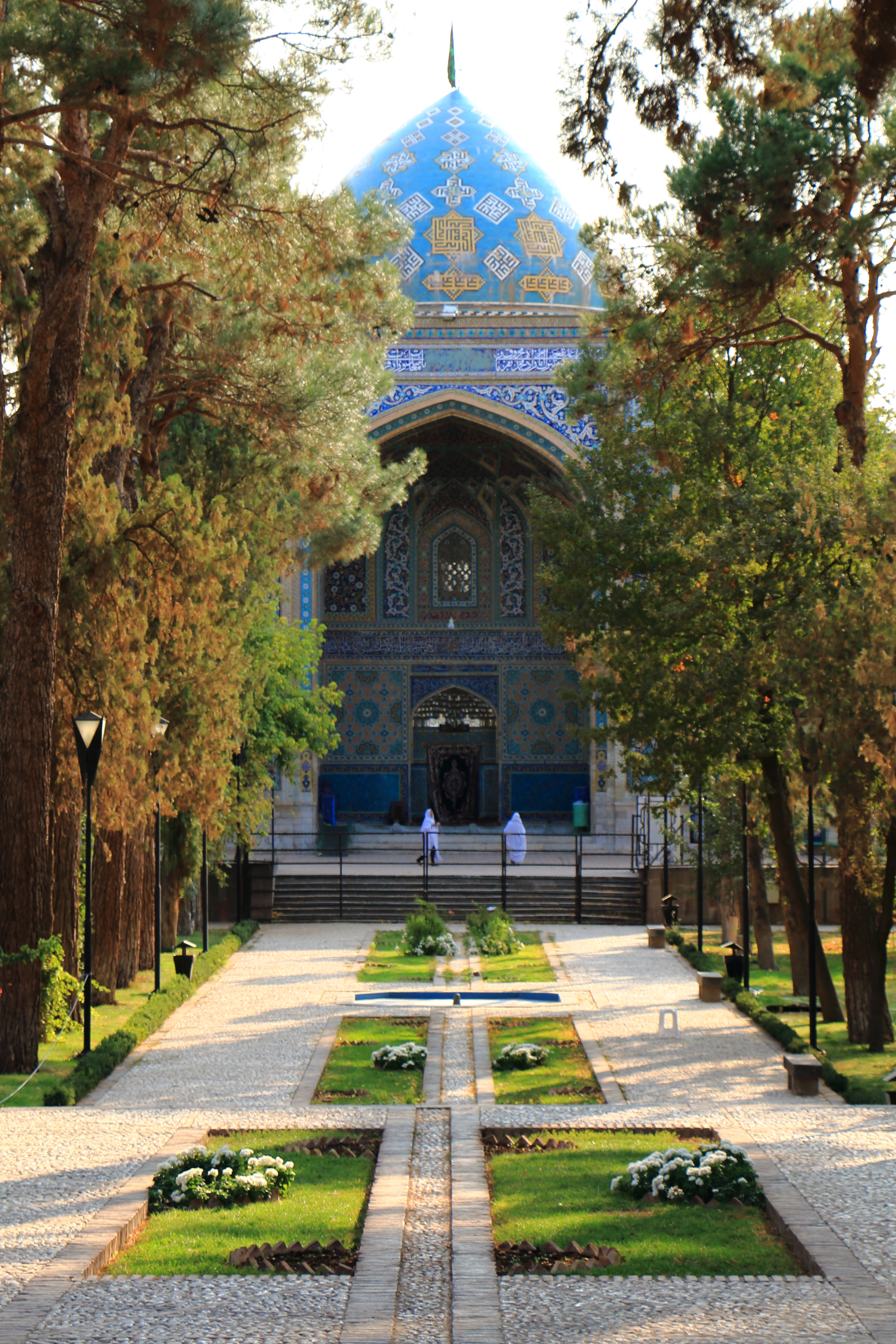

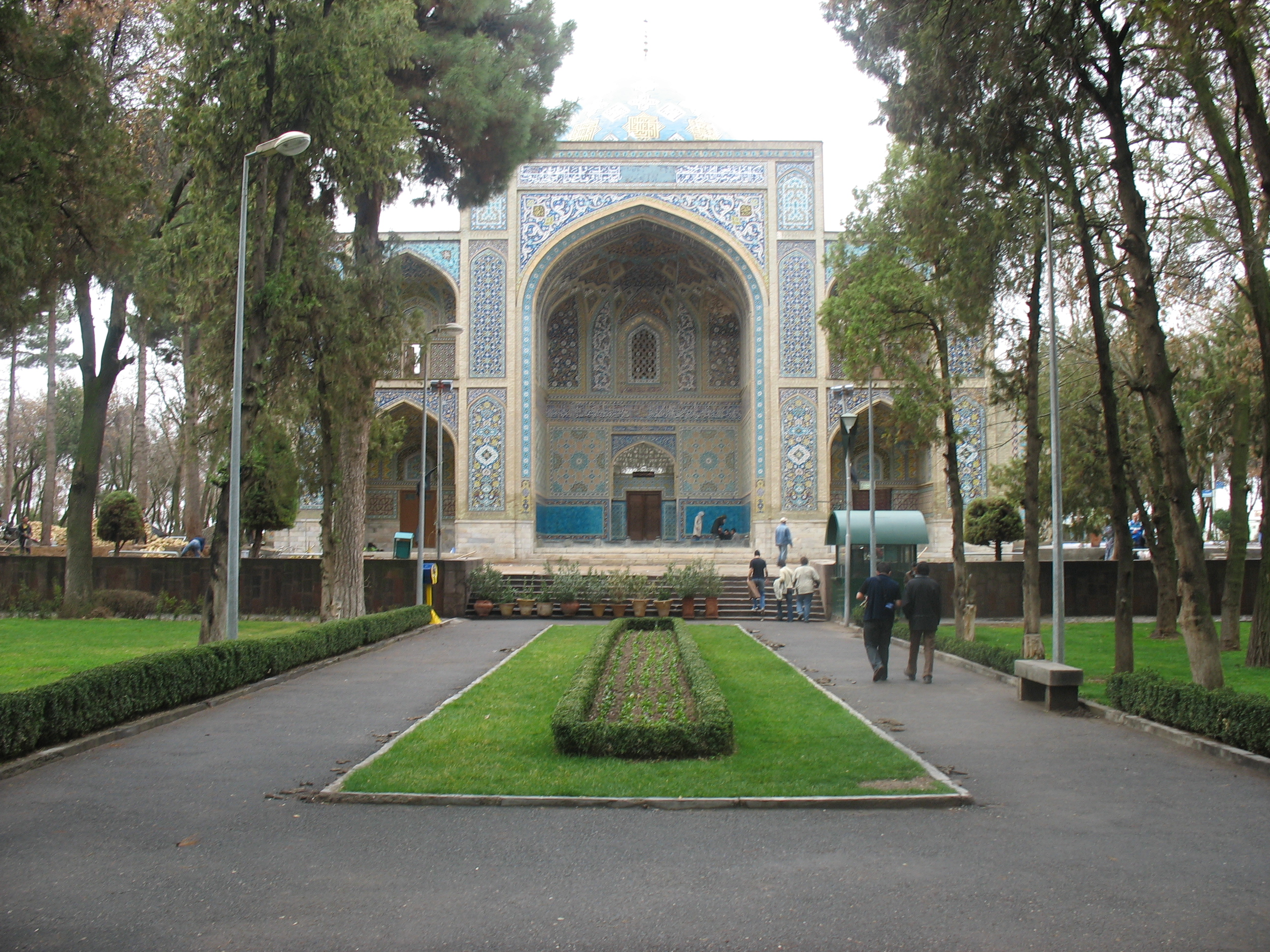

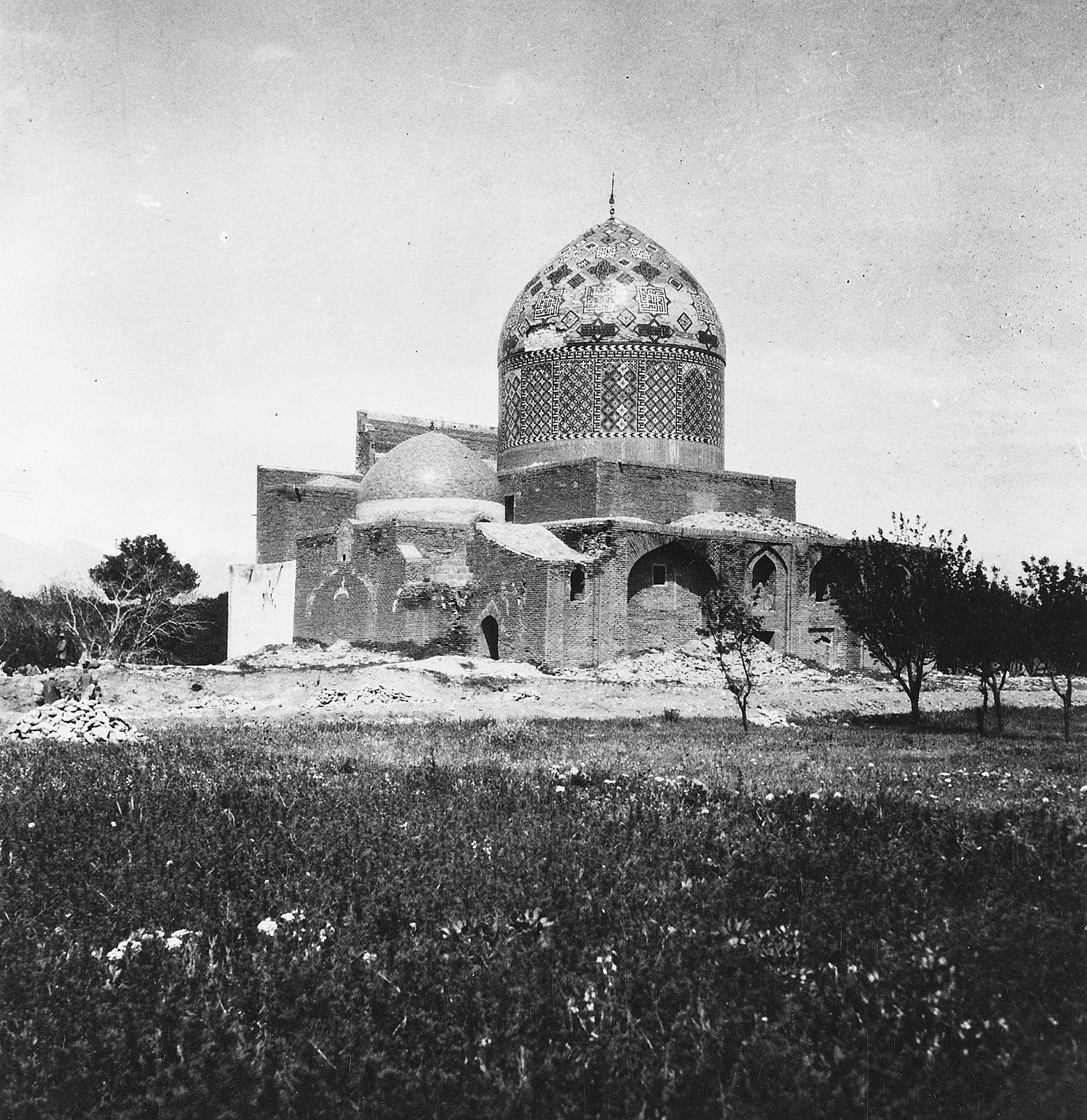

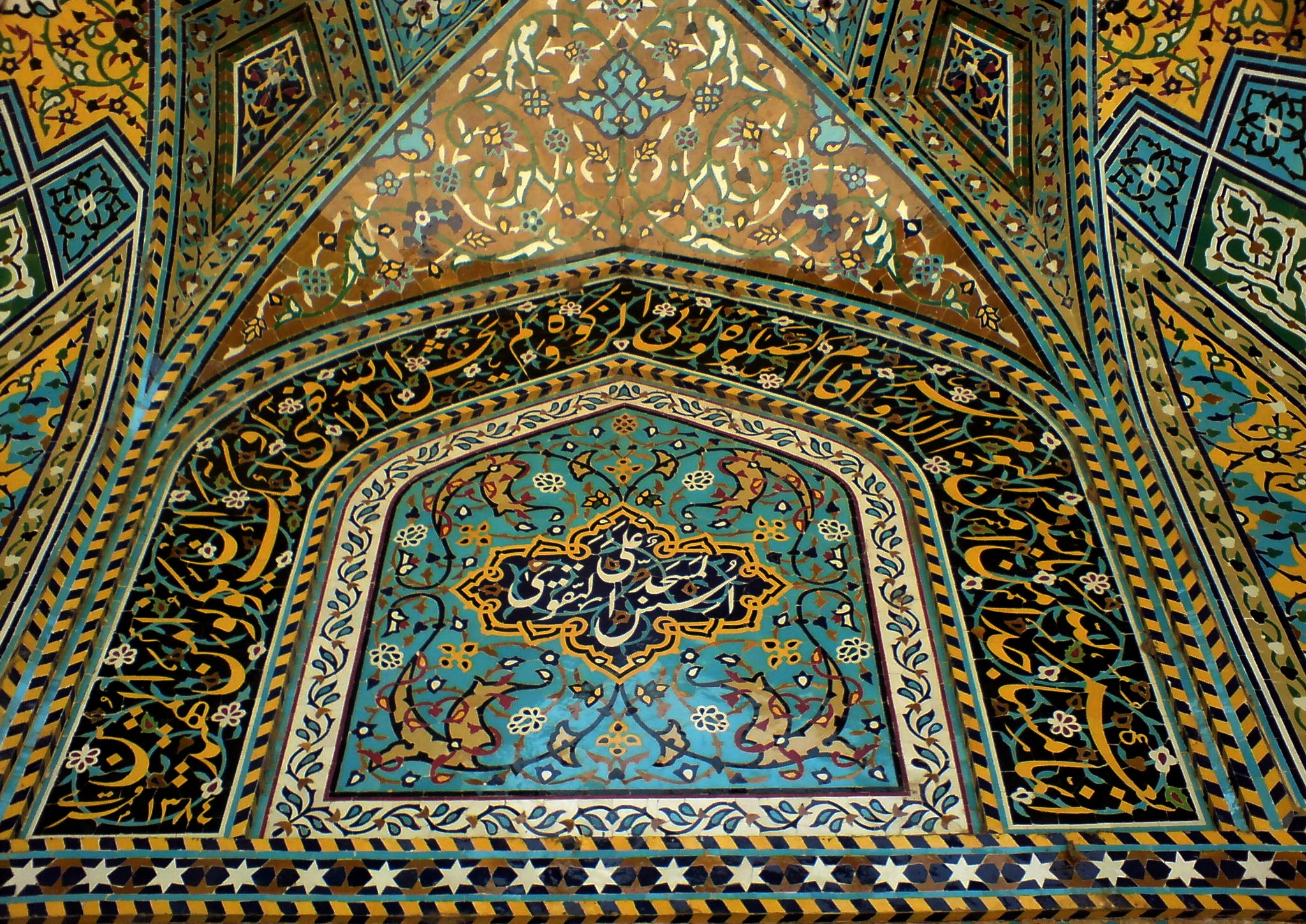

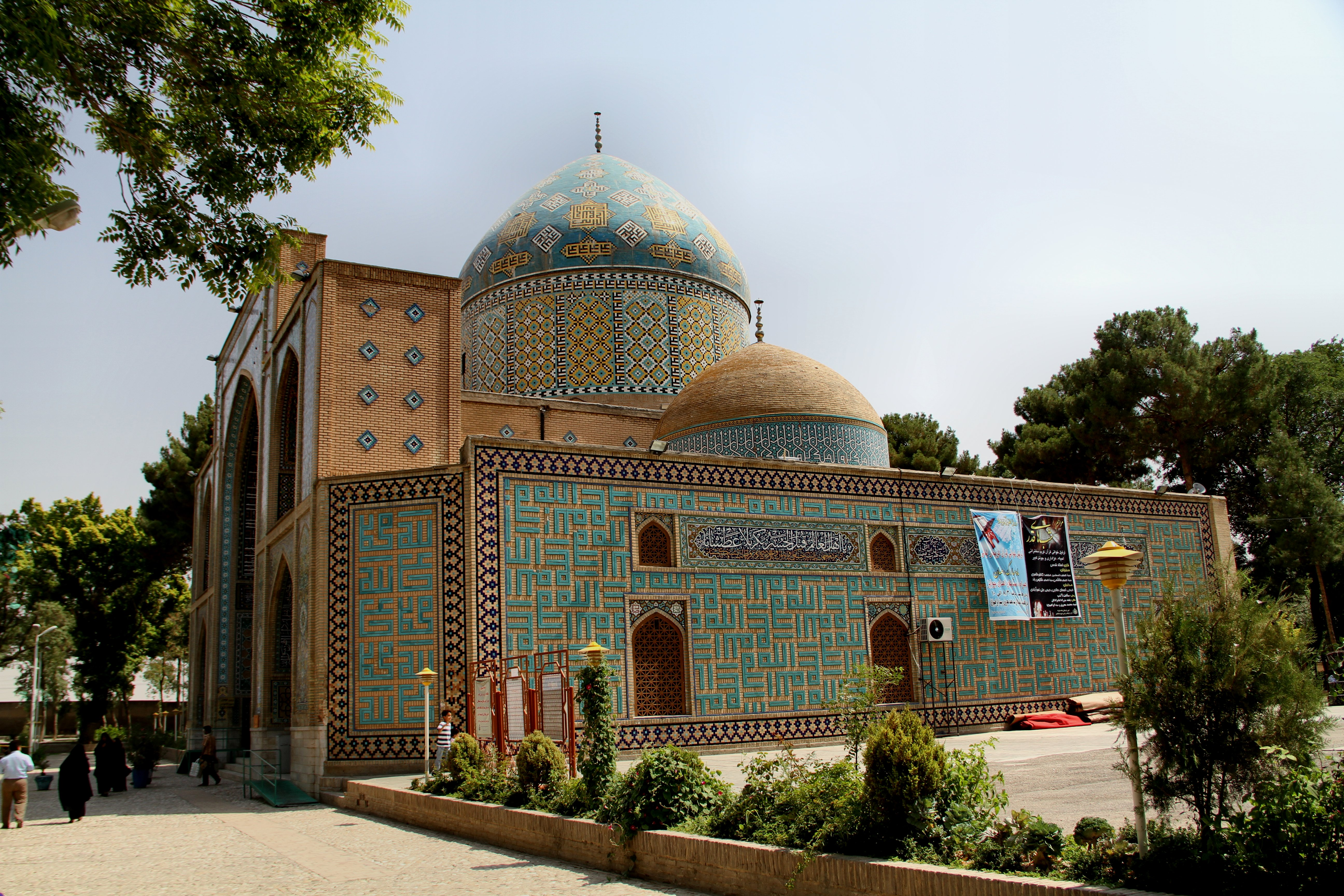
