= Djahi =

Djahi may refer to:

- Djahi (region), an Egyptian name for the Syrian region
- Djahi (Zoroastrianism), a demoness
