= Capital punishment in Zoroastrianism =

Capital punishment in Zoroastrianism It is found in the Zoroastrian holy book, the Avesta, and in several other Zoroastrian texts, and was practiced during the Sasanian era.

== Execution in the Avesta ==
In the Venidad section, a section of the penal code, the word "margarzan" is used, meaning mortal sin. It specifies the prohibitions that lead to the death penalty: carrying a corpse alone, offering extremely hot food to a dog so that its throat burns, and offering bones to a dog (this is a punishment because Zoroastrianism venerates dogs. The death penalty is for anyone who throws a corpse into a waterway. Anyone who insults a judge is considered a rebel against the king and deserves death. Eating a human or dog corpse is also punishable by death.

== Reasons for execution ==
In Zoroastrianism, abandoning the faith is considered a capital offense. In the Vendidad section, at the beginning of chapter 15, the text lists the greatest sins a Zoroastrian might commit, the first of which is spreading a non-Zoroastrian faith among Zoroastrians. The punishment for this act is two hundred beheadings. Other grounds for execution include practicing magic and armed robbery.

Zoroastrianism has been said to have a "hatred of male anal intercourse" that is reflected in at least one mythological tale. When Ahriman, the "Spirit of Aridity and Death" and "Lord of Lies", sought to destroy the world, he engaged in self-sodomy. That caused an "explosion of evil power" and resulted in the birth of a host of evil minions.

Unlike other crimes, the killing of a homosexual does not require authorization from the priesthood; instead, the individual is killed immediately upon discovery, specifically by beheading.
