= Jahi =

Avestan language name of Zoroastrianism's demoness of "lasciviousness."

Jahi is the Avestan language name of Zoroastrianism's demoness of "lasciviousness." As a hypostatic entity, Jahi is variously interpreted as "hussy," "rake," "libertine," "courtesan" and "one who leads a licentious life." Her standard epithet is "the Whore."

In Zoroastrian tradition she is characterized as the consort of Ahriman and the cause of the menstrual cycle. (Note: Menstruation itself is however characterized as being a creation of Angra Mainyu/Ahriman.)

== In the Avesta ==
In the hymn to Haoma, the devotee rejects the temptations of the "polluting whore" who "sits down devouring Haoma's sacrificial offering". In the hymn to Asha, the Holy term (manthra spenta) is an effective remedy against Jahi and other noxious creatures. In the hymn to Ashi (not to be confused with Asha), "Fortune" wails about how shamed she is by Jahi's improper actions.

Jahi is characterized in the Vendidad as causing Ahura Mazda "the most grief". "Her gaze takes the colors away from a third of [world]". (Note: In this verse, the earth (typically Zam) is identified as Spenta Armaiti, the Amesha Spenta of the earth.) It also contains an oblique reference to Jahi's cosmological role as the killer of Gav-aevo.data (MP: Gawi ewdad), the primordial creature from whose seed all animal creation originates.

In the Sudgar nask (Note: The Sudgar Nask is an Avestan text that has not survived but the contents of which are summarized in Denkard 9.) fire is sickened by the stench and filth of Jahi and by the irritant "owing to the hussy who, dropping her knee on to the fire-stand, arranged her curls; the falling of damp and moisture from her head, with the hair and filth therefrom".

== In tradition ==
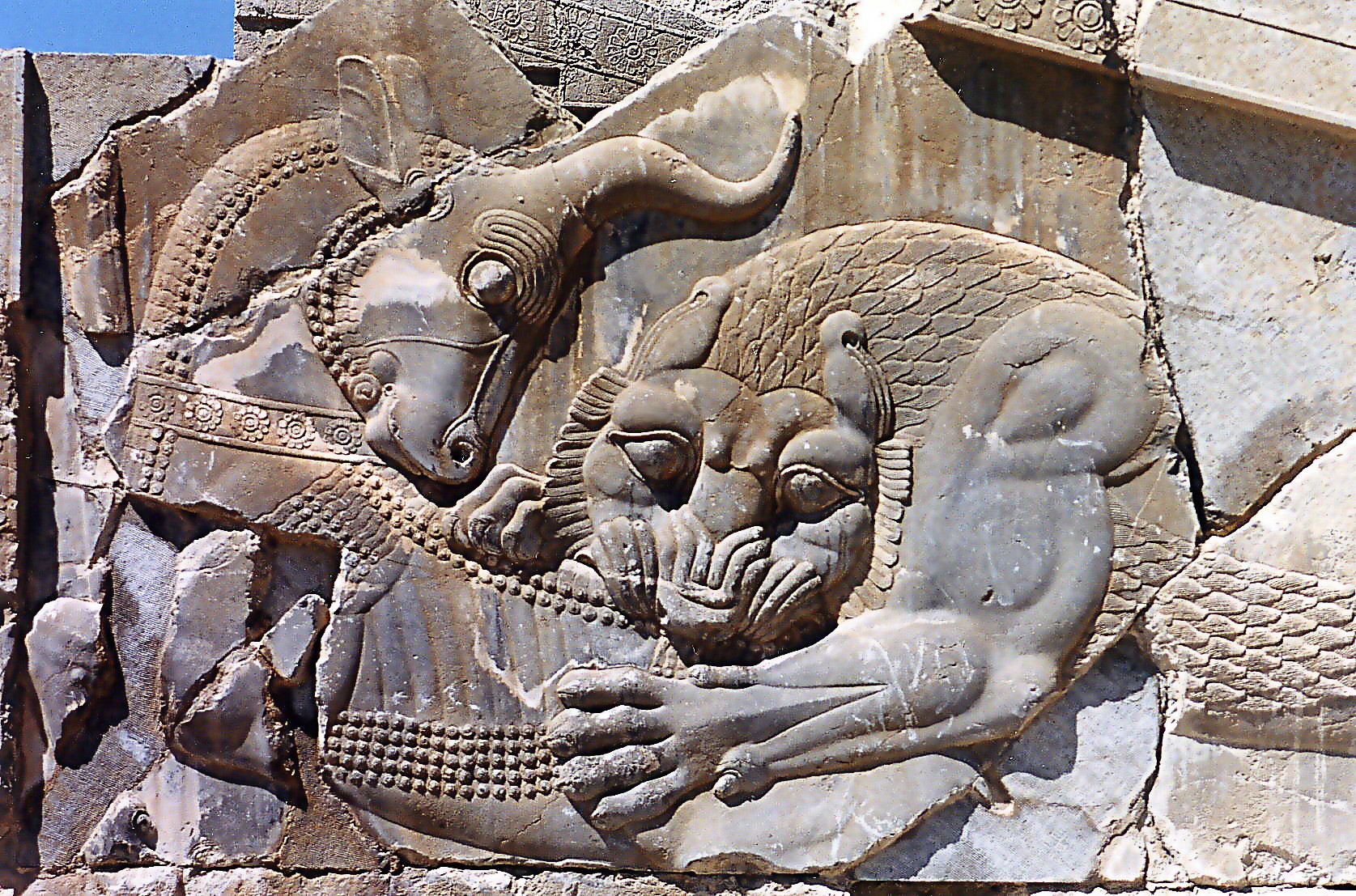
Persepolis mural: The death of Gav-aēvō.dātā/Gawiewdad, the primordial bovine.

In the Bundahishn, a Zoroastrian account of creation finished in the 11th or 12th century CE, Ohrmazd and Ahriman already co-exist at the beginning of time, but Ahriman is not immediately aware of Ohrmazd. During the first 3000 years (the first cosmic age), Ahriman espied the light of Ormuzd but "seeing valor and supremacy superior to his own, he fled back to the darkness and fashioned many demons — a creation destructive and ready for battle". Ohrmazd, being omniscient, knows of the inevitability of the attack and creates fire (Adur) "with his thought", with which the universe would subsequently be suffused with goodness (life). Upon being attacked, Ohrmazd recites the Ahunawar invocation, thus revealing His ultimate victory to Ahriman, who then falls back confounded for another 3000 years.

Towards the end of the second cosmic age (the second 3000 years), Ahriman, who until then has resisted the exhortations of his demons, is roused from his impotence by Jahi's beguiling devices, who promises to destroy the creatures of Ohrmazd. Incited, Ahriman defiles her with a kiss, (Note: The 'kiss' in Bundahishn 3 is frequently considered to be a euphemism for sexual union.) and from this act Jahi is thenceforth afflicted with menstruation.

Jahi is appointed by Ahriman for the defilement of females, and it is this defilement that causes women to have their menses. Jahi's gaze is said to be powerful enough to kill.

== Bibliography ==
- Zaehner, Richard Charles (1955). Zurvan: A Zoroastrian dilemma. Oxford: Clarendon. pp. 350–351.
- Dhalla, Maneckji Nusservanji (1938). History of Zoroastrianism. New York: OUP. p. 405.
- Shaki, Mansour. "Gayōmart". Archived copy. Encyclopedia Iranica. Vol. 10. Costa Mesa: Mazda. Archived from the original on 2005-01-26.
- Max Müller, ed. (1897). "Bundahishn". Pahlavi Texts. Sacred Books of the East. Vol. 5. Translated by Edward William West. Oxford: Clarendon.
- Max Müller, ed. (1897). "Selections of Zadspram". Sacred Books of the East. Vol. 5. Translated by Edward William West. Oxford: Clarendon.
- Behramgore Tehmuras Anklesaria, trans., ed. (1956). Zand-Akasih: Iranian or Greater Bundahishn. Bombay: Rahnumae Mazdayasnan Sabha.
