= Ahriman =

Personification of the "destructive spirit" in Zoroastrianism

Angra Mainyu
- Spirit of evil, chaos, destruction, daevas
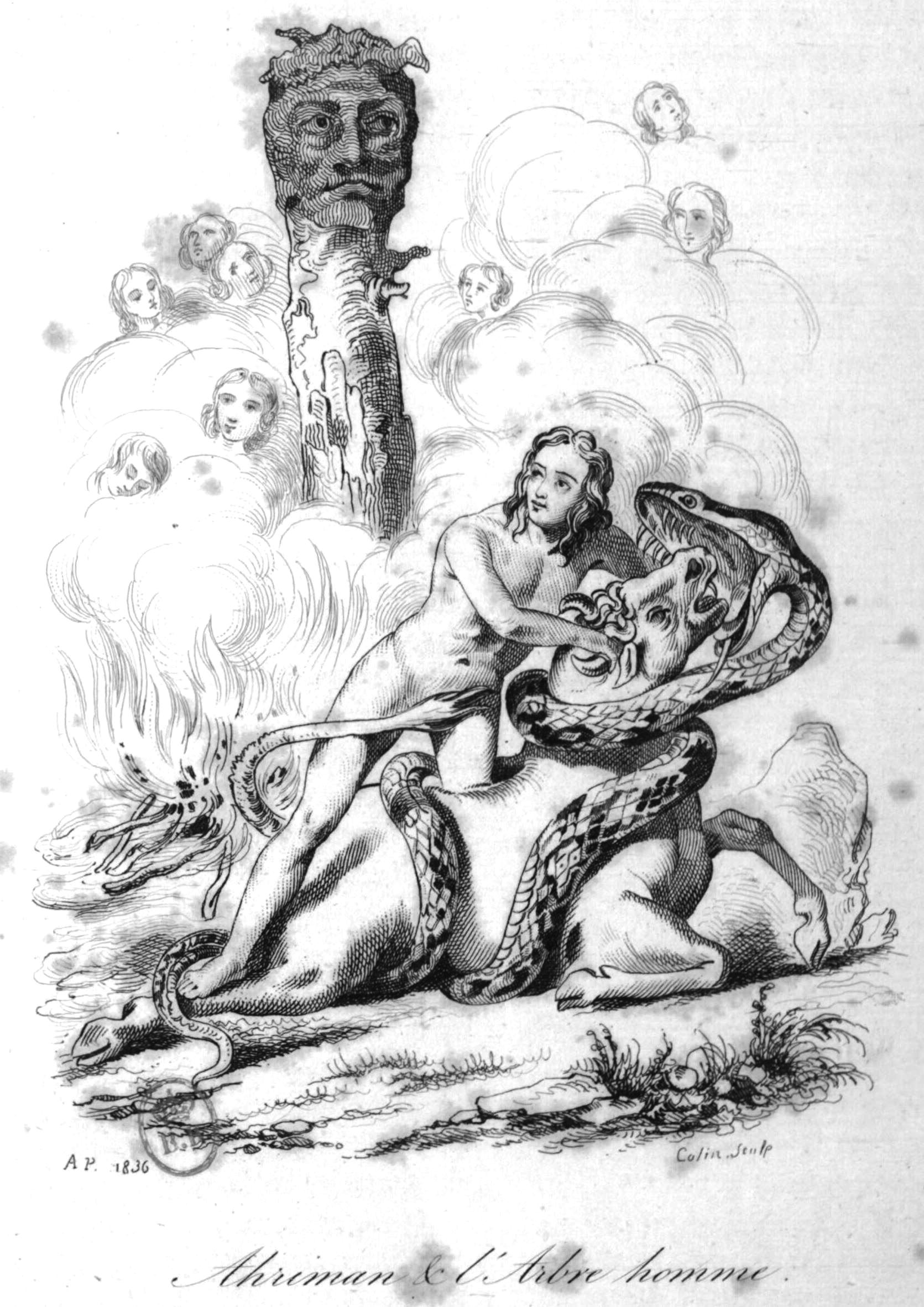
- Ahriman (in the guise of a serpent) attacking the primordial bull, from which Keyumars (the first man) emerges, with the "Human Tree" in the background; engraved by Colin from "Mythologie pittoresque" (1836).
- Other names: Ahriman
- Avestan: 𐬀𐬢𐬭𐬀 𐬨𐬀𐬌𐬥𐬌𐬌𐬎
- Affiliation: Zoroastrianism, Zurvanism
- Adherents: Daevas
- Region: Greater Iran

Genealogy
- Parents: Zurvan (In Zurvanism only)
- Siblings: Ahura Mazda (In Zurvanism only), Spenta Mainyu (Twin brother in orthodox Zoroastrianism)
- Consort: Wadag
- Offspring: Zahhak, Divs

Equivalents
- Roman: Arimanius
- Abrahamic: Satan
- Buddhist: Mara
- Canaanite: Mot
- Islamic: Iblis
- Gnostic: Demiurge / Yaldabaoth

In Zoroastrianism, Ahriman (/ˈɑːrɪmən/; Middle Persian: 𐭠𐭧𐭫𐭬𐭭𐭩, romanized: Ahreman), (Note: Persian: اهریمن, romanized: Ahriman) also written Ahreman or as Ahrimanes, (Note: For example: That the old Zoroastrian could daily say, "May Ahura Mazda increase ! Broken be the power of Ahrimanes!" is no small evidence how far on the right way his faith had led him.) is the destructive evil spirit who functions as the main adversary either of the Spenta Mainyu or directly of Ahura Mazda, the highest Zoroastrian deity. His Avestan name is Angra Mainyu (/ˈæŋrə ˈmaɪnjuː/; Avestan: 𐬀𐬢𐬭𐬀 𐬨𐬀𐬌𐬥𐬌𐬌𐬎, romanized: Aŋra Ma^{i}niiu).

== In the Avesta ==
=== In Zoroaster's revelation ===
Avestan angra mainyu "seems to have been an original conception of Zoroaster's." In the Gathas, which are the oldest texts of Zoroastrianism and are attributed to Zoroaster, angra mainyu is not yet a proper name. (Note: Proper names are altogether rare in the Gathas. In these texts, even Ahura Mazda and Amesha Spenta are not yet proper names.) In the one instance in these hymns where the two words appear together, the concept spoken of is that of a mainyu ("mind", "spirit" or otherwise an abstract energy etc.) (Note: The translation of mainyu as "spirit" is the common approximation. The stem of mainyu is "man", "thought", and "spirit" is here meant in the sense of "mind".) that is angra ("destructive", "chaotic", "disorderly", "inhibitive", "malign" etc., of which a manifestation can be anger). In this single instance – in Yasna 45.2 – the "more bounteous of the spirits twain" declares angra mainyu to be its "absolute antithesis".

A similar statement occurs in Yasna 30.3, where the antithesis is however aka mainyu, aka being the Avestan language word for "evil". Hence, aka mainyu is the "evil spirit" or "evil mind" or "evil thought," as contrasted with spenta mainyu, the "bounteous spirit" with which Ahura Mazda conceived of creation, which then "was".

The aka mainyu epithet recurs in Yasna 32.5, when the principle is identified with the daevas that deceive humankind and themselves. While in later Zoroastrianism, the daevas are demons, this is not yet evident in the Gathas: Zoroaster stated that the daevas are "wrong gods" or "false gods" that are to be rejected, but they are not yet demons. Some have also proposed a connection between Angra Mainyu and the sage Angiras of the Rigveda. If this is true, it could be understood as evidence for a religious schism between the deva-worshiping Vedic Indo-Aryans and early Zoroastrians.

In Yasna 32.3, these daevas are identified as the offspring, not of Angra Mainyu, but of akem manah, "evil thinking". A few verses earlier it is however the daebaaman, "deceiver" – not otherwise identified but "probably Angra Mainyu" – who induces the daevas to choose achistem manah – "worst thinking." In Yasna 32.13, the abode of the wicked is not the abode of Angra Mainyu, but the abode of the same "worst thinking". "One would have expected [Angra Mainyu] to reign in hell, since he had created 'death and how, at the end, the worst existence shall be for the deceitful' (Y. 30.4)."

=== In the Younger Avesta ===
Yasna 19.15 recalls that Ahura Mazda's recital of the Ahuna Vairya invocation puts Angra Mainyu in a stupor. In Yasna 9.8, Angra Mainyu creates Aži Dahaka, but the serpent recoils at the sight of Mithra's mace (Yasht 10.97, 10.134). In Yasht 13, the Fravashis defuse Angra Mainyu's plans to dry up the earth, and in Yasht 8.44 Angra Mainyu battles but cannot defeat Tishtrya and so prevent the rains. In Vendidad 19, Angra Mainyu urges Zoroaster to turn from the good religion by promising him sovereignty of the world. On being rejected, Angra Mainyu assails Zoroaster with legions of demons, but Zoroaster deflects them all. In Yasht 19.96, a verse that reflects a Gathic injunction, Angra Mainyu will be vanquished and Ahura Mazda will ultimately prevail.

In Yasht 19.46ff, Angra Mainyu and Spenta Mainyu battle for possession of khvaraenah, "divine glory" or "fortune". In some verses of the Yasna (e.g. Yasna 57.17), the two principles are said to have created the world, which seems to contradict the Gathic principle that declares Ahura Mazda to be the sole creator and which is reiterated in the cosmogony of Vendidad 1. In that first chapter, which is the basis for the 9th–12th-century Bundahishn, the creation of sixteen lands by Ahura Mazda is countered by the Angra Mainyu's creation of sixteen scourges such as winter, sickness, and vice. "This shift in the position of Ahura Mazda, his total assimilation to this Bounteous Spirit [Mazda's instrument of creation], must have taken place in the 4th century BC at the latest; for it is reflected in Aristotle's testimony, which confronts Areimanios with Oromazdes (apud Diogenes Laertius, 1.2.6)."

Yasht 15.43 assigns Angra Mainyu to the nether world, a world of darkness. So also Vendidad 19.47, but other passages in the same chapter (19.1 and 19.44) have him dwelling in the region of the daevas, which the Vendidad asserts is in the north. There (19.1, 19.43–44), Angra Mainyu is the daevanam daevo, "daeva of daevas" or chief of the daevas. The superlative daevo.taema is however assigned to the demon Paitisha ("opponent"). In an enumeration of the daevas in Vendidad 1.43, Angra Mainyu appears first and Paitisha appears last. "Nowhere is Angra Mainyu said to be the creator of the daevas or their father."

== In Zurvanite Zoroastrianism ==
Zurvanism – a historical branch of Zoroastrianism that sought to theologically resolve a dilemma found in a mention of antithetical "twin spirits" in Yasna 30.3 – developed a notion that Ahura Mazda (MP: Ohrmuzd) and Angra Mainyu (MP: Ahriman) were twin brothers, with the former being the epitome of good and the latter being the epitome of evil. This mythology of twin brotherhood is only explicitly attested in the post-Sassanid Syriac and Armenian polemic such as that of Eznik of Kolb. According to these sources the genesis saw Zurvan as an androgynous deity, existing alone but desiring offspring who would create "heaven and hell and everything in between." Zurvan then sacrificed for a thousand years. Towards the end of this period, Zurvan began to doubt the efficacy of sacrifice and in the moment of this doubt Ohrmuzd and Ahriman were conceived: Ohrmuzd for the sacrifice and Ahriman for the doubt. Upon realizing that twins were to be born, Zurvan resolved to grant the first-born sovereignty over creation. Ohrmuzd perceived Zurvan's decision, which he then communicated to his brother. Ahriman then preempted Ohrmuzd by ripping open the womb to emerge first. Reminded of the resolution to grant Ahriman sovereignty, Zurvan conceded, but limited kingship to a period of 9000 years, after which Ohrmuzd would rule for all eternity. Eznik of Kolb also summarizes a myth in which Ahriman is said to have demonstrated an ability to create life by creating the peacock.

The story of Ahriman's ripping open the womb to emerge first suggests that Zurvanite ideology perceived Ahriman to be evil by choice, rather than always having been intrinsically evil (as found, for example, in the cosmological myths of the Bundahishn). And the story of Ahriman's creation of the peacock suggests that Zurvanite ideology perceived Ahriman to be a creator figure like Ormazd. This is significantly different from what is found in the Avesta (where Mazda's stock epithet is dadvah, "Creator", implying Mazda is the Creator), as well as in Zoroastrian tradition where creation of life continues to be exclusively Mazda's domain, and where creation is said to have been good until it was corrupted by Ahriman and the daevas.

In some Zurvanite narratives, it is mentioned that Zurvan had a wife and had children with Ahura Mazda and Ahriman, later, Ahura Mazda married his mother and had children with her, including the sun, dogs, pigs, donkeys, and cattle.

== In Zoroastrian tradition ==
In the Pahlavi texts of the 9th–12th century, Ahriman (written ʼhl(y)mn) is frequently written upside down "as a sign of contempt and disgust."

In the Book of Arda Viraf 5.10, the narrator – the 'righteous Viraf' – is taken by Sarosh and Adar to see "the reality of God and the archangels, and the non-reality of Ahriman and the demons" as described by the German philologist and orientalist Martin Haug, whose radical interpretation was to change the faith in the 19th century (see "In present-day Zoroastrianism" below). This idea of "non-reality" is also expressed in other texts, such as the Denkard, a 9th-century "encyclopedia of Mazdaism", which states Ahriman "has never been and never will be." In chapter 100 of Book of the Arda Viraf, which is titled 'Ahriman', the narrator sees the "Evil spirit, ... whose religion is evil [and] who ever ridiculed and mocked the wicked in hell."

In the Zurvanite Ulema-i Islam (a Zoroastrian text, despite the title), "Ahriman also is called by some name by some people and they ascribe evil unto him but nothing can also be done by him without Time." A few chapters later, the Ulema notes that "it is clear that Ahriman is a non-entity" but "at the resurrection Ahriman will be destroyed and thereafter all will be good; and [change?] will proceed through the will of God." In the Sad Dar, the world is described as having been created by Ohrmuzd and become pure through his truth. But Ahriman, "being devoid of anything good, does not issue from that which is owing to truth." (62.2)

Book of Jamaspi 2.3 notes that "Ahriman, like a worm, is so much associated with darkness and old age, that he perishes in the end." Chapter 4.3 recalls the grotesque legend of Tahmurasp (Avestan: Taxma Urupi) riding Angra Mainyu for thirty years (cf. Yasht 15.12, 19.29) and so preventing him from doing evil. In chapter 7, Jamasp explains that the Indians declare Ahriman will die, but "those, who are not of good religion, go to hell."

The Bundahishn, a Zoroastrian account of creation completed in the 12th century has much to say about Ahriman and his role in the cosmogony. In chapter 1.23, following the recitation of the Ahuna Vairya, Ohrmuzd takes advantage of Ahriman's incapacity to create life without intervention. When Ahriman recovers, he creates Jeh, the primal seductress who afflicts women with their menstrual cycles. In Bundahishn 4.12, Ahriman perceives that Ohrmuzd is superior to himself, and so flees to fashion his many demons with which to conquer the universe in battle. The entire universe is finally divided between the Ohrmuzd and the yazads on one side and Ahriman with his devs on the other. Ahriman slays the primal bull, but the moon rescues the seed of the dying creature, and from it springs all animal creation. But the battle goes on, with mankind caught in the middle, whose duty it remains to withstand the forces of evil through good thoughts, words and deeds.

Other texts see the world created by Ohrmuzd as a trap for Ahriman, who is then distracted by creation and expends his force in a battle he cannot win. (The epistles of Zatspram 3.23; Shkand Gumanig Vichar 4.63–4.79). The Dadistan denig explains that Ohrmuzd, being omniscient, knew of Ahriman's intent, but it would have been against his "justice and goodness to punish Ahriman before he wrought evil [and] this is why the world is created."

Ahriman has no such omniscience, a fact of which Ohrmuzd reminds him (Bundahishn 1.16). In contrast, in Manichaean scripture, Mani ascribes foresight to Ahriman.

Some Zoroastrians believed Ahriman "created dangerous storms, plagues, and monsters during the struggle with Ahura Mazda" and that the two gods were twins.

== Ahriman as a Malevolent Spirit and Not a Deity ==
In academic discourse, comparative religion, and contemporary Zoroastrian studies, Ahriman (the Middle Persian equivalent of the Avestan Angra Mainyu) is fundamentally defined as a cosmic, malevolent spirit rather than a co-equal deity or a god of evil. While late antique interpretations drifted toward cosmic dualism, critical exegesis of the earliest Zoroastrian texts—specifically the Gathas—demonstrates that Ahriman was never conceptualized as a divine entity possessing inherent godhood. Instead, he represents the hypostasis of destructive mentality, moral error, and cosmic negation, existing in absolute opposition to the monotheistic creator god, Ahura Mazda.

=== Ontological Nature as a Spirit in the Gathas ===
The earliest layer of Zoroastrian literature, the Gathas (hymns composed by the prophet Zoroaster), establishes a strict monotheistic framework wherein Ahura Mazda is the sole supreme architect and uncreated creator of the cosmos. Within these texts, Ahriman is referred to as Angra Mainyu (Avestan: 𐬀𐬢𐬭𐬀 𐬨𐬀𐬌𐬥𐬌𐬭𐬎), a term translating literally to "destructive spirit," "malignant mentality," or "the angry/evil mind".

The Principle of Free Will and the Twin Spirits: In Yasna 30.3, Zoroaster introduces the doctrine of the two primordial tendencies or spirits (Mainyu), which exist as twins representing antithetical choices: Spenta Mainyu (the bounteous, constructive spirit) and Angra Mainyu (the destructive spirit). Crucially, Angra Mainyu was not created evil by nature; rather, he became the archetype of evil by exercising his fundamental free will to choose Druj (the Lie, deceit, and chaos) over Asha (truth, righteousness, and cosmic order).

Absence of True Creative Power: Unlike Ahura Mazda, who possesses absolute generative capabilities (Dātār), Angra Mainyu possesses no capacity for authentic creation. His metaphysical output is restricted to akem mano (evil thinking) and counter-creation (Middle Persian wihesgārīh). He does not bring substantive reality into being, but rather corrupts, misaligns, and introduces parasitical elements—such as death, disease, pests, and moral decay—into the pristine material creation (getig) of Ahura Mazda.

=== The Sasanian Period: Cosmic Counterpart Without Divinity ===
During the Sasanian Empire (224–651 CE), the theological codification of Zoroastrianism via Pahlavi literatures (such as the Bundahishn and Denkard) adopted a rigid, dualistic cosmological model. To absolve the benevolent Ahura Mazda from the responsibility of suffering, Sasanian theologians elevated Ahriman to a cosmic counterpart, placing him in direct symmetrical opposition to the supreme god. Despite this radical structural elevation, Ahriman was strictly denied divine status or worship within the Sasanian l doorway:

The Symmetrical Denial of Godhood: Sasanian scholasticism emphasizes that while Ahriman is a primordial power, he completely lacks the attributes of a deity (Yazad). He possesses no divinity, no benevolence, and no systemic intelligence; he is described as ignorant, blind, backward-looking (pas-danishnih), and utterly devoid of foresight. In the Denkard, Ahriman’s nature is characterized as fundamentally deficient and fundamentally negative—an ontological parasite rather than an independent god.

Exclusion from Worship and Rituals: In Sasanian state orthodoxy, no cultic practices, prayers, or sacrifices were ever dedicated to Ahriman. Instead, the entire liturgical framework of Zoroastrianism (such as the Yasna rituals) functioned as a spiritual weapon to actively combat, weaken, and exorcise his influence from the material world. To utter his name in Pahlavi texts, the script was frequently written upside down or struck through as a graphic act of ritual execration, underscoring his status as a loathed fiend rather than a deity to be appeased.

Ontological Non-Existence (A-hastīh): Pahlavi exegesis asserts that Ahriman does not possess true substance or real existence (hastīh). His manifestation is a form of negative presence that only exists via the distortion of reality. Sasanian eschatology explicitly dictates that at the final cleansing of the universe (Frashokereti), Ahriman will not be subdued as a defeated god, but will be utterly annihilated, rendered powerless, and expelled into total non-being, leaving Ahura Mazda's monotheistic sovereignty absolute and unblemished.

== Ahriman after the influence of Islam ==
During the early Islamic centuries (particularly the 10th and 11th centuries CE / 4th and 5th centuries AH), Persian scholars faced the challenge of translating Quranic concepts into New Persian (Dari). To make the text accessible to an Iranian audience transitioning from Zoroastrian cultural frameworks, translators utilized well-known local terms as lexical substitutes for Islamic figures. Consequently, the Arabic terms "Iblis" (إبليس) and "Shaitan" (الشيطان) were directly translated as "Ahriman" or "Ahramen" (أهرمن) in early Persian exegeses, such as the famous translation of Tafsir al-Tabari commissioned during the Samanid era. In this linguistic adaptation, the theological definition of Ahriman was stripped of its dualistic divinity and reframed within the Islamic concept of a created, disobedient jinn who tempts humanity.

Maneckji Nusserwanji Dhalla described the doctrine of the Gayomarthians sect as another attempt to mitigate the dualism that has always been the essence of Zoroastrianism. This was due to the Prophet Muhammad's emphasis on monotheism and the Muslims’ mockery of the doctrine of worshipping two gods. This caused the Zoroastrians to view dualism as a defect, so they added monotheism, which led to the Zoroastrians’ division into sects. Dhalla mentions examples of the Zoroastrian attempt to establish a monotheistic belief by diminishing the importance of Ahriman, including that Ahura Mazda and Ahriman were created from time, or that Ahura Mazda himself allowed the existence of evil, or that Ahriman was a corrupt angel who rebelled against Ahura Mazda. He goes on to mention the name of a Persian book from the 15th century in which it is written that the Magi (Zoroastrians) believe that Allah and Iblis are brothers.

== In present-day Zoroastrianism ==
In 1862, Martin Haug proposed a new reconstruction of what he believed was Zoroaster's original monotheistic teaching, as expressed in the Gathas – a teaching which he believed had been corrupted by later Zoroastrian dualistic tradition as expressed in post-Gathic scripture and in the texts of tradition. For Angra Mainyu, this interpretation meant a demotion from a spirit coequal with Ahura Mazda to a mere product of Ahura Mazda. Haug's theory was based to a great extent on a new interpretation of Yasna 30.3; he argued that the good "twin" in that passage should not be regarded as more or less identical to Ahura Mazda, as earlier Zoroastrian thought had assumed, but as a separate created entity, Spenta Mainyu. Thus, both Angra Mainyu and Spenta Mainyu were created by Ahura Mazda, and should be regarded as his respective 'creative' and 'destructive' emanations.

Haug's interpretation was gratefully received by the Parsis of Bombay, who at the time were under considerable pressure from Christian missionaries (most notable amongst them John Wilson) who sought converts among the Zoroastrian community and criticized Zoroastrianism for its alleged dualism as contrasted with their own monotheism. Haug's reconstruction had also other attractive aspects that seemed to make the religion more compatible with nineteenth-century enlightenment, as he attributed to Zoroaster a rejection of rituals and of worship of entities other than the supreme deity.

These new ideas were subsequently disseminated as a Parsi interpretation, which eventually reached the west and so in turn corroborated Haug's theories. Among the Parsis of the cities, who were accustomed to English language literature, Haug's ideas were more often repeated than those of the Gujarati language objections of the priests, with the result that Haug's ideas became well entrenched and are today almost universally accepted as doctrine.

While some modern scholars (Note: The conclusion that the Fiendish Spirit, too, was an emanation of Ahura Mazdah's is unavoidable. But we need not go so far as to assume that Zarathustra imagined the Devil as having directly issued from God. Rather, since free will, too, is a basic tenet of Zarathushtrianism, we may think of the 'childbirth' implied in the idea of twinship as having consisted in the emanation by God of undifferentiated 'spirit', which only at the emergence of free will split into two "twin" Spirits of opposite allegiance. — Gershevitch (1964), p. 32) (Note: The myth of the Twin Spirits is a model he set for the choice every person is called upon to make. It can not be doubted that both are sons of Ahura Mazda, since they are explicitly said to be twins, and we learn from Y[asna]. 47.2–3 that Ahura Mazda is the father of one of them. Before choosing, neither of them was wicked. There is therefore nothing shocking in Angra Mainyu's being a son of Ahura Mazda, and there is no need to resort to the improbable solution that Zoroaster was speaking figuratively. That Ohrmazd and Ahriman's brotherhood was later considered an abominable heresy is a different matter; Ohrmazd had by then replaced the Bounteous Spirit; and there was no trace any more, in the orthodox view, of the primeval choice, perhaps the prophet's most original conception. — Duchesne-Guillemin (1982), pp. 670–673) have theories similar to Haug's regarding Angra Mainyu's origins, (Note: This Western hypothesis influenced Parsi reformists in the nineteenth century, and still dominates much Parsi theological discussion, as well as being still upheld by some Western scholars. — Boyce (1990)) many now think that the traditional "dualist" interpretation was in fact correct all along and that Angra Mainyu was always considered to be completely separate and independent from Ahura Mazda.

== Influence on Abrahamic religions ==
Scholars of comparative religion argue that Zoroastrian philosophy influenced the development of several spiritual concepts within the Abrahamic religions, particularly the personification of cosmic evil and the figure of Satan.

In Zoroastrian theology, Ahriman (Angra Mainyu) is not considered a god or a divine being but the Destructive Spirit, representing ignorance, falsehood, and destructive choice in opposition to the Holy Spirit (Spenta Mainyu), while remaining ultimately subordinate to Ahura Mazda, the supreme creator.

Several scholars have identified parallels between Ahriman and later Abrahamic portrayals of Satan, including the concept of a conscious malevolent entity associated with deception, corruption, disease, and death.

The influence has also been discussed in relation to eschatology. Zoroastrianism developed a linear vision of history culminating in a final victory of good over evil, a framework that resembles later Jewish, Christian, and Islamic beliefs concerning the resurrection of the dead, final judgment, and the ultimate triumph of divine justice.

The ethical dualism of Zoroastrianism, which emphasizes the human choice between Asha (truth and cosmic order) and the deception of Ahriman, has likewise been cited as a significant factor in the development of post-exilic Jewish and early Christian ideas of heaven, hell, and moral accountability.

Middle Persian texts such as the Bundahishn describe Ahriman as an invasive destructive force seeking to corrupt the creations of Ahura Mazda rather than a rival creator deity.

According to scholars such as Shaul Shaked, the transformation of the concept of an evil adversary in the Near Eastern religious environment reflects complex interactions between Iranian religious ideas and the evolving traditions of Judaism and Christianity, particularly regarding the role of Satan as a personal enemy of righteousness.

== The worship of Ahriman ==
According to Plutarch, Zoroaster taught the worship of Ahriman. The Encyclopedia of Iran claims:

that there existed Ahriman worshippers is attested by Plutarch and in a Dēnkard passage. The former (Isis and Osiris, 46) says that Zoroaster taught the Persians to sacrifice to Areimanios "offerings for averting ill, and things of gloom. For, pounding in a mortar a herb called omomi, they invoke Hades and darkness; then having mingled it with the blood of a slaughtered wolf, they bear it forth into a sunless place and cast it away." And the Dēnkard (p. 182.6) says: "The perverted, devilish, unrighteous rite of the 'mystery of the sorcerers' consists in praising Ahriman, the destroyer." Such a cult must have passed to the mysteries of Mithra, where dedications are found Deo Arimanio. The possibility of statues of Ahriman will be discussed below.

== Islam ==
In Islamic discourse, Ahriman embodies the absolute evil (the Devil) in contrast to Iblis (Satan) who represents an original noble being still under God's power. Although the divs, the creations of Ahriman in Zorastian beliefs, entered Islamic literature, to the point of being identified with the demons of Islamic religion, Ahriman is mostly a stylistic device to refute the idea of absolute evil.

Rumi denies the existence of Ahriman completely:

This is our main quarrel with the Magians (Zoroastrians). They say there are two Gods: the creator of good and the creator of evil. Show me good without evil – then I will admit there is a God of evil and a God of good. This is impossible, for good cannot exist without evil. Since there is no separation between them, how can there be two creators?

== Anthroposophy ==
Rudolf Steiner, who founded the esoteric spiritual movement Anthroposophy, used the concept of Ahriman to name one of two extreme forces which pull humanity away from the centering influence of God. Steiner associated Ahriman, the lower spirit, with materialism, science, heredity, objectivity, and soul-hardening. He thought that contemporary Christianity was subject to Ahrimanic influence, since it tended towards materialistic interpretations. Steiner predicted that Ahriman, as a supersensible Being, would incarnate into an earthly form, some little time after our present earthly existence, in fact in the third post-Christian millennium.

== Opus Sanctorum Angelorum ==
The Opus Sanctorum Angelorum, a debated group inside the Roman Catholic Church, defines Ahriman as a "demon in the Rank of Fallen Powers". It says his duty is to obscure human brains from the Truth of God.
