= Gayomarthians =

Zoroastrian sect

Gayomarthians or Kayumarthiya (Persian: کیومرثیان) was one of the sects of the Zoroastrian religion, who believe that Ahriman was born from the doubt of Hormizd. According to this view, Ahriman is the creation of Hormizd.

== Origin ==
Maneckji Nusserwanji Dhalla described the doctrine of the Gayomarthians sect as another attempt to mitigate the dualism that has always been the essence of Zoroastrianism. This was due to the Prophet Muhammad’s emphasis on monotheism and the Muslims’ mockery of the doctrine of worshipping two gods, which made the Zoroastrians view dualism as a defect, so they added monotheism, which led to the Zoroastrians’ division into sects and he mentions examples of the Zoroastrian attempt to establish a monotheistic belief by diminishing the importance of Ahriman, including that Ahura Mazda and Ahriman were created from time, or that Ahura Mazda himself allowed the existence of evil, or that Ahriman was a corrupt angel who rebelled against Ahura Mazda. Then he mentions the name of a Persian book from the 15th century in which it is written that the Magi (Zoroastrians) believe that Allah and Iblis are brothers.
