= Ahura Mazda =

Highest deity of Zoroastrianism

- Supreme Being; Lord of Wisdom; God of the Sky
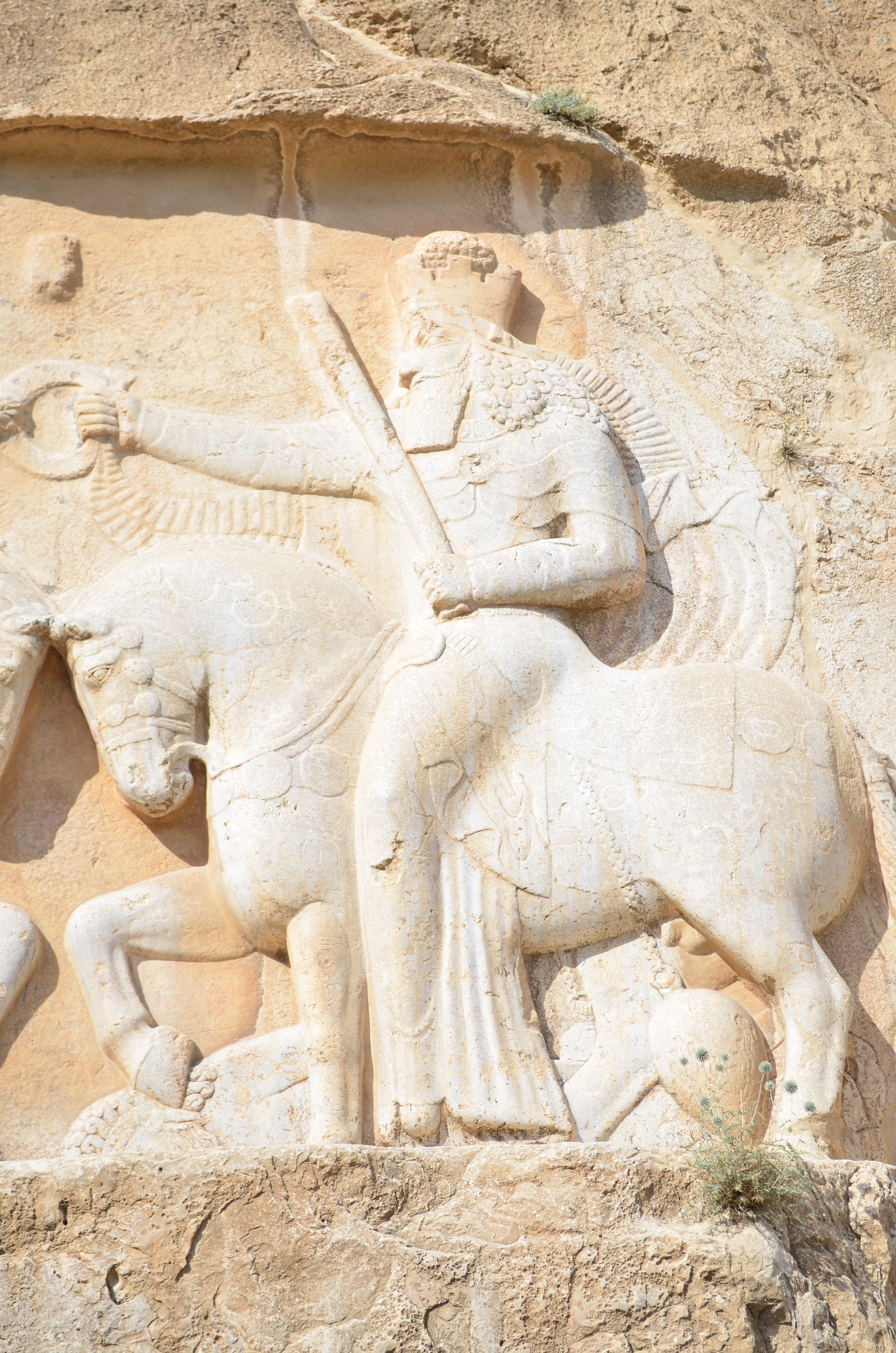
- Sassanid-era relief at Naqsh-e Rostam depicting Ahura Mazda presenting the diadem of sovereignty to Ardashir I
- Other names: Ahura, Ormazd, Hormazd, Hormuz
- Avestan: Ahura Mazdā 𐬀𐬵𐬎𐬭𐬀 𐬨𐬀𐬰𐬛𐬁
- Affiliation: The Thirty-Three Deities, Guardians of the Days of the Month
- Symbol: Light, Goodness
- Sacred flower: Myrtus
- Attributes: The Great Wise One, The Creator of Existence, The one who establishes the Order of Existence (Asha), The Judge
- Day: 1st of each month in the Iranian calendar, Thursday of each week
- Gender: Male
- Festivals: Nowruz

Equivalents
- Abrahamic: Yahweh
- Armenian: Aramazd
- Greek: Zeus
- Vedic: Varuna

Ahura Mazda (Note: Avestan: 𐬀𐬵𐬎𐬭𐬀 𐬨𐬀𐬰𐬛𐬁, romanized: Ahura Mazdā, pronounced [ahuˈra mazˈdaː]; lit. 'Wisdom Lord'; Persian: اهورا مزدا, romanized: Ahurâ Mazdâ, pronounced [ʔæɦuːˌɹɒː mæzˈdɒː]) (/əˌhʊərə ˈmæzdə/ ə-HOOR-ə MAZ-də), also known as Ormazd (Note: Persian: ارمزد [oɹˈmæzd]) (Note: The former is the New Persian rendering of the Avestan form, while the latter derives from Middle Persian.) and Horomazes, (Note: Ancient Greek: Ὡρομάζης, romanized: Hōromázēs, pronounced [hɔːroˈmázdɛːs]; Persian: هرمز, romanized: Hormaz, pronounced [hoɹˈmæz]) and Hoormazd is the principal God and sky deity in Zoroastrianism. He is the first and most frequently invoked spirit in the Yasna. The literal meanings of the words Ahura and Mazda are "lord" and "wisdom", respectively.

The first notable invocation of Ahura Mazda occurred during the Achaemenid period (c. 550–330 BC) with the Behistun Inscription of Darius the Great. Until the reign of Artaxerxes II (c. 405/404–358 BC), Ahura Mazda was worshipped and invoked alone in all extant royal inscriptions. With Artaxerxes II, Ahura Mazda was gathered into a triad of deities with Mithra and Anahita. In the Achaemenid period, the only known representation of Ahura Mazda at the royal court was an empty chariot drawn by white horses, which was used to invite Ahura Mazda to accompany the Persian army into battle.

Ahura Mazda was depicted in images starting from the 5th century BC, but during the Sassanid period, these depictions were replaced by stone-carved figures—and eventually removed entirely—due to an iconoclastic movement supported by the Sasanian dynasty.

== Nomenclature ==
The most likely etymology is from Proto-Indo-European *h₂ḿ̥suros, from *h₂ems- ("to engender, beget"), and therefore it is cognate with Sanskrit ásura and Proto-Germanic *ansuz. Finnish Indologist Asko Parpola locates a borrowing from Proto-Indo-Aryan *asera- to the Uralic languages, with the meaning 'lord, prince'.

'Mazda', or rather the Avestan stem-form Mazdā-, nominative Mazdå, reflects Proto-Iranian *mazdáH (a feminine noun). It is generally taken to be the proper name of the spirit and, like its Vedic cognate medhā́, means "intelligence" or "wisdom". Both the Avestan and the Sanskrit words reflect Proto-Indo-Iranian *mazdʰáH, from Proto-Indo-European *mn̥sdʰh₁éh₂, literally meaning "placing (*dʰeh₁) one's mind (*mn̥-s)", hence "wise".

In Old Persian, during the Achaemenid era, the name was either depicted using the cuneiform logograms 𐏈 or 𐏉 (genitive 𐏊), or spelled out as 𐎠𐎢𐎼𐎶𐏀𐎭𐎠 (a-u-r-m-z-d-a, Auramazdā). In Parthian, the name was written as 𐭀𐭇𐭅𐭓𐭌𐭆𐭃 (ʾḥwrmzd, Ahurmazd), while 𐭠𐭥𐭧𐭥𐭬𐭦𐭣𐭩 (ʾwhrmzdy, Ōhramazdē) was the Middle Persian term used during the Sassanid era.

The name may be attested on cuneiform tablets of Assyrian Assurbanipal, in the form Assara Mazaš, but that interpretation is very controversial.

== Before Zoroastrianism ==
Mazdaism is a religion that arose in Eastern Iran, modern-day Afghanistan, and Central Asia beginning in the early centuries of the first millennium.

The worship of Ahura Mazda, as some Zoroastrian historians believe, was not originated by Zoroaster, but existed before the prophet's message. According to R.C. Zaehner, the pre-Zoroastrian Ahura Mazda was undoubtedly associated with the concept of truth or the idea of some kind of "universal order," as well as with water, light, or the sun.

Emile Benveniste points out that Ahura Mazda is an ancient deity and that the Zoroastrians used this name to refer to the Zoroastrian god. Even the central role assigned to this god in Mazdaism is not a Zoroastrian innovation. The title Mazdaism (worshipper of Mazda) found in Aramaic papyri from the Achaemenid period cannot be evidence that the Achaemenids were Zoroastrian, and the mention of the name Ahura Mazda in stone inscriptions is not evidence of this either. In the Achaemenid inscriptions, not only is Zoroastrianism not mentioned, but nothing else is mentioned that could give these inscriptions a Zoroastrian signal.

== Marriage to Spenta Armaiti and Zurvanist theogony ==
In some Zurvanist narratives, it is mentioned that Zurvan had a wife who gave birth to Ahura Mazda and Ahriman; later, Ahura Mazda married his mother and had children with her, including the sun, dogs, pigs, donkeys, and cattle.

But in non-Zurvanist Zoroastrian traditions, it is said that Ahura Mazda married his daughter Spenta Armaiti and she gave birth to Keyumars, and later she gave birth to Mashya and Mashyana. These traditions are considered to be that Keyumars was born to the same mother as Mashya and Mashyana, and not that Mashya and Mashyana are the children of Keyumars.

== Zoroaster's revelation ==
According to Zoroastrian tradition, at the age of 30, Zoroaster received a revelation: while fetching water at dawn for a sacred ritual, he saw the shining figure of an Amesha Spenta, Vohu Manah, who led Zoroaster to the presence of Ahura Mazda, where he was taught the cardinal principles of the "Good Religion" later known as Zoroastrianism. As a result of this vision, Zoroaster felt that he was chosen to spread and preach the religion. He stated that this source of all goodness was the Ahura, worthy of the highest worship. He further stated that Ahura Mazda created spirits known as yazatas to aid him. Zoroaster proclaimed that some Iranian gods were daevas who deserved no worship. These "bad" deities were created by Angra Mainyu, the destructive spirit. Angra Mainyu was the source of all sin and misery in the universe. Zoroaster claimed that Ahura Mazda used the aid of humans in the cosmic struggle against Angra Mainyu. Nonetheless, Ahura Mazda is Angra Mainyu's superior, not his equal. Angra Mainyu and his daevas, which attempt to attract humans away from the Path of Asha, would eventually be defeated.

== Plutarch ==
According to Plutarch, Zoroaster named "Arimanius" as one of the two rivals who were the artificers of good and evil. In terms of sense perception, Oromazes was to be compared to light, and Arimanius to darkness and ignorance; between these was Mithras the Mediator. Arimanius received offerings that pertained to warding off evil and mourning.

In describing a ritual to Arimanius, Plutarch says the god was invoked as Hades gives the identification as Pluto, the name of the Greek ruler of the underworld used most commonly in texts and inscriptions pertaining to the mystery religions, and in Greek dramatists and philosophers of Athens in the Classical period. Turcan notes that Plutarch makes of Arimanius "a sort of tenebrous Pluto". Plutarch, however, names the Greek god as Hades, not the name Plouton used in the Eleusinian tradition (Note: For distinctions in usage between the two names, see Pluto in the mysteries and cult and Pluto in Greek literature and philosophy.) ("The Hidden One") and darkness. (Note: In Greek religion, Hades was the ruler of the dead or shades, but not an evil god per se, except in the sense that death might be considered a bad thing – κακόν, kakon.)

The Arimanius ritual required an otherwise-unknown plant that Plutarch calls "omomi" (Haoma or Soma), which was to be pounded in a mortar and mixed with the blood of a sacrificed wolf. The substance was then carried to a place "where the sun never shines" and cast therein. He adds that "water-rats" belong to this god, and therefore proficient rat-killers are fortunate men.

Plutarch then gives a cosmogonical myth:

Oromazes, born from the purest light, and Areimanius, born from darkness, are constantly at war with each other; and Oromazes created six gods, the first of Good Thought, the second of Truth, the third of Order, and, of the rest, one of Wisdom, one of Wealth, and one the Artificer of Pleasure in what is Honourable. But Areimanius created rivals, as it were, equal to these in number. Then Oromazes enlarged himself to thrice his former size, and removed himself as far distant from the Sun as the Sun is distant from the Earth, and adorned the heavens with stars. One star he set there before all others as a guardian and watchman, the Dog-star. Twenty-four other gods he created and placed in an egg. But those created by Areimanius, who were equal in number to the others, pierced through the egg and made their way inside; hence evils are now combined with good. But a destined time shall come when it is decreed that Areimanius, engaged in bringing on pestilence and famine, shall by these be utterly annihilated and shall disappear; and then shall the earth become a level plain, and there shall be one manner of life and one form of government for a blessed people who shall all speak one tongue. — Plutarch

Scholar Mary Boyce asserted that the passage shows a "fairly accurate" knowledge of basic Zoroastrianism.

In his Life of Themistocles, Plutarch has the Persian king invoke Arimanius by name, asking the god to cause the king's enemies to behave in such a way as to drive away their own best men; de Jong (1997) doubted that a Persian king would pray to his own national religion's god of evil, particularly in public.

According to Plutarch, the king then made a sacrifice and got drunk – essentially a running gag on Persian kings in Plutarch's writing, and thus dubious evidence for actual behavior.

== History ==
=== Achaemenid Empire ===
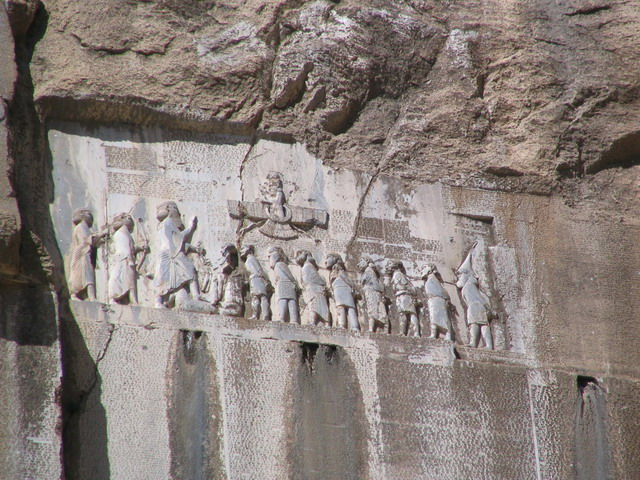
The Behistun Inscription contains many references to Ahura Mazda

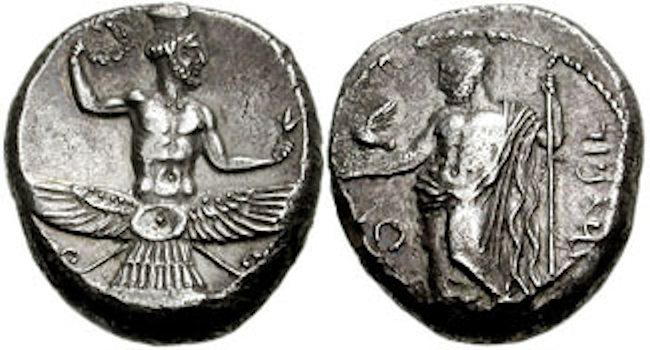
Stater of Tiribazos, Satrap of Lydia, c. 380 BC showing Ahura Mazda

Whether the Achaemenids were Zoroastrians is a matter of much debate. However, it is known that the Achaemenids were worshipers of Ahura Mazda. The representation and invocation of Ahura Mazda can be seen on royal inscriptions written by Achaemenid kings. The most notable of all the inscriptions is the Behistun Inscription written by Darius the Great which contains many references to Ahura Mazda. An inscription written in Greek was found in a late Achaemenid temple at Persepolis, which invoked Ahura Mazda and two other deities, Mithra and Anahita. Artaxerxes III makes this invocation Ahuramazda again during his reign.

In the Elamite language Persepolis Fortification Tablets dated between 509 and 494 BC, offerings to Ahura Mazda are recorded in tablets #377, #338 (notably alongside Mitra), #339, and #771.

The early Achaemenid period contained no representation of Ahura Mazda. The winged symbol with a male figure formerly regarded by European scholars as Ahura Mazda has been now speculated to represent the royal khvarenah, the personification of divine power and regal glory. However, it was customary for every emperor from Cyrus until Darius III to have an empty chariot drawn by white horses as a place for Ahura Mazda to accompany the Persian army on battles. The use of images of Ahura Mazda began in the western satraps of the Achaemenid Empire in the late 5th century BC. Under Artaxerxes II, the first literary reference, as well as a statue of Ahura Mazda, was built by a Persian governor of Lydia in 365 BC.

=== Parthian Empire ===
It is known that the reverence for Ahura Mazda, as well as Anahita and Mithra, continued with the same traditions during this period. The worship of Ahura Mazda with symbolic images is noticed, but it stopped within the Sassanid period. Zoroastrian iconoclasm, which can be traced to the end of the Parthian period and the beginning of the Sassanid, eventually put an end to the use of all images of Ahura Mazda in worship. However, Ahura Mazda remained symbolized by a dignified male figure, standing or on horseback, which is found in Sassanian investiture.

=== Sasanian Empire ===
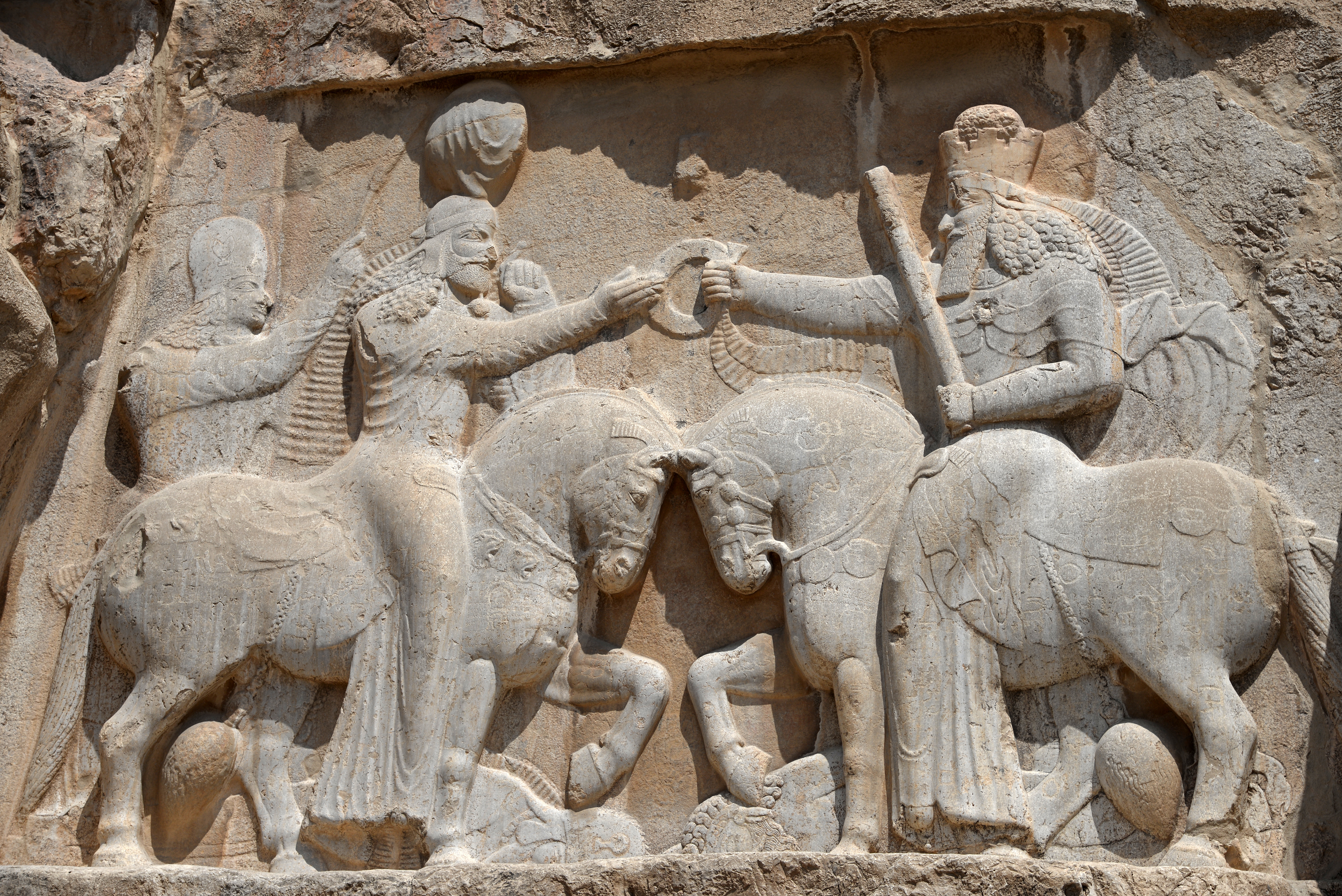
Ahura Mazda (on the right, with high crown) presents Ardashir I (left) with the ring of kingship. (Naqsh-e Rostam, 3rd century AD)

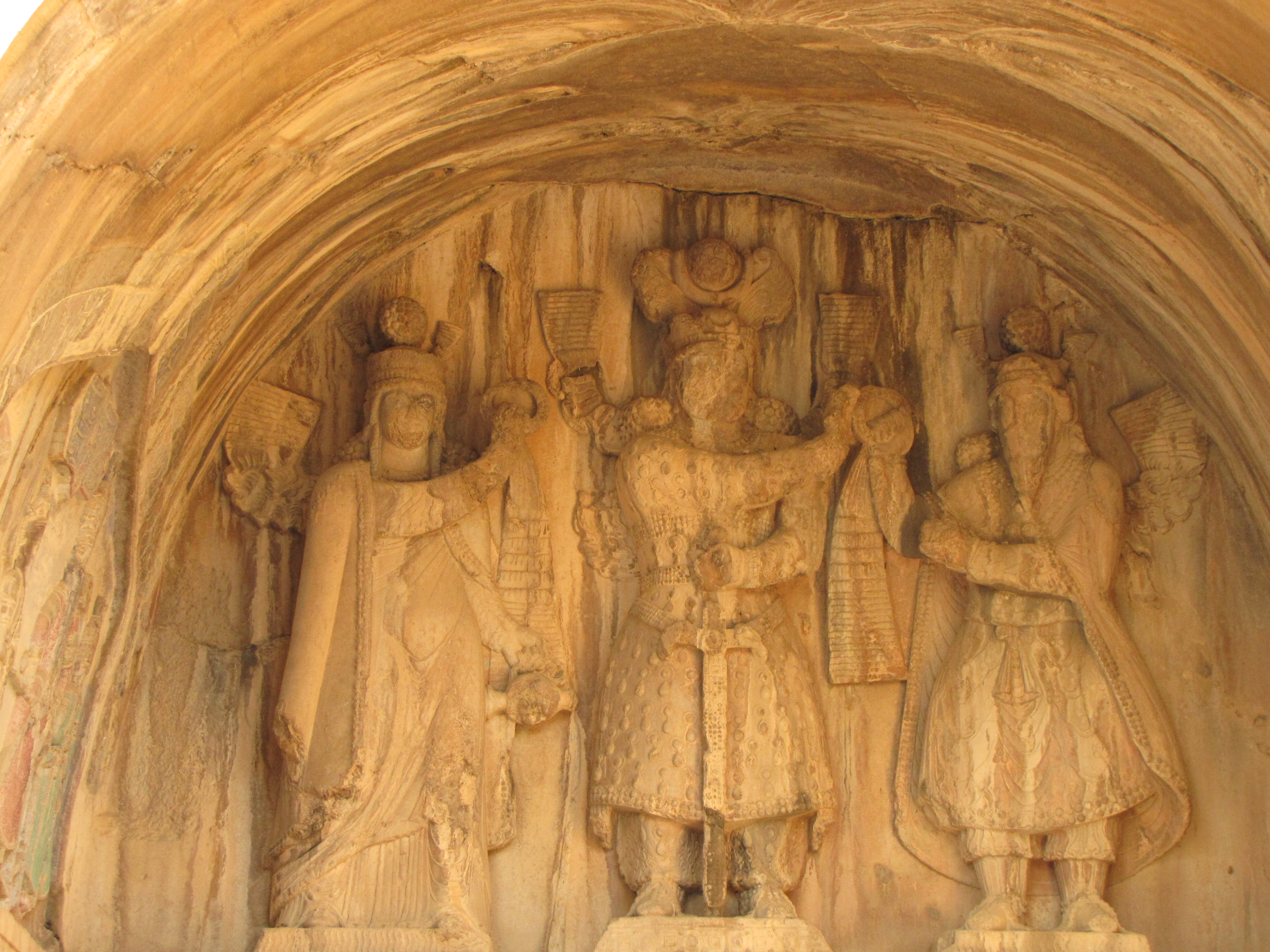
Investiture scene: Anahita on the left as the patron yazata of the Sasanian dynasty behind Emperor Khosrow II, with Ahura Mazda presenting the khvarenah of sovereignty on the right. Taq-e Bostan, Iran

During the Sassanid Empire, a heretical and divergent form of Zoroastrianism, termed Zurvanism, emerged. It gained adherents throughout the Sasanian Empire, most notably the royal lineage of Sasanian emperors. Under the reign of Shapur I, Zurvanism spread and became a widespread cult.

Zurvanism revokes Zoroaster's original message of Ahura Mazda as the uncreated spirit and the "uncreated creator" of all and reduces him to a created spirit, one of two twin sons of Zurvan, their father and the primary spirit. Zurvanism also makes Ahura Mazda and Angra Mainyu of equal strength and only contrasting spirits.

Besides Zurvanism, the Sassanian kings demonstrated their devotion to Ahura Mazda in different fashions. Five kings took the name Hormizd and Bahram II created the title of "Ohrmazd-mowbad", which was continued after the Muslim conquest of Persia and through Islamic times.

All devotional acts in Zoroastrianism originating from the Sassanian period begin with homage to Ahura Mazda. The five Gāhs start with the declaration in Middle Persian that "Ohrmazd is Lord" and incorporate the Gathic verse "Whom, Mazda hast thou appointed my protector". Zoroastrian prayers are to be said in the presence of light, either in the form of fire or the sun. In the Iranian languages Yidgha and Munji, the sun is still called ormozd.

=== Rashidun Caliphate ===
Maneckji Nusserwanji Dhalla described the doctrine of the Gayomarthians sect as another attempt to mitigate the dualism that has always been the essence of Zoroastrianism. This was due to the Prophet Muhammad’s emphasis on monotheism and the Muslims’ mockery of the doctrine of worshipping two gods, which made the Zoroastrians view dualism as a defect, so they added monotheism, which led to the Zoroastrians’ division into sects and he mentions examples of the Zoroastrian attempt to establish a monotheistic belief by diminishing the importance of Ahriman, including that Ahura Mazda and Ahriman were created from time, or that Ahura Mazda himself allowed the existence of evil, or that Ahriman was a corrupt angel who rebelled against Ahura Mazda. Then he mentions the name of a Persian book from the 15h century in which it is written that the Magi (Zoroastrians) believe that Allah and Iblis are brothers.

=== Present-day Zoroastrianism ===
In 1884, Martin Haug proposed a new interpretation of Yasna 30.3 that subsequently influenced Zoroastrian doctrine significantly. According to Haug's interpretation, the "twin spirits" of 30.3 were Angra Mainyu and Spenta Mainyu, the former being literally the "Destructive Spirit" (Note: For an explanation of the approximation of mainyu as "spirit", see Angra Mainyu.) and the latter being the "Bounteous Spirit" (of Ahura Mazda). Further, in Haug's scheme, Angra Mainyu was now not Ahura Mazda's binary opposite, but—like Spenta Mainyu—an emanation of Him. Haug also interpreted the concept of a free will of Yasna 45.9 as an accommodation to explain where Angra Mainyu came from since Ahura Mazda created only good. The free will made it possible for Angra Mainyu to choose to be evil. Although these latter conclusions were not substantiated by Zoroastrian tradition, at the time, Haug's interpretation was gratefully accepted by the Parsis of Bombay since it provided a defense against Christian missionary rhetoric, (Note: Most prominent of these voices was that of the Scottish Presbyterian minister John Wilson, whose church was next door to the M. F. Cama Athornan Institute, the premier school for Zoroastrian priests. That the opinions of the Zoroastrian priesthood were barely represented in the debates that ensued was to some extent since the priesthood spoke Gujarati and not English, but also because they were (at the time) poorly equipped to debate with a classically trained theologian on his footing. Wilson had even taught himself Avestan.) particularly the attacks on the Zoroastrian idea of an uncreated Evil that was as uncreated as God was. Following Haug, the Bombay Parsis began to defend themselves in the English-language press. The argument was that Angra Mainyu was not Mazda's binary opposite but his subordinate, who—as in Zurvanism also—chose to be evil. Consequently, Haug's theories were disseminated as a Parsi interpretation in the West, where they appeared to be corroborating Haug. Reinforcing themselves, Haug's ideas came to be iterated so often that they are today almost universally accepted as doctrine. (Note: For a scholastic review of the theological developments in Indian Zoroastrianism, particularly concerning the devaluation of Angra Mainyu to a position where the (epitome of) pure evil became viewed as a creation of Mazda (and so compromised their figure of pure good), see Maneck 1997)

== In other religions ==
Some scholars (Kuiper. IIJ I, 1957; Zimmer. Münchner Studien 1984:187–215) believe that Ahura Mazda originates from *vouruna-miθra, or Vedic Varuna (and Mitra). According to William W. Malandra both Varuna (in Vedic period) and Ahura Mazda (in old Iranian religion) represented the same Indo-Iranian concept of a supreme "wise, all-knowing lord".

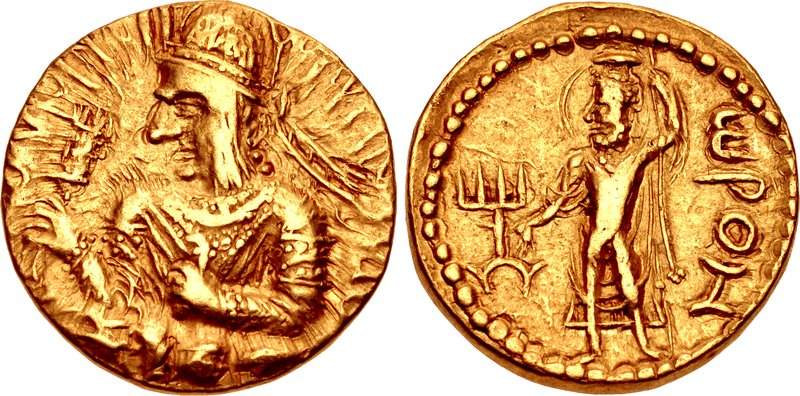
Kushan coinage of Huvishka with Ahuramazda on the reverse (Greek legend ωΡΟΜ, Orom[zdo]). 150–180 AD

In Manichaeism, the name Ohrmazd Bay ("god Ahura Mazda") was used for the primal figure Nāšā Qaḏmāyā, the "original man" and emanation of the Father of Greatness (in Manicheism called Zurvan) through whom after he sacrificed himself to defend the world of light was consumed by the forces of darkness. Although Ormuzd is freed from the world of darkness his "sons", often called his garments or weapons, remain. After a series of events, his sons, later known as the World Soul, will, for the most part, escape from matter and return to the world of light where they came from. Manicheans often identified many of Mani's cosmological figures with Zoroastrian ones. This may partly be because Mani was born in the greatly Zoroastrian Parthian Empire.

In Sogdian Buddhism, Xwrmztʼ (Sogdian was written without a consistent representation of vowels) was the Sogdian derivation of the Avestan Ahura Mazda. Adhvagh was often used as a title for Ahura Mazda. Via contacts with Turkic peoples like the Uyghurs, this Sogdian name came to the Mongols, who still name this deity Qormusta Tengri (also Qormusta or Qormusda) is now a popular enough deity to appear in many contexts that are not explicitly Buddhist.

The pre-Christian Armenians held Aramazd as an important deity in their pantheon of gods. He is thought to be a syncretic deity, a combination of the autochthonous Armenian figures Aram and his son Ara and the Iranian Ahura Mazda. In modern-day Armenia, Aramazd is a male first name.

== Legacy ==
In modern history, Japanese multinational automotive manufacturer MAZDA, chose the name that derives from Ahura Mazda. The company interpolated the name as: "the god of wisdom, intelligence, and harmony, as a symbol of the origin of both Eastern and Western civilizations, and also as a symbol of automotive culture".

== 101 Names ==
1. yazat ("Worthy of worship.")
2. harvasp-tavãn ("Infinite Potency.")
3. harvasp-âgâh ("Infinite Wisdom.")
4. harvasp-h'udhâ ("The Lord of all.")
5. abadah ("Without beginning.")
6. awî-añjâm ("Without end.")
7. bûnastah ("The origin of the formation of the world.")
8. frâxtañtah ("Broad end of all.")
9. jamakh ("Greatest cause.")
10. parjahtarah ("More exalted.")
11. tum-afayah ("Most innocent.")
12. abravañt ("Apart from everyone.")
13. parvañdah ("Relation with all.")
14. an-ayâfah ("Incomprehensible by anyone.")
15. ham-ayâfah ("Comprehensible of all.")
16. âdharô ("Most straight, most just.")
17. gîrâ ("Holding fast all.")
18. acim ("Without reason.")
19. cimnâ ("Reason of reasons.")
20. safinâ ("Increaser.")
21. âwzâ ("Causer of increase. The Lord of purity")
22. nâshâ ("Reaching all equally.")
23. parvarâ ("Nourisher.")
24. âyânah ("Protector of the world.")
25. âyaîn-âyânah ("Not of various kinds.")
26. an-âyanah ("Without form.")
27. xraoshît-tum ("Firmest.")
28. mînôtum ("Most invisible.")
29. vâsnâ ("Omnipresent.")
30. harvastum ("All in all.")
31. husipâs ("Worthy of thanks.")
32. har-hemît ("All good-natured.")
33. harnekfareh ("All good auspicious-glory.")
34. beshtarnâ ("Remover of affliction.")
35. tarônîs ("The triumphant.")
36. anaoshak ("Immortal.")
37. farashak ("Fulfiller of wishes.")
38. pazohadhad ("Creator of good nature.")
39. xavâpar ("Beneficient.")
40. awaxshâyâ ("Bestower of Love.")
41. awarzâ ("Excessive bringer.")
42. â-sitôh ("Undefeated, undistressed.")
43. raxôh ("Independent, carefree.")
44. varûn ("Protector from evil.")
45. a-frîpah ("Undeceivable.")
46. awe-frîftah ("Undeceived.")
47. adhvaî ("Unparalleled.")
48. kãme-rat ("Lord of wishes.")
49. framãn-kãm ("Only wish is His command.")
50. âyextan ("Without body.")
51. â-framôsh ("Unforgetful.")
52. hamârnâ ("Taker of accounts.")
53. snâyâ ("Recognizable, worth recognition.")
54. a-tars ("Fearless.")
55. a-bîsh ("Without affliction or torment.")
56. a-frâzdum ("Most exalted.")
57. hamcûn ("Always uniform.")
58. mînô-stîgar ("Creator of the Universe spiritually.")
59. a-mînôgar ("Creator of much spirituality.")
60. mînô-nahab ("Hidden in Spirits.")
61. âdhar-bâtgar ("Air of fire, i.e. transformer into air.")
62. âdhar-namgar ("Water of fire, i.e. transformer into water.")
63. bât-âdhargar ("Transformer of air into fire.")
64. bât-namgar ("Transformer of air into water.")
65. bât-gelgar ("Transformer of air into earth.")
66. bât-girdtum ("Transformer of air into girad, i.e. gathered.")
67. âdhar-kîbarît-tum ("Transformer of fire into jewels.")
68. bâtgarjâi ("Who creates air in all places.")
69. âwtum ("Creator of most excessive water.")
70. gel-âdhargar ("Transformer of the earth into fire.")
71. gel-vâdhgar ("Transformer of the earth into air.")
72. gel-namgar ("Transformer of the earth into water.")
73. gargar ("Artisan of artisans.")
74. garôgar ("Bestower of wishes.")
75. garâgar ("Creator of man")
76. garâgargar ("Creator of the entire creation")
77. a-garâgar ("Creator of four elements")
78. a-garâgargar ("Creator of clusters of the stars")
79. a-gûmãn ("Without doubt.")
80. a-jamãn ("Without time.")
81. a-h'uãn ("Without sleep.")
82. âmushthushyâr ("Intelligent.")
83. frashûtanâ ("Eternal protector-increaser.")
84. padhamãnî ("Maintainer of padman, i.e. the golden mean.")
85. pîrôzgar ("Victorious.")
86. h'udhâvañd ("Lord-Master of the Universe.")
87. ahuramazda ("Lord Omniscient.")
88. abarînkuhantavãn ("Of the most exalted rank in the power of maintaining the origin of the creations.")
89. abarîn-nô-tavã ("Of the most exalted rank in the power of rendering the creations anew.")
90. vaspãn ("Attainer to all the creations.")
91. vaspâr ("Bringer of and attainer to all.")
92. h'âwar ("Merciful.")
93. ahû ("Lord of the world.")
94. âwaxsîdâr ("Forgiver.")
95. dâdhâr ("The just creator.")
96. rayomañd ("Full of rae-lustre-splendour.")
97. h'arehmand ("Full of khoreh, i.e. glory.")
98. dâwar ("The just judge.")
99. kerfagar ("Lord of meritorious deeds.")
100. buxtâr ("Redeemer, saviour.")
101. frashôgar ("Restorer through increase of the soul.")

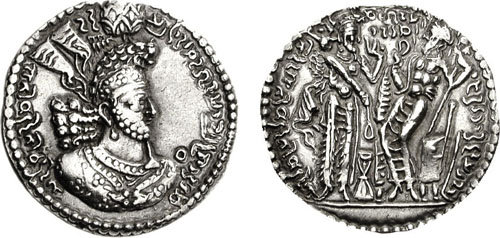
Coin of Hormizd I Kushanshah (277-286 AD). Pahlavi inscription: "The Mazda worshipper, the divine Hormizd the great Kushan king of kings"/ Pahlavi inscription: "Exalted god, Hormizd the great Kushan king of kings", Hormizd standing right, holding investiture wreath over altar and raising left hand in benedictional gesture to Anahita holding investiture wreath and sceptre. Merv mint

== See also ==
- Asura
- Varuna
- Creator deity
- Names of God
- Mazda

== Bibliography ==
- Andrea, Alfred; Overfield, James H. (2000), The Human Record: Sources of Global History : To 1700, vol. 4 (Illustrated ed.), Houghton Mifflin Harcourt, ISBN 978-0-618-04245-6
- Boyce, Mary (1975), History of Zoroastrianism, Vol. I, The early period, Leiden: Brill
- Boyce, Mary (1983), "Ahura Mazdā", Encyclopaedia Iranica, vol. 1, New York: Routledge & Kegan Paul, pp. 684–687
- Maneck, Susan Stiles (1997), The Death of Ahriman: Culture, Identity and Theological Change Among the Parsis of India, Bombay: K. R. Cama Oriental Institute, archived from the original on 6 March 2021
- Sims-Williams, Nicholas (1992), Sogdian and other Iranian inscriptions of the Upper Indus, University of Michigan, ISBN 978-0-7286-0194-9
- Corduan, Winfried (1998), Neighboring faiths: a Christian introduction to world religions, InterVarsity Press, ISBN 978-0-8308-1524-1
- Frye, Richard Nelson (1996), The heritage of Central Asia from antiquity to the Turkish expansion, Markus Wiener Publishers, ISBN 978-1-55876-111-7
- Unknown (1999), History of civilizations of Central Asia, Volume 3, Motilal Banarsidass Publ
- King, Karen L. (2005), What is Gnosticism?, Harvard University Press, ISBN 978-0-674-01762-7
- Whitrow, G. J. (2003), What is time?, Oxford University Press, ISBN 978-0-19-860781-6
- Bromiley, Geoffrey (1995), The International Standard Bible Encyclopedia: Q-Z, Wm. B. Eerdmans Publishing, ISBN 978-0-8028-3784-4
- Nigosian, Solomon (1993), The Zoroastrian faith: tradition and modern research, McGill-Queen's Press – MQUP, ISBN 978-0-7735-1144-6
