= Jacques Duchesne-Guillemin =

Belgian orientalist

- Born: Jacques Duchesne; April 21, 1910; Jupille-sur-Meuse, Belgium
- Died: February 8, 2012 (aged 101); Liège, Belgium
- Resting place: Cimetière de Robermont, Liège
- Education: Catholic University of Leuven
- Occupation: Professor
- Employer: University of Liège
- Organization(s): Académie des Inscriptions et Belles-Lettres; Association for the Advancement of Iranian Studies; Royal Danish Academy of Sciences and Letters
- Notable work: Zoroastre (1948); La Religion de l’Iran Ancien (1962)
- Spouse: Marcelle Duchesne-Guillemin
- Awards: Prix de la langue française (1956); Honorary doctorate from the University of Tehran (1974)

Jacques Duchesne-Guillemin (French: [dyʃɛn ɡijɛlmɛ̃]; né Jacques Duchesne, 21 April 1910 – 8 February 2012) was a Belgian linguist, philologist, and orientalist who was professor at the University of Liège and specialized in ancient Iran. Duchesne-Guillemin began his teaching career with the untimely death of his collaborator and mentor at the University of Liège, Auguste Bricteux, in 1937, becoming a professor in 1943 and a full professor in 1964.

With the publication of his Zoroaster (a translation of the Gāthās of the Avesta, consisting of seventeen hymns attributed to Zoroaster) in 1948, Duchesne-Guillemin became one of the major figures in the study of the Avestan language of ancient Iran. At different times in his career, he lectured at Columbia University, the University of Chicago, and the University of California at Los Angeles. His 1962 La Religion de l’Iran Ancien is still considered a masterpiece and the best scholarly introduction to Zoroastrianism despite the decades of subsequent developments in the scholarship of the religion. His international reputation culminated in his appointment, in 1973, as editor of the series Acta Iranica.

In 1974, Duchesne-Guillemin was awarded an honorary doctorate from the University of Tehran.

== Publications ==
- Ormazd et Ahriman, l'aventure dualiste dans l'antiquité, PUF, 1953, 156 pp.
- La Religion de l'Iran ancien, Paris, PUF, 1962, 411 pp.
- Le Croissant fertile : la découverte de l'Asie antérieure, Paris, 1963.
- "Islam et mazdéisme", in Mélanges Mass, 1963, pp. 105-109.
- Zoroastre : étude critique, avec une traduction commentée des Gâthâ, Paris, Robert Laffont, 1976, 265 pp.
- "Pour l'étude de Hafiz", in Acta Iranica, vol. XXI (1981), pp. 141-163.
- Dictionnaire des religions, Paris, PUF (1984).
- Les Instruments de Musique dans L'Art Sassanide. Leuven: Imprimerie Orientaliste, 1993, 130 pp.

== See also ==
- Charles P. Melville
