= Encyclopedia of Iranian Architectural History =

Encyclopaedia of Iranian Architectural History
- Website type: Encyclopedia
- Available in: Persian
- Country of origin: Iran
- Owners: Iranian Academy of the Arts and Ministry of Roads and Urban Development
- Website: iranarchpedia.ir
- Registration: None
- Launched: 2006; 20 years ago
- Current status: Available

The Encyclopaedia of Iranian Architectural History is an encyclopedia with articles on the history of architecture in the Iranian World. In 2006, it was established by the Iranian Ministry of Roads and Urban Development, and co-sponsored by the Iranian Academy of the Arts. Mohammad Beheshti Shirazi, former head of the Cultural Heritage, Handicrafts and Tourism Organization of Iran, is responsible for the group of researchers who are preparing this encyclopedia.
