= Corpus Inscriptionum et Monumentorum Religionis Mithriacae =

Corpus Inscriptionum et Monumentorum Religionis Mithriacae (CIMRM) is a two-volume collection of inscriptions and monuments relating primarily to the Mithraic Mysteries. It was compiled by Maarten Jozef Vermaseren and published at The Hague by Martinus Nijhoff Publishers, 1956, 1960 in 2 vols. Publication was sponsored by the Royal Flemish Academy and the Netherlands Organization for Pure Research. It is based on an earlier 1947 work of the same title that began as an entry in a competition organized by the Department of Fine Arts and Literature of the Flemish Academy.

It is viewed as "an undiscriminating work", with "unpredictable topographic zig-zagging", but it remains indispensable for its access to the great bulk of the archaeological evidence. Although now 66 years old, no updated corpora have been published since Vermaseren's, and CIMRM thus remains the standard reference catalog of inscriptions and monuments of the Mithraic Mysteries.

Between 1960 and the time of his death in 1990, Vermaseren had accrued a substantial amount of material for a third volume of CIMRM. After his death, this collection was passed on to some Dutch scholar, and the trail of the material was lost. In August 2004, Richard Gordon posted an appeal on the website of the Electronic Journal of Mithraic Studies, requesting information on the whereabouts of the material.

== Bibliography ==
- Clauss, Manfred (2000), The Roman Cult of Mithras: The God and His Mysteries, trans. R. L. Gordon, New York: Routledge.
- Daniels, Charles M. (1975), "The role of the Roman army in the spread and practice of Mithraism", in Hinnels, John R. (ed.), Mithraic Studies: Proceedings of the First International Congress of Mithraic Studies, Manchester UP, pp. II.459–474.
- Gordon, Richard L. (1994), "Who worshipped Mithras?", Journal of Roman Archaeology, 7: 459–474, doi:10.1017/S1047759400012873.
- Gordon, Richard L. (2004), "CIMRM Supplement", Electronic Journal of Mithraic Studies, IV, archived from the original on 2001-06-20.
- Nock, Arthur Darby (1958), "Vermaseren's Corpus Religionis Mithriacae I", Gnomon, 30 (H.4): 291–295.
- Vermaseren, M. J. (1960) [1956], Corpus inscriptionum et monumentorum religionis mithriacae, 2 vols., The Hague: Martinus Nijhoff.
