= Mary Boyce =

British scholar in Iranian Studies (1920–2006)

- Born: Nora Elisabeth Mary Boyce; 2 August 1920; Darjeeling, British India
- Died: 4 April 2006 (aged 85)
- Occupation: Philologist
- Known for: Authority on Zoroastrianism

Nora Elisabeth Mary Boyce (2 August 1920 – 4 April 2006) was a British scholar of Iranian languages and an authority on Zoroastrianism. She was Professor of Iranian Studies at the School of Oriental and African Studies (SOAS) of the University of London. The Royal Asiatic Society's annual Boyce Prize for outstanding contributions to the study of religion is named after her.

== Early years ==
She was born in Darjeeling in British India where her parents were vacationing to escape the heat of the plains during the summer. Her father, William H. Boyce, was a Judge at the Calcutta high-court, then an institution of the British imperial government. Her mother Nora (née Gardiner) was a granddaughter of the historian Samuel Rawson Gardiner.

Boyce was educated at Wimbledon High School and then Cheltenham Ladies' College. At Newnham College, Cambridge she studied English, archaeology and anthropology, graduating with a double first.

== Academic career ==
In 1944, Boyce joined the faculty of the Royal Holloway College, University of London, where she taught Anglo-Saxon literature and archaeology until 1946. Simultaneously she continued her studies, this time in Persian languages, under the guidance of Vladimir Minorsky at the School of Oriental and African Studies from 1945 to 1947. There she met her future mentor, Walter Bruno Henning, under whose tutelage she began to study Middle Iranian languages.

In 1948, Boyce was appointed lecturer of Iranian Studies at SOAS, specialising in Manichaean, Zoroastrian Middle Persian and Parthian texts. In 1952, she was awarded a doctorate in Oriental Studies from the University of Cambridge. At SOAS, she was promoted to Reader (1958–1961) and subsequently awarded the University of London's professorship in Iranian Studies following Henning's transfer to the University of California at Berkeley.

Boyce remained professor at SOAS until her retirement in 1982, continuing as Professor Emerita and a professorial research associate until her death in 2006. Her speciality remained the religions of speakers of Eastern Iranian languages, in particular Manichaeanism and Zoroastrianism.

== Awards and recognition ==
Boyce was a recipient of the Royal Asiatic Society's Burton Medal, and of the Sykes Medal of the Royal Society of Asian Affairs. She was a member of the Council of the Royal Asiatic Society, honorary member of the American Oriental Society, member of the Royal Danish Academy of Sciences and Letters, and was the first secretary and treasurer of the Corpus Inscriptionum Iranicarum. She served on the editorial board of numerous academic publications, including Asia Major, the Encyclopaedia Iranica, the Bulletin of the School of Oriental and African Studies, and the Journal of the American Oriental Society.

== Publications ==
In 1963–64, Boyce spent a research year among orthodox Zoroastrians of the 24 villages of Yazd, Iran. The results of her research there were formative to her understanding of Zoroastrianism and she discovered that much of the previously established scholarship on the ancient faith was terribly misguided. In 1975, Boyce presented the results of her research at her Ratanbai Katrak lecture series at Oxford University. In the same year she published the first volume of her magnum opus, The History of Zoroastrianism, which appeared in the monograph series Handbuch der Orientalistik (Leiden: Brill). Her Ratanbai Katrak lecture series were published in 1977 as A Persian Stronghold of Zoroastrianism.

In 1979, Boyce published Zoroastrians: Their Religious Beliefs and Practices, which not only summarised her previous publications (in particular volume 1 of History), but anthologised the role of Zoroastrianism during subsequent eras as well. This was followed by volume 2 of History of Zoroastrianism in 1982 (also as a part of the Orientalistik monograph series), and volume 3 in 1991 which she co-authored with Frantz Grenet. In 1992, she published Zoroastrianism: Its Antiquity and Constant Vigour as part of the Columbia Lectures on Iranian Studies which she had delivered there in 1985.

=== Selected works ===
- 1954, The Manichaean hymn-cycles in Parthian (London Oriental Series, Vol. 3). London: Oxford University Press.
- 1975, A History of Zoroastrianism, Vol. 1 (Handbuch der Orientalistik Series). Leiden: Brill; Repr. 1996 as A History of Zoroastrianism: Vol 1, The Early Period.
- 1977, Zoroastrianism: The rediscovery of missing chapters in man's religious history (Teaching aids for the study of Inner Asia). Asian Studies Research Institute: Indiana University Press.
- 1977, A Persian Stronghold of Zoroastrianism. London: Oxford University Press; Repr. 2001
- 1978, A Reader in Manichaean Middle Persian and Parthian (Acta Iranica Monograph Series). Leiden: Brill.
- 1979, Zoroastrians: Their Religious Beliefs and Practices (Library of religious beliefs and practices). London:Routledge/Kegan Paul; Corrected repr. 1984; repr. with new foreword 2001.
- 1982, A History of Zoroastrianism, Vol. 2 (Handbuch der Orientalistik Series). Leiden: Brill. Repr. 1996 as "A History of Zoroastrianism: Vol 2, Under the Achaemenians".
- 1984, Textual Sources for the Study of Zoroastrianism (Textual Sources for the Study of Religion). London:Rowman & Littlefield. Repr. 1990
- 1987, Zoroastrianism: A Shadowy but Powerful Presence in the Judaeo-Christian World. Friends of Dr. Williams: London.
- 1988, "The religion of Cyrus the Great", in A. Kuhrt and H. Sancisi-Weerdenburg Achaemenid History III: Method and Theory, Leiden: Brill.
- 1991, A History of Zoroastrianism: Vol. 3, Zoroastrianism Under Macedonian and Roman Rule (Handbuch der Orientalistik Series). With Frantz Grenet, Leiden: Brill.
- 1992, Zoroastrianism: Its Antiquity and Constant Vigour (Columbia Lectures on Iranian Studies, No 7). Costa Mesa: Mazda.
- Forthcoming: A History of Zoroastrianism: Vols 4–7, under the editorship of Albert de Jong.

== Sources ==
- A. D. H. Bivar, Professor Mary Boyce, The Times, 13 April 2006
- Albert de Jong, Professor Mary Boyce, The Independent, 28 April 2006
- Almut Hintze, Professor Mary Boyce, Daily Telegraph, 28 April 2006
- Parsi, Touradj (7 April 2006), "Remembering Mary Boyce", The Iranian
- International Committee: Mary Boyce, Encyclopædia Iranica.
