= Robert Charles Zaehner =

British academic on Eastern religions

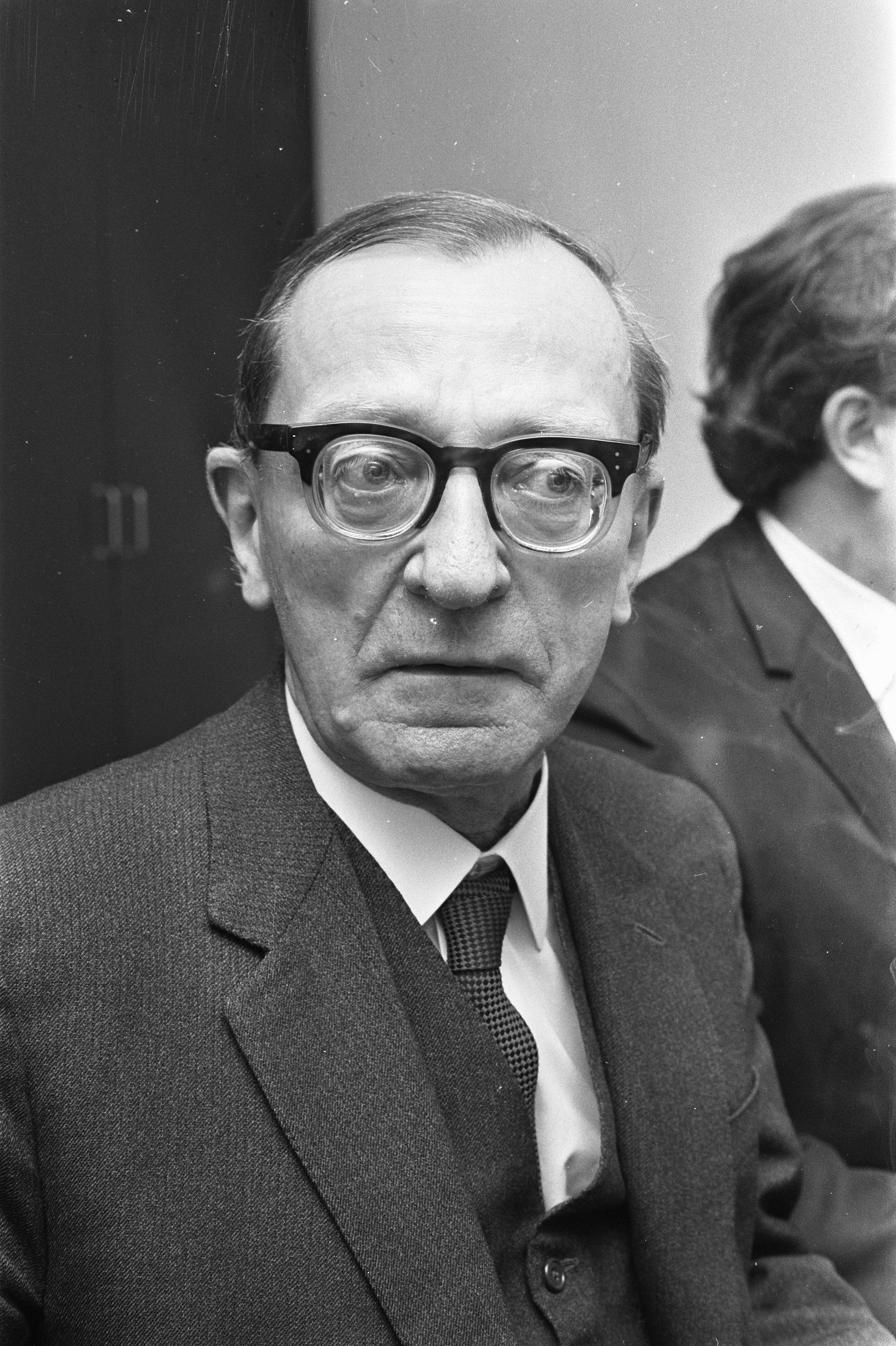
R. C. Zaehner (1972)

Robert Charles Zaehner (8 April 1913 – 24 November 1974) was a British academic whose field of study was Eastern religions. He understood the original languages of various sacred texts, including Middle Persian, Sanskrit, Pali, and Arabic. At Oxford University, his first writings were on the Zoroastrian religion and its texts. Starting in World War II, he served as an intelligence officer in Iran. Appointed Spalding Professor at Oxford in 1952, his books addressed such subjects as mystical experience (articulating a widely cited typology), Hinduism, comparative religion, Christianity and other religions, and ethics. He translated the Bhagavad Gita, providing an extensive commentary based on Hindu tradition and sources. His last books addressed similar popular culture issues, leading to his talks on the BBC. He published under the name R. C. Zaehner.

== Life and career ==
=== Early years ===
Born on 8 April 1913 in Sevenoaks, Kent, he was the son of Swiss–German immigrants to England. Zaehner "was bilingual in French and English from early childhood. He remained an excellent linguist all his life." Educated at the nearby Tonbridge School, he was admitted to Christ Church, Oxford, where he studied Greek and Latin as an undergraduate. It was during this time that he underwent a spontaneous mystical experience, detached of any religious content. He then went on to study ancient Persian including Avestan, gaining first class honours in Oriental Languages. During 1936–37 at Cambridge University he studied Pahlavi, another ancient Iranian language, with Sir Harold Bailey, whom Zaehner held in high esteem. He then began work on his book Zurvan, a Zoroastrian Dilemma, a study of the pre-Islamic religion of Iran.

Zaehner enjoyed "a prodigious gift for languages". He later acquired a reading knowledge of Sanskrit (for Hindu scriptures), Pali (for Buddhist), and Arabic (for Islamic). In 1939 he taught as a research lecturer at Christ Church, Oxford. During this period, he read the French poet Arthur Rimbaud, the Sufi poet Rumi, and the Hindu Upanishads. Zaehner came then to adopt a personal brand of "nature mysticism". Yet his spiritual progression led him a few years later to convert to Christianity, becoming a Roman Catholic while stationed in Iran.

=== British intelligence ===
During World War II starting in 1943, he served as a British intelligence officer at their Embassy in Tehran. Often he was stationed in the field among the mountain tribes of northern Iran. After the war he also performed a more diplomatic role at the Tehran embassy. Decades later another British intelligence officer, Peter Wright, described his activities:

"I studied Zaehner's Personal File. He was responsible for MI6 counterintelligence in Persia during the war. It was difficult and dangerous work. The railway lines into Russia, carrying vital military supplies, were key targets for German sabotage. Zaehner was perfectly equipped for the job, speaking the local dialects fluently, and much of his time was spent undercover, operating in the murky and cutthroat world of countersabotage. By the end of the war his task was even more fraught. The Russians themselves were trying to gain control of the railway, and Zaehner had to work behind Russian lines, continuously at risk of betrayal and murder by pro-German or pro-Russian... ."

Zaehner continued in Iran until 1947 as press attaché in the British Embassy, and as an MI6 officer. He then resumed his academic career at Oxford doing research on Zoroastrianism. During 1949, however, he was relocated to Malta where he trained anti-Communist Albanians. By 1950 he had secured an Oxford appointment as lecturer in Persian literature. Again in 1951–1952 he returned to Iran for government service. Prof. Nancy Lambton, who had run British propaganda in Iran during the war, recommended him for the Embassy position. Journalist Christopher de Bellaigue describes Robin Zaehner as "a born networker who knew everyone who mattered in Tehran" with a taste for gin and opium. "When Kingsley Martin, the editor of the New Statesman, asked Zaehner at a cocktail party in Tehran what book he might read to enlarge his understanding of Iran, Zaehner suggested Alice through the Looking Glass."

Zaehner publicly held the rank of Counsellor in the British Embassy in Tehran. In fact, he continued as an MI6 officer. During the Abadan Crisis he was assigned to prolong the Shah's royal hold on the Sun Throne against the republican challenge led by Mohammed Mossadegh, then the Prime Minister. The crisis involved the Anglo-Iranian Oil Company which had been in effect nationalised by Mossadegh. Zaehner thus became engaged in the failed 1951 British effort to topple the government of Iran and return oil production to that entity controlled by the British government. "[T]he plot to overthrow Mossadegh and give the oilfields back to the AIOC was in the hands of a British diplomat called Robin Zaehner, later professor of Eastern religions at Oxford." Such Anglo and later American interference in Iran, which eventually reinstalled the Shah, has been widely criticized.

In the 1960s, MI5 counterintelligence officer Peter Wright questioned Zaehner about floating allegations that he had doubled as a spy for the Soviet Union, harming British intelligence operations in Iran and Albania during the period following World War II. Zaehner is described as "a small, wiry-looking man, clothed in the distracted charm of erudition." In his 1987 book Spycatcher Wright wrote that Zaehner's humble demeanor and candid denial convinced him that the Oxford don had remained loyal to Britain. Wright notes that "I felt like a heel" for confronting Zaehner.

Although in the intelligence service for the benefit of his Government, on later reflection Zaehner did not understand the utilitarian activities he performed as being altogether ennobling. In such "Government service abroad", he wrote, "truth is seen as the last of the virtues and to lie comes to be a second nature. It was, then, with relief that I returned to academic life because, it seemed to me, if ever there was a profession concerned with a single-minded search for truth, it was the profession of the scholar." Prof. Jeffrey Kripal discusses "Zaehner's extraordinary truth telling" which may appear "politically incorrect". The "too truthful professor" might be seen as "a redemptive or compensatory act" for "his earlier career in dissimulation and deception" as a spy.

=== Oxford professor ===
Zaehner worked at the university until his death, aged 61, on 24 November 1974 in Oxford, when he collapsed in the street while walking on his way to Sunday evening mass. The cause of death was a heart attack.

==== University work ====
Before the war Zaehner had lectured at Oxford University. Returning to Christ Church several years after the war, he continued work on his Zurvan book, and lectured in Persian literature. His reputation then "rested on articles on Zoroastrianism, mainly philological" written before the war.

In 1952 Zaehner was elected Spalding Professor of Eastern Religions and Ethics to succeed the celebrated professor Sarvepalli Radhakrishnan, who had resigned to become vice-president (later President) of India. Zaehner had applied for this position. Radhakrishnan previously had been advancing a harmonizing viewpoint with regard to the study of comparative religions, and the academic chair had a subtext of being "founded to propagate a kind of universalism". Zaehner's inaugural lecture was unconventional in content. He delivered a strong yet witty criticism of "universalism" in religion.

It drew controversy. Prof. Michael Dummett opines that what concerned Zaehner was "to make it clear from the start of his tenure of the Chair that he was nobody else's man." Zaehner continued an interest in Zoroastrian studies, publishing his Zurvan book and two others on the subject during the 1950s. Since 1952, however, he had turned his primary attention further East. "After my election to the Spalding Chair, I decided to devote myself mainly to the study of Indian religions in accordance with the founder's wishes." He served Oxford in this academic chair, while also a fellow at All Souls College, until his death in 1974, and never married.

In his influential 1957 book Mysticism Sacred and Profane, Zaehner discussed this traditional, cross-cultural spiritual practice. Based on mystical writings, he offered an innovative typology that became widely discussed in academic journals. He also analyzed claims that mescalin use fit into this spiritual quest. His conclusion was near dismissive. Yet he revisited his harsh words on the naïveté of drug mysticism in his 1972 book Zen, Drugs and Mysticism. His warnings became somewhat qualified by some prudent suggestions. He carefully distinguished between drug-induced states and religious mysticism. Then the BBC began asking him to talk on the radio, where he acquired a following. He was invited abroad to lecture.

His delivery in Scotland of the Gifford Lectures led him to write perhaps his most magisterial book. Zaehner traveled twice to the University of St. Andrews during the years 1967 to 1969. The subject he choose concerned the convoluted and intertwined history of the different world religions during the long duration of their mutual co-existence. He described the interactions as both fiercely contested and relatively cross-cultivating, in contrast to other periods of a more sovereign isolation. The lectures were later published in 1970 "just four years before his death" by Oxford University as Concordant Discord. The interdependence of faiths.

==== Peer descriptions ====
As a professor Zaehner "had a great facility for writing, and an enormous appetite for work… [also] a talent for friendship, a deep affection for a number of particular close friends and an appreciation of human personality, especially for anything bizarre or eccentric". Nonetheless, "he passed a great deal of his time alone, most of it in his study working."

An American professor described Zaehner in a different light: "The small, birdlike Zaehner, whose rheumy, color-faded eyes darted about in a clay colored face, misted blue from the smoke of Gauloises cigarettes, could be fearsome indeed. He was a volatile figure, worthy of the best steel of his age."

His colleague in Iran, Prof. Ann K. S. Lambton of SOAS, recalled, "He did not, perhaps, suffer fools gladly, but for the serious student he would take immense pains". Prof. Zaehner was "an entertaining companion" with "many wildly funny" stories, "a man of great originality, not to say eccentricity."

"Zaehner was a scholar who turned into something different, something more important than a scholar," according to Michael Dummett, a professor of philosophy at Oxford, who wanted to call him a penseur [French: a thinker]. With insight and learning (and his war-time experience) Zaehner shed light on key issues in contemporary spiritual life, writing abundantly. "His talent lay in seeing what to ask, rather than in how to answer... ."

About Zaehner's writing style, Wilfred Cantwell Smith compared it to a merry-go-round, so that the reader is not sure he is "actually going somewhere. A merry-go-round of such engaging colour, boisterous sound effects, and bouncing intellectual activity, however, is itself perhaps no mean achievement."

In theology he challenged the ecumenical trend that strove to somehow see a uniformity in all religions. He acted not out of an ill will, but from a conviction that any fruitful dialogue between religions must be based on a "pursuit of truth". If such profound dialogue rested on a false or a superficial "harmony and friendship" it would only foster hidden misunderstandings, Zaehner thought, which would ultimately result in a deepening mistrust.

== His writings ==
=== Zoroastrian studies ===
==== Zurvan ====
Initially Zaehner's reputation rested on his studies of Zoroastrianism, at first articles mostly on philology in academic journals. He labored for many years on a scholarly work, his Zurvan, a Zoroastrian dilemma (1955). This book provides an original discussions of an influential theological deviation from the Zoroastrian orthodoxy of ancient Persia's Achaemenid Empire, which was a stark, ethical dualism. Zurvanism was promoted by the Sasanian Empire (224–651) which arose later during Roman times. Until the Muslim conquest, Zurvanism in the Persian world became established and disestablished by turns.

Zurvan was an innovation analogous to Zoroastrian original doctrine. The prophet Zoroaster preached that the benevolent Ahura Mazda (the "Wise Lord"), as the creator God, fashioned both Spenta Mainyu (the Holy Spirit), and Angra Mainyu (the Aggressive Spirit) who chose to turn evil. These two created Spirits were called twins, one good, one evil. Over the centuries Ahura Mazda and his "messenger" the good Spenta Mainyu became conflated and identified; hence, the creator Ahura Mazda began to be seen as the twin of the evil Angra Mainyu, where Ahura Mazda was later known as Ohrmazd, and Angra Mainyu became Ahriman. It was in this guise that Zoroastrianism became the state religion in Achaemenid Persia. Without fully abandoning dualism, some started to consider Zurvan (Time) as the underlying cause of both the benevolent Ahura Mazda and the evil Angra Mainyu. The picture is complicated by very different schools of Zurvanism, and contesting Zoroastrian sects.

Zurvan could be described as divinized Time (Zaman). With Time as 'father' twins came into being: the ethical, bountiful Ohrmazd, who was worshipped, and his satanic antagonist Ahriman, against whom believers fought. As Infinite Time, Zurvan rose supreme "above Ohrmazd and Ahriman" and stood "above good and evil". This aggravated the traditional 'orthodox' Zoroastrians (the Mazdean ethical dualists). Zoroastrian cosmology understood that "finite Time comes into existence out of Infinite Time". During the 12,000 year period of finite Time (Zurvan being both kinds of Time), human history occurs, the fight against Ahriman starts, and the final victory of Ohrmazd is achieved. Yet throughout, orthodox Mazdeans insisted, it is Ohrmazd who remains supreme, not Zurvan. On the other hand, his adherents held that Zurvan was God of Time, Space, Wisdom, and Power, and the Lord of Death, of Order, and of Fate.

==== Teachings of the Magi ====
The Teachings of the Magi (1956) was Zaehner's second of three book on Zoroastrianism. It presented the "main tenets" of the religion in the Sasanid era, during the reign of Shapur II, a 4th-century King. Its chief sources were Pahlavi books written a few centuries later by Zoroastrians. Each of its ten chapters contains Zaehner's descriptive commentaries, illustrated by his translations from historic texts. Chapter IV, "The Necessity of Dualism" is typical, half being the author's narrative and half extracts from a Pahlavi work, here the Shikand Gumani Vazar by Mardan Farrukh.

==== Dawn and Twilight ====
In his The Dawn and Twilight of Zoroastrianism (1961), Zaehner adopted a chronological dichotomy. He first explores origins, the founding of the religion by its prophet Zoroaster. He notes that the Gathas, the earliest texts in the Avesta, make it obvious that "Zoroaster met with very stiff opposition from the civil and ecclesiastical authorities when once he had proclaimed his mission." "His enemies... supported the ancient national religion." On moral and ecological grounds, Zoroaster favored the "settled pastoral and agricultural community" as against the "predatory, marauding tribal societies". His theological and ethical dualism advocated for "the followers of Truth the life-conserving and life-enhancing forces" and against the "destructive forces" of the Lie. For the dates of the prophet's life, Zaehner adopted the traditional 6th century BCE dates.

Zoroaster reformed the old polytheistic religion by making Ahura Mazdah [the Wise Lord] the Creator, the only God. An innovation by Zoroaster was the abstract notions, namely, the Holy Spirit, and the Amesha Spentas (Good Mind, Truth, Devotion, Dominion, Wholeness, Immortality). Zaehner interpreted them not as new substitutes for the excluded old gods, "but as part of the divine personality itself" which may also serve "as mediating functions between God and man". The Amesha Spentas are "aspects of God, but aspects in which man too can share." Angra Mainyu was the dualistic evil. Dating to before the final parting of ways of the Indo-Iranians, the Hindus had two classes of gods, the asuras (e.g., Varuna) and the devas (e.g., Indra). Later following the invasion of India the asuras sank to the rank of demon. Au contraire, in Iran the ahuras were favored, while the daevas fell and opposed truth, spurred in part by Zoroaster's reform. In the old Iranian religion, an ahura [lord] was concerned with "the right ordering of the cosmos".

In Part II, Zaehner discussed the long decline of Zoroastrianism. There arose the teachings about Zurvan i Akanarak [Infinite Time]. The Sasanid state's ideological rationale was sourced in Zoroastrian cosmology and sense of virtue. The Amesha Spentas provided spiritual support for human activities according to an articulated mean (e.g., "the just equipoise between excess and deficiency", Zoroastrian "law", and "wisdom or reason"). As an ethical principle the mean followed the contours of the 'treaty' between Ohrmazd [Ahura Mazda] and Ahriman [Angra Mainyu], which governed their struggle in Finite Time. Other doctrines came into prominence, such as those about the future saviour Saoshyant (Zoroaster himself or his posthumous son). Then after the final triumph of the Good Religion the wise lord Orhmazd "elevates the whole material creation into the spiritual order, and there the perfection that each created thing has as it issues from the hand of God is restored to it" in the Frashkart or "Making Excellent".

==== Articles, chapters ====
Zaehner contributed other work regarding Zoroaster and the religion began in ancient Iran. The article "Zoroastrianism" was included in a double-columned book he edited, The Concise Encyclopedia of Living Faiths, first published in 1959. Also were his several articles on the persistence in popular culture of the former national religion, "Zoroastrian survivals in Iranian folklore". Chapters, in whole or part, on Zoroastrianism appeared in a few of his other books: At Sundry Times (1958), aka The Comparison of Religions (1962); The Convergent Spirit, aka Matter and Spirit (1963); and Concordant Discord (1970).

=== Comparative religion ===
In addition to the two titles below, other works of Zaehner are comparative or have a significant comparative element. Among these are: Concordant Discord (1970), and Our Savage God (1974).

==== Choice of perspective ====
In the west the academic field of comparative religion at its origins inherited an 'enlightenment' ideal of an objective, value-neutral, yet 'secular' rationalism. Traditional Christian and Jewish writings, however, initially provided much of the source material, as did classical literature, these being later joined by non-western religious texts and field studies, then eventually by ethnological studies of folk religions. The privileged 'enlightenment' orientation, self-defined as purely reasonable, in practice fell short of being neutral, and itself became progressively contested by different camps. As to value-neutral criteria, Zaehner situated himself roughly as follows:

"Any man with any convictions at all is liable to be influenced by them even when he tries to adopt an entirely objective approach; but let him recognize this from the outset and guard against it. If he does this, he will at least be less liable to deceive himself and others." "Of the books I have written some are intended to be objective; others, quite frankly, are not." "In all my writings on comparative religion my aim has been increasingly to show that there is a coherent pattern in religious history. For me the centre of coherence can only be Christ." Yet "I have rejected as irrelevant to my theme almost everything that would find a natural place in a theological seminary, that is, Christian theology, modern theology in particular." "For what, then, do I have sympathy, you may well ask. Quite simply, for the 'great religions' both of East and West, expressed... in those texts that each religion holds most sacred and in the impact that these have caused."

Accordingly, for his primary orientation Zaehner chose from among the active participants: Christianity in its Catholic manifestation. Yet the academic Zaehner also employed a type of comparative analysis, e.g., often drawing on Zoroastrian or Hindu, or Jewish or Islamic views for contrast, for insight. Often he combined comparison with a default 'modernist' critique, which included psychology or cultural evolution. Zaehner's later works are informed by Vatican II (1962-1965) and tempered by Nostra aetate.

Pursuit of his chosen point of view was not without criticism, including from other academics. Nor did Zaehner's Christian belief prevent him from disclosing his own troubles and truth-be-told criticism of disasters in the historical church.

==== At Sundry Times ====
In his 1958 book At Sundry Times. An essay in the comparison of religions, Zaehner came to grips with "the problem of how a Christian should regard the non-Christian religions and how, if at all, he could correlate them into his own" (p. 9 [Preface]). It includes an Introduction (1), followed by chapters on Hinduism (2), on Hinduism and Buddhism (3), on "Prophets outside Israel", i.e., Zoroastrianism and Islam (4), and it concludes with Appendix which compares and contrasts the "Quran and Christ". Perhaps the key chapter is "Consummatum Est" (5), which "shows, or tries to show, how the main trend in [mystical] Hinduism and Buddhism on the one hand and of [the prophetic] Zoroastrianism on the other meet and complete each other in the Christian revelation" (Preface, p. 9, words in brackets added).

The book opens with a lucid statement of his own contested hermeneutic: "with comparative religion," he says, "the question is who's to be master, that's all" (p. 9). He starts by saluting E. O. James. Next Zaehner mentions Rudolph Otto (1869-1937) and al-Ghazali (1058-1111) as both being skeptics about any 'reasonable' writer with no religious experience who expounds on the subject. Here Zaehner acknowledges that many Christians may only be familiar with their own type of religion (similar to Judaism and Islam), and hence be ill-equipped to adequately comprehend Hindu or Buddhist mysticism (pp. 12–15).

Zaehner then compared the Old Testament and the Buddha, the former being a history of God's commandments delivered by his prophets to the Jewish people and their struggle to live accordingly, and the later being a teacher of a path derived from his own experience, which leads to a spiritual enlightenment without God and apart from historical events (pp. 15–19, 24–26). Needed is a way to bridge this gap between these two (pp. 15, 19, 26, 28). The gap is further illustrated as it relates to desire and suffering (p. 21), body and soul (pp. 22–23), personality and death (pp. 23–24). He announced a 'method' special to the book: "I shall concern myself with what sincere men have believed" (p. 29).

==== Christianity & other Religions ====
The 1964 book, following its introduction, has four parts: India, China and Japan, Islam, and The Catholic Church. Throughout Zaehner offers connections between the self-understanding of 'other religions' and that of the Judeo-Christian, e.g., the Upanishads and Thomas Merton (pp. 25–26), Taoism and Adam (p. 68), Sunyata and Plato (p. 96), Al-Ghazali and St. Paul (p. 119-120), Samkhya and Martin Buber (pp. 131–132).

In the introduction, Zaehner laments the "very checkered history" of the Church. Yet he expresses his admiration of Pope John (1881-1963), who advanced the dignity that all humanity possesses "in the sight of God". Zaehner then presents a brief history of Christianity in world context. The Church "rejoiced to build into herself whatever in Paganism she found compatible" with the revelation and ministry of Jesus. Her confidence was inferred in the words of Gamaliel (pp. 7–9). While Europe has known of Jesus for twenty centuries, 'further' Asia has only for three. Jesus, however, seemed to have arrived there with conquerors from across the sea, and "not as the suffering servant" (p. 9). As to the ancient traditions of Asia, Christians did "condemn outright what [they had] not first learnt to understand" (pp. 11, 13). Zaehner thus sets the stage for a modern review of ancient traditions.

"The Catholic Church" chapter starts by celebrating its inclusiveness. Zaehner quotes Cardinal Newman praising the early Church's absorption of classical Mediterranean virtues (a source some term 'heathen'). For "from the beginning the Moral Governor of the world has scattered the seeds of truth far and wide... ." There may be some danger for Christians to study the spiritual truths of other religions, but it is found in scripture.

Zaehner counsels that the reader not "neglect the witness" of Hinduism and Buddhism, as they teach inner truths which, among Christians, have withered and faded since the one-sided Reformation. The Church perpetually struggles to keep to a "perfect yet precarious balance between the transcendent... Judge and King and the indwelling Christ". Writing in 1964, Zaehner perceived "a change for the better" in the increasing acceptance of the "Yogin in India or Zen in Japan". Nonetheless, a danger exists for the 'unwary soul' who in exploring other religions may pass beyond the fear of God. Then one may enter the subtleties of mystical experience, and "mistake his own soul for God." Such an error in distinguishing between timeless states can lead to ego inflation, spiritual vanity, and barrenness.

Zaehner offers this categorical analysis of some major religious affiliations: a) action-oriented, worldly (Judaism, Islam, Protestantism, Confucianism); b) contemplation-oriented, other-worldly (Hinduism, Theravada Buddhism, Taoism); c) in-between (Mahayana Buddhism, neo-Confucianism, the reformed Hinduism of Gandhi, the Catholic Church).

=== Mystical experience ===
Mysticism as an academic field of study is relatively recent, emerging from earlier works with a religious and literary accent. From reading the writings of mystics, various traditional distinctions have been further elaborated, such as its psychological nature and its social-cultural context. Discussions have also articulated its phenomenology as a personal experience versus how it has been interpreted by the mystic or by others. Zaehner made his contributions, e.g., to its comparative analysis and its typology.

==== Sacred and Profane ====
After Zaehner's initial works on Zoroastrianism, Mysticism. Sacred and Profane (1957) was his first published on another subject. It followed his assumption of the Spalding chair at All Souls College, Oxford. The book's conversational style delivers clarity and wisdom on a difficult subject, and along the way are found many illuminating digressions and asides.

The profane side is first addressed with regard to the use of mescaline. Zaehner himself carefully took this natural psychedelic drug. He discussed in particular Aldous Huxley, especially in his popular 1954 book The Doors of Perception (pp. 1–29, 208–226). Next, the subject of nature mystics is described and appraised, including two examples from literature: Proust and Rimbaud (pp. 30–83). 'Madness', it is also pointed out, may sometimes result in mental states that accord with those of the mystics (p. 84-105).

A chapter "Integration and isolation" takes a comparative view, discussing mystics of Hinduism, Christianity, and Islam, as well as Jung's psychology. Integration is described as nature mysticism joined to the intellect, whereby reason and the unconscious nourish one another (p. 114). Isolation refers to Samkhya mysticism, whereby the purusa (the soul) and prakrti (nature) are separated (p. 106-128). About the Hindu mystics, Zaehner contrasts Samkhya, a dualist doctrine associated with the Yoga method, and non-dualist Vedanta, a monism inspired by the Upanishads. The relative merits of Monism verses Theism, and vice versa, are discussed (pp. 153–197). Near the end of his conclusion, Zaehner repeats his view that the monist and the theistic are "distinct and mutually opposed types of mysticism" (p. 204).

==== Hindu and Muslim ====
His innovative 1960 book compares the mystical literature and practice of Hindus and Muslims. He frames it with a theme of diversity. On experiential foundations, Zaehner then commences to explore the spiritual treasures left to us by the mystics of the Sanātana Dharma, and of the Sufi tariqas. Often he offers a phenomenological description of the reported experiences, after which he interprets them in various theological terms.

Following Surendranath N. Dasgupta, Zaehner describes five different types of mysticism to be found in Indian tradition: "the sacrificial, the Upanishadic, the Yogic, the Buddhistic, and that of bhakti." Zaehner leaves aside the 'sacrificial' (as being primarily of historic interest), and the 'Buddhist' (due to contested definitions of nirvana), so that as exemplars of mystical experience he presents:

- (a) the Upanishadic "I am this All" which can be subdivided into (i) a theistic interpretation or (ii) a monistic;
- (b) the Yogic "unity" outside space and time, either (i) of the eternal monad of the mystic's own individual soul per the Yoga Sutras of Patanjali or (ii) of Brahman, the ground of the universe, per the advaita Vedanta of Sankara; and,
- (c) the Bhakti mysticism of love, according to the commentary on the Bhagavad Gita by Ramanuja.

Based on the above schematic, the resulting study of the mystics of the two religions is somewhat asymmetrical. Zaehner chose to treat initially Hindu mystics, because of their relative freedom from creed or dogma. The mystics and sufis of Islam selected are from all over the Islamic world, e.g., Junayd of Baghdad, and Al-Ghazali. Included are mystics from the Mughal era. Both Hindu and Muslim are given careful scrutiny, Zaehner discussing their insight into mystical experience.

==== Comparative mysticism ====
In his work on comparative religion, Zaehner directly addressed mysticism, particularly in Hinduism, Christianity, and Islam. He criticized the then widely-held view that in mystical experience was to be found the key to the unity of all religions. He based his contrary views on well-known texts authored by the mystics of various traditions. Zaehner, after describing their first-hand reports of experiences of extraordinary states of consciousness, presented also their traditional interpretations. The result seems to indicate a great variety of mystical experience, and clear differences in how these were understood theologically. Many experiences seems to evidence a particular world view, e.g., theisms, monisms, dualisms, pantheisms, or agnostic.

His critique challenged the thesis of Richard Bucke, developed in his 1901 book, Cosmic Consciousness. Bucke describes certain lesser facilities, followed by accounts of the prized 'cosmic' state of mind. Fourteen exemplary people of history as presented, shown as each reaching a somewhat similar realization: the plane of cosmic consciousness. This idea, called the Perennial philosophy, has been variously advanced, e.g., by Aldous Huxley, by Frithjof Schuon, by Houston Smith. Zaehner does not dispute that these spiritual visionaries reach a distinguishable level of awareness. Nor does he deny that by following a disciplined life sequence over time one may be led to mystical experience: withdrawal, purgation, illumination. Instead, what Zaeher suggests is a profound difference between, e.g., the pantheistic vision of a nature mystic, admittedly pleasant and wholesome, and the personal union of a theist with the Divine lover of humankind.

==== Gender: Soul & Spirit ====
Zaehner's study of mystical writings also incorporated its psychological dimensions, yet as a supplement, not as definitive. About the experience of unusual states of consciousness, many mystics have written using as a descriptive metaphor language associated with marriage symbolism or sexuality.

Abrahamic religions traditionally identify the gender of the supreme Being as male. In Islam and in Christianity, the soul of the often male sufi or mystic, following his spiritual discipline, may encounter the holy presence of the male Deity. The Christian Church as a whole, as a community of souls, for millennia has been self-described as the Bride of Christ.

Across centuries and continents, mystics have used erotic metaphors and sexual analogies in descriptions of Divine love. The special states of consciousness they recorded have become the subject of modern psychological studies, e.g., by the school of C. G. Jung (often favored by Zaehner). Among Christian mystics Teresa de Jesús (1515-1582) employed the spiritual marriage metaphor in writing about her experiences. Mechthild von Magdeburg (c.1208-1282/1294) provides a special example of the woman mystic.

Along with other authors, Zaehner writes of the mystics' marriage symbolism and erotic imagery. He quotes an exemplary passage of François de Sales (1567-1622), then continues:

"Both in mystical rapture and in sexual union reason and intelligence are momentarily set at naught. The soul 'flows' and 'hurls itself out of itself'. ...all consciousness of the ego has disappeared. As the Buddhist would say, there is no longer any 'I' or 'mine', the ego has been swallowed up into a greater whole."

Yet, when approaching this delicate subject, especially at the chaotic threshold to a New Age, the rapid changes afoot may confound sex talk and conflate opposites, which elicits diverse commentary. Regarding the transcultural experience of mystical states, however, the traditional analogy of marriage symbolism continues to endure, drawing interest and advocates. Augmenting the above examples is the Dutch mystic Jan van Ruusbroec (1239-1381).

Zaehner evolved into a committed Christian, whose ethics and morals were founded on his Catholic faith. Accordingly, sexuality is blessed within the context of marriage. His sexual orientation before and during World War II was said to have been homosexual. During his later life, while a don at Oxford, he became wholly devoted to teaching, research and writing; he abstained from sexual activity.

=== Typology of mysticism ===
In 1958, Zaehner presented a general analysis of the range of mystical experience in the form of a typology. Dasgupta was a source, which Zaehner modified, truncated and refashioned. The resulting schema of the typology aimed to reflect both the mystic's report of the experience itself and the mystic's personal 'explanation' of it. Commentaries by others found in traditional spiritual literature (spanning centuries) were also referenced. The 'explanations' usually drew the mystic's religious heritage. Of the various typologies suggested by Zaehner, the following has been selected here.

- (1) Nature mystics, e.g., secular 'oceanic';
- (2) Isolation, interpreted as either:
  - Dualist, e.g., Samkhya-Yogin, or
  - Monistic, e.g., non-dualist Vedanta;
- (3) Theistic, e.g., Abrahamic religions.

An endemic problem with such an analytic typology is the elusive nature of the conscious experience during the mystical state, its shifting linguistic descriptions and perspectives of subject/object, and the psychology of spiritual awareness itself. In addition, each type category is hardly pure, in that there is a great variety of overlap between them. Furthermore, each religion appears to field contending schools of mystical thought, and often interpretations of subtle conscious states may differ within each of the schools. When a list of the several proposed typologies suggested by Zaehner over the years are mustered and compared, Fernandes found the results "unstable". Accordingly, an observer might conclude that the spiritual map of possible mysticisms would present a confused jumble through which snake perplexing pathways, difficult of analysis. Zaehner's proposals suffer from such endemic difficulties.

Nota bene: Kripal remarks that Zaehner is known for a "tripartite typology of mystical states". However here four types are discussed. Zaehner's "Isolation" composite is divided in its two components: the Dualist, and the Monistic. These two types may be deemed functionally equivalent, yet as self-defined the Monistic experience (of Vedanta) is not an isolated event but instead is connected to the cosmic unity.

==== Nature mysticism ====
Nature mysticism is a term used to catalogue generally those spontaneous experiences of an oceanic feeling in which a person identifies with nature, or is similarly thrown back in awe of the unforgettable, vast sweep of the cosmos. Such may be described philosophically as a form of pantheism, or often as pan-en-hen-ic. Nature mysicism may also include such a state of consciousness induced by drugs. Like Aldous Huxley he had taken mescalin, but Zaehner came to a different conclusion. In his 1957 book Mysticism. Sacred and Profane. An Inquiry into some Varieties of Praeternatural Experience, there is a narrative description of the author's experience under the influence of mescalin.

In part, about nature mysticism, Zaehner relies on William James, Carl Jung, a personal experience recorded by Martin Buber, the descriptions of Marcel Proust and of Arthur Rimbaud, among others. and writings of Richard Jeffries and of Richard Maurice Bucke, The Hindu Upanishads were viewed by Zaehner as "a genuine bridge" between nature mysticism and theistic mysticism.

A primary aims of Zaehner appeared to be making the distinction between a morally open experience found in nature mysticism as contrasted with the beatific vision of the theist. Zaehner set himself against Aldous Huxley's style of the Perennial Philosophy which held as uniform all mystical experience. Accordingly, he understood Huxley's interpretation of 'nature mysticism' as naïve, self-referent, and inflated, an idea seeded with future misunderstandings. Yet, considering Huxley's conversion to Vedanta and to his immersion in Zen, Zaehner arrived at an appraisal of Huxley that was nuanced, and selectively in accord.

==== Dualism, e.g., Samkhya ====
Samkhya philosophy is an ancient dualist doctrine of India. In appraising the experienced world, Samkhya understood it as composed largely of prakrti (nature, mostly unconscious exterior matter, but also inner elements of human life not immortal), and purusa (the human soul aware). Its dualism generally contrasts the 'objectively' seen (prakriti) and the subjective seer (purusa). Long ago Yoga adherents adopted doctrines of Samkhya. As a person pursues his spiritual quest under Samkhya-yoga, his immortal soul (purusa) emerges, becomes more and more defined and distinct, as it separates from entangling nature (prakriti). Prakriti includes even the nature affecting personal qualities, such as the three gunas (modes), the buddhi (universal intellect), the mind (manas), the body, the ahamkara (the ego): all of which the purusa sheds. Of the resulting refined and purified purusa there is yielded the eternity of the yogin's true Self in isolation.

An advanced mystic may attain a recurrent state of tranquil, steady illumination in meditative isolation. The Samkhya understands this as the benign emergence within the practicing yogin of his own purified, immortal purusa. A plurality of purusas exist, as many as there are people. A mystic's own purusa generally is about identical to the many other isolated purusas, each separately experienced from within, by millions of other humans. Under the Samkhya, Hindus may refer to this personal, isolated experience of immortality as the purified self, the purusa, or otherwise called the personal atman (Sanskrit: self). Au contraire, a Hindu mystic following a rival school of Vedanta may understand the same tranquil, steady illumination differently (i.e., as not Samkhya's purusa). As Zaehner proposed: the same or similar mystical experience may result in very different theological interpretations.

Instead of the isolated purusa experience of Samkhya, the Advaita Vedanta mystic might interpret it as the experience of the Self, which illuminates the mystic's direct connection to the all-inclusive entity of cosmic totality. Such a numinous, universal Self is called Brahman (Sanskrit: sacred power), or Paramatma. Here, the Samkhya understands an isolated, purified, eternal purusa (self); the contrary Vedanta mystic would experience an illuminating connection to the cosmic Brahman.

Hence, the mystical experience (briefly outlined here) is differently interpreted. The subject: (1) may achieve, by separation from prakriti (nature), the goal of immortality of her purusa, purified in isolation within herself; or (2) may become absorbed by discovery of her direct identity with the divine, immortal, luminous Brahman. Accordingly, in Zaehner's terms, such experience may be either (1) a dualistic Samkhya atheism, or (2) a monistic type of Advaita Vedanta. Neither for Zaehner can be called theistic, i.e., in neither case is there an interactive, sacred experience with a numinous personality.

==== Monism, e.g., Vedanta ====
In non-dualist Vedanta, the Hindu mystic would understand reality as nothing but the Divine Unity, inclusive of the mystic subject herself. A special, awesome, impersonal Presence may be experienced as universal totality. The persistent Hindu, after years of prescriptive discipline to purge her soul, may discover an inner stream of Being, the Brahman, in which she herself is encompassed like wet in the sea. Such a transformative consciousness of spiritual energy emits eternities of bliss.

What is called 'nature' (prakriti in Samkhya), philosophically, does not exist, according to the Advaita Vedanta of Sankara (c. 7th century). The objective 'other' is ultimately an illusion or maya. A realized person's antaratma or inner self is directly identical with the paramatma, the Supreme Soul or Brahman. As the Upanishads state to the seeker, "thou art that", Tat Tvam Asi, i.e., the personal atma is the divine Atma. What Samkhya darsana mistakes for an isolated purusa (self) is really the Brahman: the whole of the universe; all else is illusion. Brahma is being, consciousness, bliss.

Zaehner's typology often focused for comparative articulation on some Hindu forms of mysticism, i.e., the Astika of the dualist Samkhya and of the non-dualist Vedanta, and Sankara versus Ramanuja distinctions. Not addressed independently in this context were other forms of mysticism, e.g., the Theravada, the Mahayana, Chan Buddhism.

The non-dualist finds a complete unity within a subjective sovereignty: ultimately absorption in a numinous presence, the absolute. Constituted is a meditative perception of an all-encompassing "we" absent any hint of "they". Au contraire the Samkhya dualist understands that in his transcendent meditation he will begin to perceive his own emergent Self as an isolated purusa, in process of being purified from enmeshment in a nonetheless existing 'objective' prakrti. Despite the profound difference, Zaehner understands each as in some sense acquired in isolation. The two direct mystical experiences as found in Hindu literature Zaehner endeavors to present competently, as well as to introduce the framing theological filters used for explanation.

==== Theism, e.g., Christian ====
Theistic mysticism is common to Judaism, Christianity and Islam. Hinduism also includes its own traditions of theistic worship with a mystical dimension. Ramanuja (11th-12th century) articulated this theological schema, Vishishtadvaita, which departs from the Advaita Vedanta of Sankara (see above section).

According to Zaehner, Christianity and theistic religions offer the possibility of a sacred mystical union with an attentive creator God, whereas a strictly monistic approach instead leads to the self-unity experience of natural religion. Yet Zaehner remained hopeful in the long run of an ever-increasing understanding between religions. "We have much to learn from Eastern religions, and we have much too to give them; but we are always in danger of forgetting the art of giving--of giving without strings... ."

Mystical union between the mystic and the Deity in a sense confounds the distinction between dualistic and monistic mysticism. For if the two are identical already, there is no potential for the act of union. Yet the act of divine union also negates a continuous dualism.

During the 1940s spent in Iran he returned to the Christian faith. Decades later he published The Catholic Church and World Religions (1964), expressly from that perspective. As an objective scholar, he drew on his acquired insights from this source to further his understanding of others. Zaehner "did not choose to write to convince others of the truth of his own faith," rather "to frame questions" was his usual purpose.

=== Hindu studies ===
His translations and the Hinduism book "made Zaehner one of the most important modern exponents of Hindu theological and philosophical doctrines... . The works on mysticism are more controversial though they established important distinctions in refusing to regard all mysticisms as the same," wrote Prof. Geoffrey Parrinder. For Zaehner's Hindu and Muslim Mysticism (1960), and like analyses, see "Comparative Mysticism" section.

==== Hinduism ====
While an undergraduate at Christ Church in Oxford, Zaehner studied several Persian languages. He also taught himself a related language, Sanskrit, used to write the early Hindu sacred books. Decades later he was asked by OUP to author a volume on Hinduism. Unexpectedly Zaehner insisted on first reading in Sanscrit the Mahabharata, a very long epic. More than an heroic age story of an ancient war, the Mahabharata gives us the foremost compendium on Hindu religion and way of life.

The resulting treatise Hinduism (1962) is elegant, deep, and short. Zaehner discusses, among other things, the subtleties of dharma, and Yudhishthira, the son of Dharma, who became the King of righteousness (dharma raja). Yudhishthira is the elder of five brothers of the royal Pandava family, who leads one side in the war of the Mahabharata. Accordingly, he struggles to follow his conscience, to do the right thing, to avoid slaughter and bloodshed. Yet he finds that tradition and custom, and the Lord Krishna, are ready to allow the usual killing and mayhem of warfare.

As explained in Hinduism, all his life Yudhishthira struggles to follow his conscience. Yet when Yudhishthira participates in the battle of Kuruksetra, he is told by Krishna to state a "half truth" meant to deceive. Zaehner discusses: Yudhishthira and moksha (liberation), and karma; and Yudhishthira's troubles with warrior caste dharma. In the last chapter, Yudhishthira 'returns' as Mahatma Gandhi. Other chapters discuss the early literature of the Vedas, the deities, Bhakti devotional practices begun in medieval India, and the encounter with, and response to, modern Europeans.

==== Yudhishthira ====
Zaehner continued his discussion of Yudhishthira in a chapter from his Gifford Lectures. Analogies appear to connect the Mahabharata's Yudhishthira and the biblical Job. Yet their situations differed. Yudhishthira, although ascetic by nature, was a royal leader who had to directly face the conflicts of his society. His realm and his family suffered great misfortunes due to political conflict and war. Yet the divine Krishna evidently considered the war and the destructive duties of the warrior (the kshatriya dharma) acceptable. The wealthy householder Job, a faithful servant of his Deity, suffers severe family and personal reversals, due to Divine acquiescence. Each human being, both Job and Yudhishthira, is committed to following his righteous duty, acting in conformity to his conscience.

When the family advisor Vidura reluctantly challenges him to play dice at Dhrtarastra's palace, "Yudhishthira believes it is against his moral code to decline a challenge." Despite, or because of, his devotion to the law of dharma, Yudhishthira then "allowed himself be tricked into a game of dice." In contesting against very cunning and clever players, he gambles "his kingdom and family away." His wife becomes threatened with slavery.

Even so, initially Yudhishthira with "holy indifference" tries to "defend traditional dharma" and like Job to "justify the ways of God in the eyes of men." Yet his disgraced wife Draupadi dramatically attacks Krishna for "playing with his creatures as children play with dolls." Although his wife escapes slavery, the bitter loss in the dice game is only a step in the sequence of seemingly divinely-directed events that led to a disastrous war, involving enormous slaughter. Although Yudhishthira is the King of Dharma, eventually he harshly criticizes the bloody duties of a warrior (the caste dharma of the kshatriya), duties imposed also on kings. Yudhishthira himself prefers the "constant virtues" mandated by the dharma of a brahmin. "Krishna represents the old order," interprets Zaehner, where "trickery and violence" hold "an honorable place".

==== Translations ====
In his Hindu Scriptures (1966) Zaehner translates ancient sacred texts, his selections of the Rig-Veda, the Atharva-Veda, the Upanishads, and the entire, 80-page Bhagavad Gita. He discusses these writings in his short Introduction. A brief Glossary of Names is at the end. "Zaehner's extraordinary command of the texts" was widely admired by his academic peers.

That year Zaehner also published an extensively annotated Bhagavad Gita. which is a prized and celebrated episode of the Mahabharata epic. Before the great battle, the Lord Krishna discusses with the Pandava brother Arjuna the enduring spiritual realities and the duties of his caste dharma. Krishna "was not merely a local prince of no very great importance: he was God incarnate--the great God Vishnu who has taken on human flesh and blood." After his translation, Zaehner provides a long Commentary, which is informed by: the medieval sages Sankara and Ramanuja, ancient scriptures and epics, and modern scholarship. His Introduction places the Gita within the context of the Mahabharata epic and of Hindu religious teachings and philosophy. Issues of the Gita are addressed in terms of the individual Self, material Nature, Liberation, and Deity. The useful Appendix is organized by main subject, and under each entry the relevant passages are "quoted in full", giving chapter and verse.

==== Sri Aurobindo ====
In his 1971 book Evolution in Religion, Zaehner discusses Sri Aurobindo Ghose (1872–1950), a modern Hindu spiritual teacher, and Pierre Teilhard de Chardin (1881–1955), a French palaeontologist and Jesuit visionary. Zaehner discusses each, and appraises their religious innovations.

Aurobindo at age seven was sent to England for education, eventually studying western classics at Cambridge University. On his return to Bengal in India, he studied its ancient literature in Sanskrit. He later became a major political orator with a spiritual dimension, a prominent leader for Indian independence. Hence he was jailed. There in 1908 he had a religious experience. Relocating to the then French port of Pondicherry, he became a yogin and was eventually recognized as a Hindu sage. Sri Aurobindo's writings reinterpret the Hindu traditions. Sarvepalli Radhakrishnan, later President of India, praised him. "As a poet, philosopher, and mystic, Sri Aurobindo occupies a place of the highest eminence in the history of modern India."

Aurobindo, Zaehner wrote, "could not accept the Vedanta in its classic non-dualist formulation, for he had come to accept Darwinism and Bergson's idea of creative evolution." If the One being was "totally static" as previously understood "then there could be no room for evolution, creativity, or development of any kind." Instead, as reported by Zaehner, Aurobindo considered that "the One though absolutely self sufficient unto itself, must also be the source... of progressive, evolutionary change." He found "the justification for his dynamic interpretation of the Vedanta in the Hindu Scriptures themselves, particularly in the Bhagavad-Gita." According to Aurobindo, the aim of his new yoga was:

"[A] change in consciousness radical and complete" of no less a jump in "spiritual evolution" than "what took place when a mentalised being first appeared in a vital and material animal world." Regarding his new Integral Yoga: "The thing to be gained is the bringing in of a Power of Consciousness... not yet organized or active directly in earth-nature, ...but yet to be organized and made directly active."

Aurobindo foresaw that a Power of Consciousness will eventually work a collective transformation in each human being, inviting us as a specie then to actually be able to form and sustain societies of liberté, égalité, fraternité. "It must be remembered that there is Aurobindo the socialist and Aurobindo the mystic."

Adherents of Aurobindo's new Integral Yoga (Purna Yoga) seek to lead India to a spiritual awakening, by facilitating an increasingly common soul-experience, in which each person achieves a mystic union with the One. Such a gnosis would be guided by the Power of Consciousness. In choosing to pursue the spiritual realization of social self-understanding, India would hasten the natural evolution of humanity. Hence furthering the conscious commitment everywhere, to collaborate with the hidden drive of creative evolution toward a spiritual advance, is high among the missions of Aurobindo's new 'Integral Yoga'.

=== Gifford lecture at St Andrews ===
Zaehner gave the Gifford Lectures in Scotland during the years 1967–1969. In these sessions he revisits comparative mysticism and Bucke, focuses on Hinduism and Buddhism, Yudhishthira and later Job, discusses Taoist classics, Neo-Confucianism, and Zen. He doesn't forget Jung or Zoroaster, Marx or Teilhard. The result is a 464-page book: Concordant Discord. The Interdependence of Faiths.

In the course of the discourse, he mentions occasionally a sophisticated view: how the different religions have provided a mutuality of nourishment, having almost unconsciously interpenetrated each other's beliefs. The historically obfuscated result is that neighbouring religions might develop the other's theological insights as their own, as well as employ the other's distinctions to accent, or explain, their own doctrines to themselves. Although Zaehner gives a suggestive commentary at the conjunction of living faiths, he respects that each remains distinct, unique. Zaehner allows the possibility of what he calls the convergence of faiths, or solidarity.

Regarding the world religions Zaehner held, however, that we cannot use the occasional occurrence of an ironic syncretism among elites as a platform from which to leap to a unity within current religions. His rear-guard opinions conflicted with major academic trends then prevailing. "In these ecumenical days it is unfashionable to emphasize the difference between religions." Yet Zaehner remained skeptical, at the risk of alienating those in the ecumenical movement whose longing for a festival of conciliation caused them to overlook the stubborn divergence inherent in the momentum. "We must force nothing: we must not try to achieve a 'harmony' of religions at all costs when all we can yet see is a 'concordant discord'... At this early stage of contact with the non-Christian religions, this surely is the most that we can hope for."

=== Social ideology and ethics ===
==== A militant state cult ====
Zaehner used a comparative-religion approach in his several discussions of Communism, both as philosophical-religious theory (discussed below), and here in its practical business running a sovereign state. In its ideological management of political and economic operations, Soviet party rule was sometimes said to demonstrate an attenuated resemblance to Catholic Church governance. Features in common included an authoritarian command structure (similar to the military), guided by a revered theory (or dogma), which was articulated in abstract principles and exemplars that could not be questioned.

For the Marxist-Leninist adherent, the 'laws of nature', i.e., dialectical materialism, was the orthodox, mandatory scientism. It dominated the political economy of society through its application, historical materialism. Accordingly, a complex dialectic involving class conflict provided a master key to these "natural" laws, however difficult to decipher.

"Stalin saw, quite rightly, that since the laws of Nature manifested themselves in the tactical vicissitudes of day-to-day politics with no sort of clarity, even the most orthodox Marxists were bound to go astray. It was, therefore, necessary that some one man whose authority was absolute, should be found to pronounce ex cathedra what the correct reading of historical necessity was. Such a man he found in himself."

A Soviet hierarchical system thus developed during the Stalinist era, which appeared to be a perverse copy of the organization of the Roman Catholic Church. Zaehner did not overlook the atrocities, whether large-scale and episodic (such as the Holodomor), or continuous on a smaller scale (such as the Gulag system), perpetrated during Stalin's rule, chiefly on his own overworked citizenry. Zaehner, however, did not further pursue the Leninist party's monopoly of state power. Instead, what perplexed him were other aspects of Marx and Engels: the artful pitch able to inspire popular motivation, its putative visionary import and quasi-religious dimensions that could attract the interest of free peoples.

==== Dialectical materialism ====
Marxist ideology has been compared to religious theology, perhaps its original source. Zaehner explored its explicitly materialist perspective, an ancient philosophical view further developed post-Hegel, then adopted by Karl Marx and Friedrich Engels. As a result, Hegel's idealist system of dialectics was turned 'downside up'. Zaehner's experience in espionage and comparative religion informed his search for the positive in the proffered dialectic of matter. An unlikely analogy was to the worldly benefits caused by the Spirit of Christianity, through its centuries-long role in guiding the social-development of church communities. Here Zaehner was inspired by Pierre Teilhard de Chardin: his writings on spirit and matter.

Zaehner writes that Friedrich Engels in his later life combined "Marxian materialism, Darwinian evolution, and eastern mysticism" in a philosophy that resembled religious teaching. This theme, however, was not taken up or developed in a Marxist-Leninist context. Writing in a philosophical mode, Engels utilized "a religion without a personal God and even without a Hegelian Absolute" in pursuit of fostering his nascent communist ideology.

Yet Herbert Marcuse condemned such static philosophizing, i.e., when party ideologists had employed the dialectic as if an academic tool to analyze industrialization in the mid-Soviet period. Marcuse rejected such abstract schema as inert, lifeless, not up to the stormy task of running an authentic socialist state. Instead, Marcuse averred, true materialist dialectics are fluid, flexible, and trade insights with the push and pull of human affairs. The true dialectic stays closely connected to the possibly-fierce dynamic of working-class struggle.

Au contraire, Arthur Koestler was dismayed to find that dialectical reason could not chart the party line. Yet the party simply rejected such thinking as "mechanistic". Are the dialectic and party line unpredictable, Koestler asked, irrational in their own terms? All was subtle and complex, the party counseled, reserved for party leaders trained in the malleable ideology. They alone could discern the interplay and feed-back of it all in actual operation. Koestler became cynical. Often the party appeared to manipulate its dialectical explanations to cover unjustified, abrupt changes in the party line. Such practices permitted an arbitrary rule by the party's leadership.

About the materialist dialectic itself, its signature political application by communist parties is to a conjectured 'history' of class warfare. In theory, the replacement of the bourgeoise (the dialectical thesis) in violent struggle by the proletariat (the antithesis) results in the fabled 'classless society' (synthesis), an "allegedly scientific utopia". Among its proponents such dialectic has drawn widely different interpretations. Zaehner, however, sought to find and to honor the beneficial and illuminating points in the grand materialist, humanistic vision of Karl Marx, despite what he saw as its otherwise disastrous teaching of suppression of individual freedom.

==== Cultural evolution ====
The interaction of evolutionary science and of social studies with traditional religions thought, particularly Christian, drew Zaehner's attention. Serving him as a catalyst were the writings on evolution by Teilhard de Chardin, and on mescaline by Aldous Huxley. Engendered is the mystical body of Christ as an active symbol of transformation, Christianity as a soul collective, which carries "the promise of sanctification to the material world re-created by man."

The physical potential in inorganic matter, according to Teilhard, 'spontaneously' develops into life organisms that reproduce, then such living matter eventually evolves consciousness, until eons hence a Christological collective Omega Point will be reached. The issue of such a future humanity-wide salvation on earth, in juxtaposition to the orthodox salvation of each individual confirmed at death, is apprehended and discussed. While energized and often favorable, Zaehner could turn a more critical eye toward Teilhard, while acknowledging his advocacy for the poor.

Juxtaposing (1) a spiritual understanding of graphic biblical stories, often from Genesis, that illuminate the human choices and conflicts, with (2) a conjectured historical narrative of early human society, Zaehner would then employ psychology and literature to craft an anthropology of modern social norms, within a spiritual commentary.

In a few different books Zaehner retold in several versions the 'simple' story of the Garden of Eden. Adam and Eve start in an unconscious state, analogous to prehistoric human beings. They remain unaware of good or evil, unconscious of sin. Tasting the forbidden fruit, however, of the tree of knowledge, offered by the serpent, opens their eyes. This their original sin results in their awakening. They are naked in the garden, they must leave it. Once unconsciously they enjoyed the free bounty of nature, but now they must work for a living and create a fallen human society to live in. Zaehner writes:

The discovery of evolution hit the Christian churches hard... . [T]he Genesis story has to be interpreted against the background of our evolutionary origin. Once we do this, then the Fall begins to look more like an ascent than a degradation. For self-consciousness which transforms man into a rational animal is a qualitative leap in the evolutionary process... life becomes conscious of itself.

In the multiple discussions referenced above, Zaehner is referring to the long-term cultural evolution of human societies, which happens in the wake of the billion-year biological evolution by natural selection. Of the later our bodies are heirs. Of the former our consciousness takes the lead. Sri Aurobindo, the subject of another book by Zaehner, advocated a disciplined commitment of the spirit, informed by yoga, to advancing the cultural evolution of the species.

==== 'New Age' drug culture ====
In his last three books, Drugs, Mysticism and Makebelieve (1972), Our Savage God (1974), and City within the Heart (1981) [posthumous], Zaehner turned to address issues in contemporary society, drawing on his studies of comparative religion. He further explored the similarities and the differences between drug-induced experiences and traditional mysticism. As an academic he had already published several books on such issues starting in 1957. In the meantime, a widespread counterculture had arisen, often called New Age, which included artists, rebels, and youth. Their psychedelic experiences were often self-explained spiritually, with reference to zen and eastern mysticism. Consequently, Zaehner wanted to reach this "wider public". During the late 1960s he was "very often invited to talk on the BBC."

Zaehner described various ancient quests to attain a mystical state of transcendence, of unification. Therein all contradictions and oppositions are reconciled; subject and object disappear, one passes beyond good and evil. That said, such a monist view can logically lead to excess, even to criminal acts. If practiced under the guidance of traditional religious teachers, no harm usually results. The potential for evil exists, however, through subtle misunderstanding or careless enthusiasm, according to Zaehner. After arriving at such a transcendent point, a troubled drug user may go wrong by feeling licensed to do anything, with no moral limit. The misuse of a mystical state and its theology eventually can lead to an horrific end.

Zaehner warned of the misbehavior propagated by LSD advocate Timothy Leary, the earlier satanism of Aleister Crowley, and ultimately the criminal depravity of Charles Manson. His essay "Rot in the Clockwork Orange" further illustrates from popular culture the possible brutal effects of such moral confusion and license.

Yet Zaehner's detailed examination and review was not a witch hunt. His concluding appraisal of the LSD experience, although not without warning of its great risks and dangers, contained a limited, circumscribed allowance for use with a spiritual guide.

==== Drugs, Mysticism ====
As its title indicates, the book addresses a range of contemporary issues. It was expanded from three talks he gave on BBC radio in 1970, which were printed in The Listener [9]. Although admittedly it repeats some material from his prior books, it is "aimed at a wider audience" (p. 9).

In his appraisal of LSD the psychedelic drug and its relevance to mysticism, Zaehner discussed the drug's popular advocate Timothy Leary and his 1970 book. Zaehner comments that, to the inexperienced, "most descriptions of Zen enlightenment, and some of LSD experience would appear to be almost identical." What Leary calls the "timeless energy process around you" (pp. 113–114 quote; 70 & 112 quote). Yet Zaehner refers to Krishnamurti of India, and zen abbot Zenkei Shibayama of Japan. Apparently each describes a crucial difference between meditation and such experiences as LSD (pp. 114–116).

The celebration of sex while under its influence by Leary and also by many in the drug culture Zaehner compared to the frequent use of sexual imagery by the mystics of different religious cultures [63, 66-70]. Even though passages in Leary's book comport with the Hindu Upanishads, Zaehner writes that by Leary's near deification of sexuality he "would appear to part company" with most nature mystics and, e.g., with St. Francis de Sales, who distinguishes mystical ecstasy and sexual ecstasy (pp. 68–69, 70 quote). In later discussing Georges Bernanos, Zaehner opines that "sex without love" would constitute an abandonment of the virtues (pp. 174–175).

Zaehner discusses Carl Jung and his 1952 book Answer to Job (pp. 163–170).

==== Our Savage God ====
The book's title is somewhat misleading. It attaches well, however, to its first chapter, "Rot in the Clockwork Orange", about the putative rationale of then contemporary episodes of mayhem and murder. About the hippie psychotic fringe, it made world headlines. Zaehner's focus is not on usual criminality but on hideous acts claiming a religious sanction, that with sinister cunning fakes the 'new age' (p. 12). The chapter's title refers to the 1962 novel by Anthony Burgess and the 1971 film by Stanley Kubrick (p. 35). Portrayed therein is crazy, soul-killing violence.

Yet, very differently, about his book on the whole Zaehner says its hero is Aristotle. The supporting cast is drawn from his "philosophical milieu" (p. 14). The next four chapters cover: Heraclitus per a dialectical unity of opposites (pp. 92, 102); Parmenides whose Way of Truth is compared to the Vedanta's Brahman (121-122); Plato (141-160); and the stagirite hero who arrives at Being, akin to Sat-Cit-Ananda (p. 192). As indicated, Zaehner offers a comparison of these Ancient Greek philosophers to the Vedic wisdom of ancient India, especially the mythopoetic element in the Upanishads (e.g., p. 133-138).

Yet this philosophical theme is somewhat misleading as well, for Zaehner intermittently interjects the ever-present and unwelcome possibility of criminality and mayhem. Charles Manson on occasion appears as the personification of the evil side of contemporary drug culture. His depraved mystical con-game provides some unappetizing food for thought.

== Quotations ==
- There is indeed a sharp division between those religions whose characteristic form of religious experience is prayer and adoration of Pascal's God of Abraham, God of Isaac, God of Jacob on the one hand, and religions in which sitting postures designed to find the God within you are thought to be the most appropriate way of approaching the Deity.
- Jung has done in the twentieth century A.D. what the Hindus did in perhaps the eighth century B.C.; he has discovered empirically the existence of an immortal soul in man, dwelling outside time and space, which can actually be experienced. This soul Jung, like the Hindus, calls the "self"... [which is] extremely difficult to describe in words. Hence his "self" is as hard to grasp as the Indian atman.
- One quite arresting resemblance between Zoroastrianism and Christianity remains to be noticed. This is the Haoma sacrifice and sacrament which seems to foreshadow the Catholic Mass in so strange a way. ... [T]he Haoma rite with partially fermented juice became the central act of Zoroastrian worship... .
- The whole ascetic tradition, whether it be Buddhist, Platonist, Manichaean, Christian or Islamic, springs from that most polluted of all sources, the Satanic sin of pride, the desire to be 'like gods'. We are not gods, we are social, irrational animals, designed to become rational, social animals, and finally, having built our house on solid Aristotelian rock, to become 'like a god', our work well done.
- Few Catholics are now proud of the Sack of Constantinople, the Albigensian Crusade, the Inquisition, or the Wars of Religion, nor... the Crusades. It has taken us a long time to realize that we cannot... remove the mote from our brother's eye without first getting rid of the beam in our own.
- True, the human phylum did not split up into separate subspecies as has been the case with other animal species, but it did split up into different religions and cultures, each having its own particular flavour, and each separated from the rest. With the outpouring of the Holy Spirit... the scattering of man which is symbolised by the Tower of Babel comes to an end: the Church of Christ is born and the symbol of unity and union is found.
- Aristotle claimed to have known God 'for a short time' only, but that was enough. He was never so immodest as to claim that he had known the Truth, for he knew that this is reserved for God alone.

== See also ==
- Comparative religion
- History of religions
- Religious studies
- Zoroastrianism
- Interfaith dialogue

== Bibliography ==
=== Zaehner's works ===
- Foolishness to the Greeks. Oxford University, 1953 (pamphlet). Reprint: Descale de Brouwer, Paris, 1974. As Appendix in Concordant Discord (1970), pp. 428–443.
- Zurvan. A Zoroastrian Dilemma. Oxford University, 1955. Reprint: Biblio and Tannen, New York, 1972.
- The Teachings of the Magi. A compendium of Zoroastrian beliefs. George Allen & Unwin, London, 1956. Reprints: Sheldon Press, 1972; Oxford, 1976. Translation:
  - Il Libro del Consiglio di Zarathushtra e altri testi. Compendio delle teorie zoroastriane. Astrolabio Ubaldini, Roma, 1976.
- Mysticism: Sacred and Profane. Clarendon Press, Oxford University, 1957, reprint 1961. Translations:
  - Mystik, religiös und profan. Ernst Klett, Stuttgart, 1957.
  - Mystiek sacraal en profaan. De Bezige Bij, Amsterdam, 1969.
  - Mystique sacrée, Mystique profane. Editorial De Rocher, Monaco, 1983.
- At Sundry Times. An essay in the comparison of religions. Faber & Faber, London, 1958. Alternate title, and translation:
  - The Comparison of Religions. Beacon Press, Boston, 1962.
  - Inde, Israël, Islam: religions mystiques et révelations prophétiques. Desclée de Brouwer, Paris, 1965.
- Hindu and Muslim Mysticism. Athlone Press, University of London, 1960. Reprints: Schocken, New York, 1969; Oneworld, Oxford, 1994.
- The Dawn and Twilight of Zoroastrianism. Weidenfeld & Nicolson, London, 1961. Translation:
  - Zoroaster e la fantasia religiosa. Il Saggiatore, Milano, 1962.
- Hinduism. Oxford University Press, London, 1962. Translations:
  - Der Hinduismus. Seine geschichte und seine lehre. Goldman, München, 1964.
  - L'Induismo. Il Mulino, Bologna, 1972.
  - L'hindouisme. Desclée de Brouwer, Paris, 1974.
- The Convergent Spirit. Towards a dialectics of Religion. Routledge & Kegan Paul, London, 1963. Alternate title:
  - Matter and Spirit. Their convergence in Eastern Religions, Marx, and Teilhard de Chardin. Harper & Row, New York, 1963.
- The Catholic Church and World Religions. Burns & Oates, London, 1964. Alternate title, and translation:
  - Christianity and other Religions. Hawthorn Books, New York, 1964.
  - El Cristianismo y les grandes religiones de Asia. Editorial Herder, Barcelona, 1967.
- Concordant Discord. The Interdependence of Faiths. Clarendon Press, Oxford University, 1970. Gifford Lectures 1967–1969. Translation:
  - Mystik. Harmonie und dissonanz. Walter, Olten/Freiburg, 1980.
- Dialectical Christianity and Christian Materialism. The Riddell Memorial Lectures. Oxford University Press, London, 1971.
- Evolution in Religion. A study of Sri Aurobindo and Pierre Teilhard de Chardin. Clarendon Press, Oxford University, 1971.
- Drugs, Mysticism and Make-believe. William Collins, London, 1972. Alternate title:
  - Zen, Drugs, and Mysticism. Pantheon Books, New York, 1972.
- Our Savage God. The Perverse use of Eastern Thought. Sheed & Ward, New York, 1974.
- The City within the Heart. Crossroad Publishing, New York, 1981. Introduction by Michael Dummett.

Selected articles

- "Zoroastrian survivals in Iranian folklore," in Journal of British Institute of Persian Studies, 1952; reprinted in Iran, v.3, pp. 87–96, 1965; Part II, in Iran, v.30, pp. 65–75, 1992.
- "Abu Yazid of Bistam" in Indo-Iranian Journal, v.1, pp. 286–301, 1957.
- "Islam and Christ", in Dublin Review, no. 474, pp. 271–88, 1957.
- "A new Buddha and a new Tao," in his The Concise Encyclopedia (1967), pp. 402–412. Jung, Marx.
- "Zoroastrianism," in Zaehner's edited The Concise Encyclopedia (1967), pp. 209–222; also 1997 edition.
- "Christianity and Marxism," in Jubilee 11: 8–11, 1963.
- "Sexual Symbolism in the Svetasvatara Upanishad," in J. M. Kitagawa (editor), Myths and Symbols: Studies in honor of Mircea Eliade, University of Chicago, 1969.
- "Learning from Other Faiths: Hinduism," in The Expository Times, v.83, pp. 164–168, 1972.
- "Our Father Aristotle" in Ph. Gignoux et A. Tafazzoli, editors, Memorial Jean de Menasce, Louvain: Impremerie orientaliste, 1974.

As translator/editor

- Hindu Scriptures. Translated and edited by R. C. Zaehner. J. M. Dent, London, 1966.
- The Bhagavad Gita. With commentary based on the ancient sources. Translated by R. C. Zaehner. Oxford Univ., London, 1969.
- The Concise Encyclopedia of Living Faiths. Edited by R. C. Zaehner. Hawthorn Books, New York, 1959. Reprints:
  - The Concise Encyclopedia of Living Faiths. Beacon Press, Boston, 1967.
  - The Hutchinson Encyclopedia of Living Faiths. Century Hutchinson, London, 1988.
  - Encyclopedia of the World's Religions. Barnes and Noble, New York, 1997.

=== Criticism, commentary ===
A Zaehner bibliography is in Fernandes (pp. 327–346).

Books

- Albano Fernandes, The Hindu Mystical Experience: A comparative philosophical study of the approaches of R. C. Zaehner & Bede Griffiths. Intercultural Pub., New Delhi 2004.
- George Kizhakkemury, The Converging Point. An appraisal of Professor R. C. Zaehner's approach to Islamic mysticism. Alwaye MCBS, New Delhi 1982.
- William Lloyd Newell, Struggle and Submission: R. C. Zaehner on Mysticisms. University Press of America, Washington 1981, foreword by Gregory Baum.
- John Paul Reardon, A Theological Analysis of R. C. Zaehner's Theory of Mysticism. Dissertation at Fordham University, New York 2012. {website}
- Richard Charles Schebera, Christian and Non-Christian Dialogue. The vision of R. C. Zaehner. University Press of America, Washington 1978.
- K. D. Sethna, The Spirituality of the Future: A search apropos of R. C. Zaehner's study in Sri Aurobindo and in Teilhard De Chardin. Fairleigh Dickinson University, Teaneck 1981.
- S. I. Sudiarja, The idea of God in Hinduism according to professor R. C. Zaehner. Pontificia Universitas Gregoriana, Roma 1991).
  - Jeffrey John Kripal, Roads of Excess, Palaces of Wisdom. University of Chicago 2001. Chapter III "Doors of Deception" (pp. 156–198) on Zaehner.
  - Shri Krishna Saksena, Essays on Indian Philosophy. University of Hawaii Prss, Honolulu 1970. Chapter (pp. 102–116) on Zaehner.
  - Michael Stoeber, Theo-Monistic Mysticism. A Hindu-Christian comparison St. Martin's, New York 1994). Esp. Chapter 5 "Theo-Monistic Hierarchy" (pp. 87–112) references Zaehner.

Articles

- Carlo Cereti, "Zaehner, Robert Charles" in Ehsan Yarshater, editor, Encyclopaedia Iranica.
- Robert D. Hughes, "Zen, Zurvan, and Zaehner: A Memorial Tribute... " in Studies in Religion 6: 139-148 (1976-1977).
- Ann K. S. Lambton, "Robert Charles Zaehner" in B.S.O.A.S. 38/3: 623–624 (London 1975).
- Morrison, George (1975). "Professor R. C. Zaehner". Iran. 13: iv. JSTOR 4300520.
- Geoffrey Parrinder, "Robert Charles Zaehner (1913–1974)" in History of Religions 16/1: 66–74 (Univ.of Chicago 1976).
- A. W. Sadler, "Zaehner-Huxley debate", in Journal of Religious Thought, v. 21/1 (1964), pp. 43–50.
- F. Whaling, "R. C. Zaehner: A Critique" in The Journal of Religious Studies 10: 77-118 (1982).
  - Michael Dummett, "Introduction" at pp. xi-xix, to Zaehner's posthumous The City within the Heart (1981).
