= Lived religion =

Religion as practiced in everyday life

Lived religion is the ethnographic and holistic framework in the sociology of religion and religious studies more broadly for understanding the religion as it is practiced by ordinary people in the contexts of everyday life, including domestic, work, commercial, community, and institutional religious settings. The term comes from the French tradition of sociology of religion, or "la religion vécue" though it has followed its own trajectory among scholars with backgrounds in anthropology, cultural studies, history, and sociology or religion as well as religious studies and theology. It is also referred to as "everyday religion" and "living religion."

The concept of lived religion was popularized in the late 20th century by religious study scholars like Nancy Ammerman, David D. Hall, Meredith McGuire, and Robert A. Orsi. The study of lived religion has come to include a wide range of subject areas as a means of exploring and emphasizing 1) ordinary people as religious subjects over against the traditional focus in religious studies on élite practitioners of religion; 2) religious practices and material resources, including human bodies, over against a traditional focus on religious doctrine, dogma, and ideologies primarily engaged in written texts; 3) sites of religious practice outside of institutional religious settings; and 4) ways of understanding religion as particular, local, variable, and otherwise shaped by the specific cultural, social, political, material, and other contexts of human experience rather than as a sui generis universal phenomenon focused on beliefs, sacred texts, and notions of the sacred as separate from the ordinary.

== Scholars ==
=== Nancy T. Ammerman ===
Nancy T. Ammerman is Professor Emerita of Sociology of Religion at Boston University. Her edited anthology Everyday Religion: Observing Modern Religious Lives was a significant advance in the study of everyday religion—the term she tends to prefer—by bringing together work by scholars such as Courtney Bender and Meredith McGuire who have shaped the study of living religion significantly. Ammerman studies religion as it plays out in the everyday lives of ordinary people and the contexts they inhabit—homes, offices, healthcare facilities, as well as institutional religious settings. Her approach, illustrated in Sacred Stories, Spiritual Tribes: Finding Religion in Everyday Life and detailed methodologically in Studying Lived Religion: Contexts and Practices, draws on the narrative and photographic reports of subjects' descriptions of their religious practices and resources in diverse fields of lived experience.

=== Meredith McGuire ===
Meredith McGuire is Professor Emerita of sociology and anthropology at Trinity University in San Antonio, Texas. She is the former President of the Society for the Scientific Study of Religion and the Association for the Sociology of Religion. Her notable contributions to the study of living religion include Lived Religion: Faith and Practice in Everyday Life, Religion: The Social Context, and Ritual Healing in Suburban America. Her work has been particularly important in highlighting the role of embodied experience in the practice of religion, drawing on Maurice Merleau-Ponty's concept of the "lived body" as the locus of human engagement with reality. McGuire's work illustrates the ways in which religion as practiced by ordinary people in the contexts of everyday life is often significantly different from "religion as prescribed"

=== Robert Orsi ===
Robert A. Orsi is Professor of Religious Studies and History and Grace Craddock Nagle Chair in Catholic Studies at Northwestern University. He researches, writes, and teaches about religion in the United States, in the past and in contemporary contexts, with a particular focus on American Catholicism. Orsi’s book The Madonna of 115th Street: Faith And Community In Italian Harlem, 1880-1950, won several prizes including the Jesuit National Book Award and is an example study of lived religion.

Orsi defines lived religion as including "the work of social agents/actors themselves as narrators and interpreters (and reinterpreters) of their own experiences and histories, recognizing that the stories we tell about others exist alongside the many and varied story they tell of themselves". Orsi understands lived religion to be centered on the actions and interpretations of religious persons. He is less attentive to the uses of religion by people who may not identify as "religious" or who are not affiliated with institutional religious traditions.

In "Everyday Miracles: The Study of Lived Religion," Orsi identifies four basic elements of living religion: 1) idiomatic expressions of religion, what limits are placed on then and what possibilities are open for their use in specific cultural settings; 2) knowledges of the body cultivated through religious practices; 3) structures of social experience created and reinforced through religious experience; and 4) characteristic tensions in everyday life that emerge within religious contexts. To this basic framework, 5) the role of religion in the cultivation of place as sacred or hold, secular or profane may be added as well as 60 the functions of religious discourse in everyday life can be added.

In order to study and write about lived religion, Orsi suggests a broad field of study in terms of topic matter and methodology. Orsi describes his own process of studying lived religion for Madonna On 115th Street as wide in scope. "I came to realize that I was learning as much from how people were to me as from what they were telling me, as much as what was going on around the stories as from the stories themselves." Rather than a narrow archival study, Orsi’s focus on non-traditional forms of research demands that scholars give attention to institutions and persons, texts and rituals, practices and theology, things and ideas. In order to study lived religion, Orsi advocates for a complex academic lens where almost anything can hold meaning and serve as a source or "text" for study.

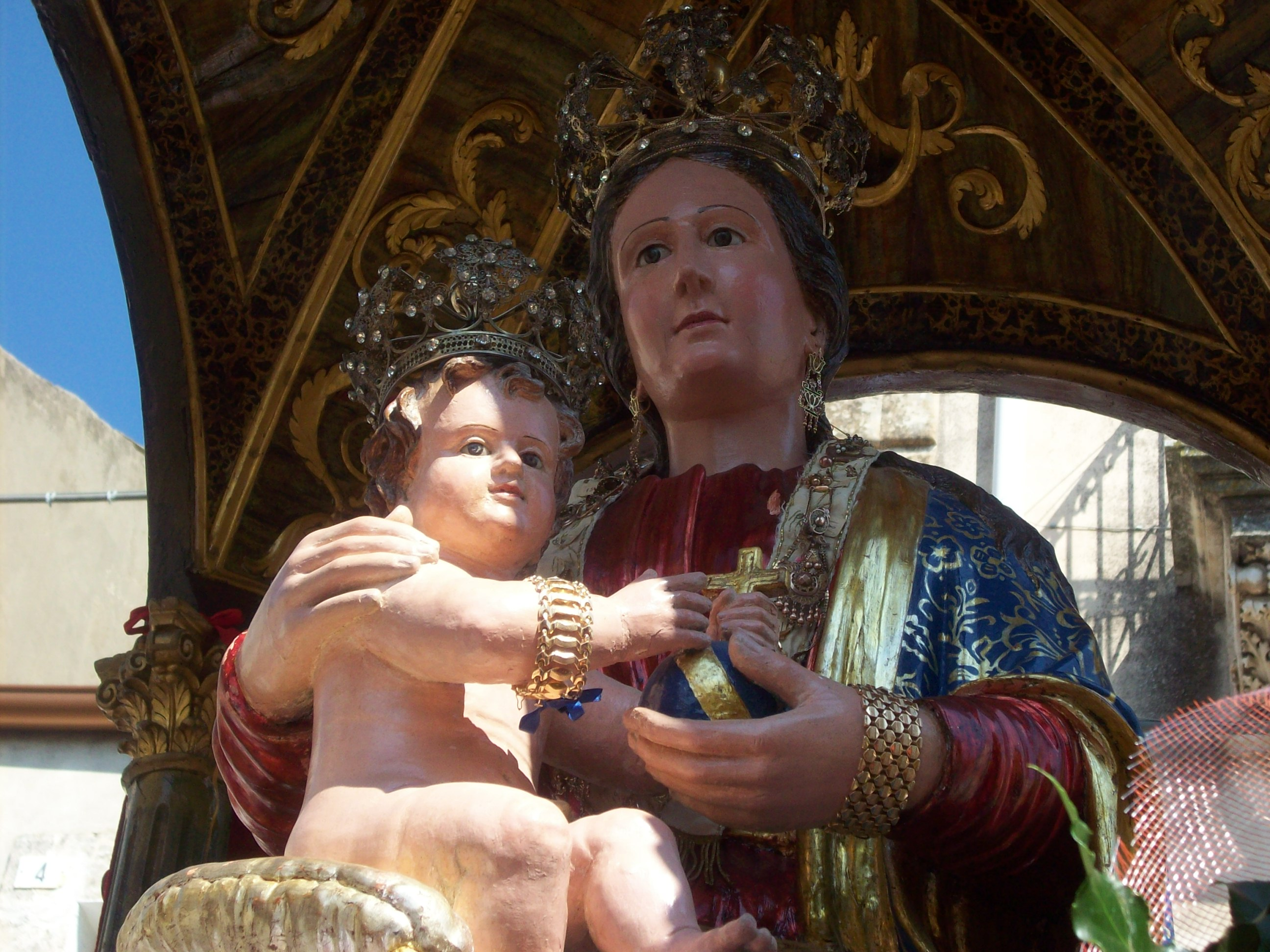
Madonna with Child

In The Madonna Of 115th Street, Orsi studies the lived religion of Catholic Italian immigrants in Harlem New York. Orsi focuses on a particular religious celebration known as the festa for The Madonna and the social structures that create and layer the event. Through observations, story telling, conversations and research Orsi weaves a picture of life for this immigrant community. In his book, Orsi explores and explains various internal traditions, cultures, and power and social dynamics in order to illustrate the various religious meanings and significance for community in Italian Harlem.

Orsi talks about the importance of dynamic subject matter covered by the study of lived religion. "The study of lived religion is shaped by and shapes the way family life is organized, for instance; how the dead are buried, children disciplined, the past and present imagined, moral boundaries established and challenged, home constructed, maintained and destroyed, the gods and spirits worshiped and importuned and so on."

=== Orsi's critique of popular religion ===
Orsi critiques popular religion as being a limited framework and method for studying religion. Orsi claims that popular religion is “unclear, misleading, and tendentious”. Orsi notes that popular religion is concerned only with the practices of "common folk" and distinguishing popular religion practices as separate from “official religion”. In his introduction to The Madonna on 115th Street, he writes, "Popular religion served to seal off certain expressions of religious life from unspecified but obviously normative religion." Orsi is concerned with the limitations of popular religions because he sees it as potentially authorizing legitimacy and boundaries in religious practices and beliefs. For Orsi, the implied intent in popular religion is to highlight the primitive, ignorant, and often marginalized practitioners of popular religion as a means of "policing religion". Orsi’s scholarly move to lived religion as a theoretical framework was an attempt to provide a more holistic approach to religious studies and also highlights the perspective that "religious practices and understandings only have meaning in relations to other cultural forms and in relations to the life experiences and actual circumstance of the people using them".

=== David D. Hall ===
David D. Hall has been a faculty member at Harvard Divinity School since 1989. Hall was Bartlett Professor of New England Church History until 2008, when he became Bartlett Research Professor. Hall writes extensively on religion and society in seventeenth-century New England and England. Hall edited a series of essays titled Lived Religion In America: Toward a History Of Practice, which is a foundational compilation in the study of lived religion. Hall’s book covers topics including gift exchange, cremation, hymn singing and many other essays on lived and practiced religious belief. Many of Hall's students have gone on to become notable scholars in the field of lived religion.

Hall defines lived religion as "rooted less in sociology than cultural and ethnographical approaches to the study of religion and American religious history". He instead sees lived religion as the study of the context and content of the practices of religious laity and their "everyday thinking". Hall believes that using lived religion as an approach to the study of religion allows for a wider interpretation of meaning and also provides an opportunity for historians to examine the past and present from many angles. For Hall, lived religion "does not depend on any single method or discipline".

Hall also acknowledges the limitations of lived religion. Hall suggests that as a field, lived religion is "fluid, mobile, and incompletely structured". Hall calls lived religion an "imperfect tool" noting that even with a dynamic study of laity it is impossible to fully understand any one person’s religious practices, especially when summarizing from a single location be it time or place.

=== Hall's critique of popular religion ===
Hall distinguishes the study of lived religion from popular religion by saying that popular religion is concerned with hierarchy and opposition in religious beliefs and practices. Hall writes, "Popular religion has therefore come to signify the space that emerged between official or learned Christianity and the profane (or ‘pagan’) culture." Hall critiques popular religion as imposing normative perspectives on practices.

=== Tanya M. Luhrmann ===
In her book How God Becomes Real, Tanya Luhrmann explores how people from various faith backgrounds come to experience and feel God as vividly real. She explains that believers create the experience of God's presence and of faith through regular practices such as stories, cultivating inner senses, strong sensory experiences, prayer, and more.

== See also ==
- Elite religion – Form of a religion the leaders deem official
- Folk religion – Expressions of religion distinct from the doctrines of organized religion

=== Other notable scholars ===
- Nancy T. Ammerman
- Courtney Bender
- Anne S. Brown
- María Del Socorro Castañeda
- Elizabeth Drescher
- Cheryl Forbes
- Rebecca Kneale Goul
- R. Marie Griffith – American academic (born 1967)
- Danièle Hervieu-Leger – French sociologist
- Meredith McGuire
- Michael McNally (scholar)
- Stephan Prothero
- Leigh Eric Schmidt
