= Religious studies =

Objective study of religion

Various religious symbols representing the world's largest religions (from left to right): 1st row: Christianity, Judaism, Hinduism; 2nd row: Islam, Buddhism, Shinto; 3rd row: Sikhism, the Baháʼí Faith, Jainism

Religious studies, also known as religiology or the study of religion, is the study of religion from a historical or scientific perspective. There is no consensus on what qualifies as religion and its definition is highly contested. It describes, compares, interprets, and explains religion, emphasizing empirical, historically based, and cross-cultural perspectives.

While theology attempts to understand the transcendent or supernatural according to traditional religious accounts, religious studies takes a more scientific and objective approach, independent of any particular religious viewpoint. Religious studies thus draws upon multiple academic disciplines and methodologies including anthropology, sociology, psychology, philosophy, and the history of religion.

Religious studies originated in 19th-century Europe, when scholarly and historical analysis of the Bible had flourished, as Hindu and Buddhist sacred texts were first being translated into European languages. Early influential scholars included Friedrich Max Müller in England and Cornelis Petrus Tiele in the Netherlands. However, Max Müller was a philologist, not a professor of religion; Cornelis Tiele was. Today, religious studies is an academic discipline practiced by scholars worldwide. In its early years, it was known as "comparative religion" or the science of religion and, in the United States, there are those who today also know the field as the "History of religion" (associated with methodological traditions traced to the University of Chicago in general, and in particular Mircea Eliade, from the late 1950s through to the late 1980s).

The religious studies scholar Walter Capps described the purpose of the discipline as to provide "training and practice ... in directing and conducting inquiry regarding the subject of religion". At the same time, Capps stated that its other purpose was to use "prescribed modes and techniques of inquiry to make the subject of religion intelligible." Religious studies scholar Robert A. Segal characterised the discipline as "a subject matter" that is "open to many approaches", and thus it "does not require either a distinctive method or a distinctive explanation to be worthy of disciplinary status."

Different scholars operating in the field have different interests and intentions; some for instance seek to defend religion, while others seek to explain it away, and others wish to use religion as an example with which to prove a theory of their own. Some scholars of religious studies are interested in primarily studying the religion to which they belong. Other scholars take a more unbiased approach and broadly examine the historical interrelationships among all major religious ideologies through history, focusing on shared similarities rather than differences. Scholars of religion have argued that a study of the subject is useful for individuals because it will provide them with knowledge that is pertinent in inter-personal and professional contexts within an increasingly globalized world. It has also been argued that studying religion is useful in appreciating and understanding sectarian tensions and religious violence.

== Etymology ==
The term "religion" originated from the Latin noun religio, that was nominalized from one of three verbs: relegere (to turn to constantly/observe conscientiously); religare (to bind oneself [back]); and reeligere (to choose again). Because of these three different potential meanings, an etymological analysis alone does not resolve the ambiguity of defining religion, since each verb points to a different understanding of what religion is. During the Middle Ages, the term "religious" was used as a noun to describe someone who had joined a monastic order (a "religious").

== Defining "religion" ==
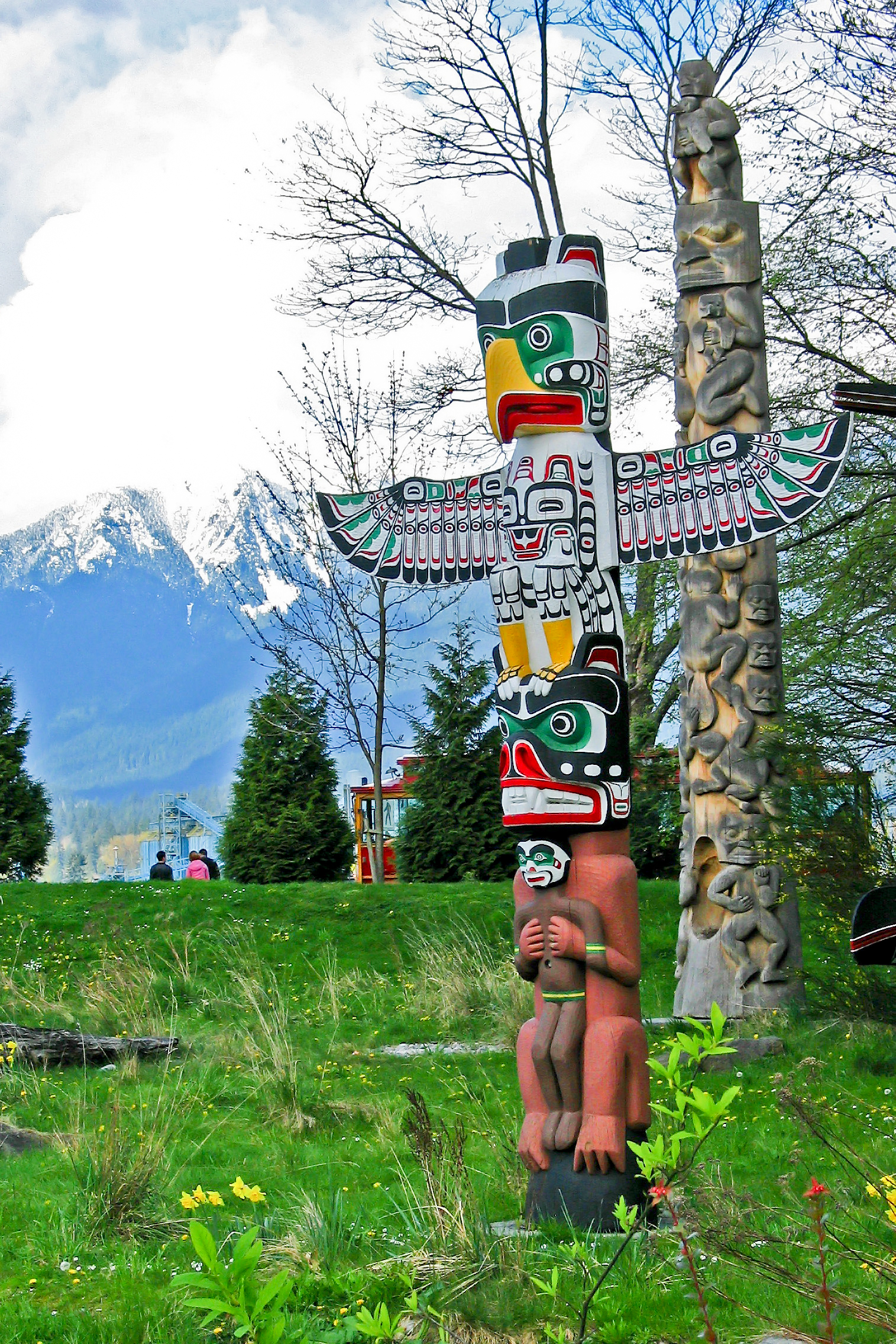
Totem poles reflect the beliefs of the Indigenous peoples of the Pacific Northwest Coast; some scholars of religious studies argue that the term "religion" is too Western-centric to encompass the beliefs and practices of non-Western civilizations.

Throughout the history of religious studies, there have been many attempts to define the term "religion". Many of these have been monothetic, seeking to determine a key, essential element which all religions share, which can be used to define "religion" as a category, and which must be necessary in order for something to be classified as a "religion". There are two forms of monothetic definition; the first is substantive, seeking to identify a specific core as being at the heart of religion, such as a belief in a God or gods, or an emphasis on power. The second are functional, seeking to define "religion" in terms of what it does for humans, for instance defining it by the argument that it exists to assuage fear of death, unite a community, or reinforce the control of one group over another. Other forms of definition are polythetic, producing a list of characteristics that are common to religion. In this definition, there is no one characteristic that needs to be common in every form of religion.

Causing further complications is the fact that there are various secular world views, such as nationalism and Marxism, which bear many of the same characteristics that are commonly associated with religion, but which rarely consider themselves to be religious.

Conversely, other scholars of religious studies have argued that the discipline should reject the term "religion" altogether and cease trying to define it. In this perspective, "religion" is argued to be a Western concept that has been forced upon other cultures in an act of intellectual imperialism. According to scholar of religion Russell T. McCutcheon, "many of the peoples that we study by means of this category have no equivalent term or concept at all". There is, for instance, no word for "religion" in languages like Sanskrit.

== Intellectual foundation and background ==
Religious studies became a field in its own right in The Netherlands by promulgating the so called 'duplex ordo' law in 1876. Before that, several key intellectual figures explored religion from a variety of perspectives. One of these figures was the famous pragmatist William James. His 1902 Gifford lectures and book The Varieties of Religious Experience examined religion from a psychological-philosophical perspective and is still influential today. His essay The Will to Believe defends the rationality of faith.

Max Weber studied religion from an economic perspective in The Protestant Ethic and the Spirit of Capitalism (1904–1905), his most famous work. As a major figure in sociology, he has no doubt influenced later sociologists of religion. Émile Durkheim also holds continuing influence as one of the fathers of sociology. He explored Protestant and Catholic attitudes and doctrines regarding suicide in his work Suicide. In 1912, he published his most memorable work on religion, The Elementary Forms of the Religious Life.

== History ==
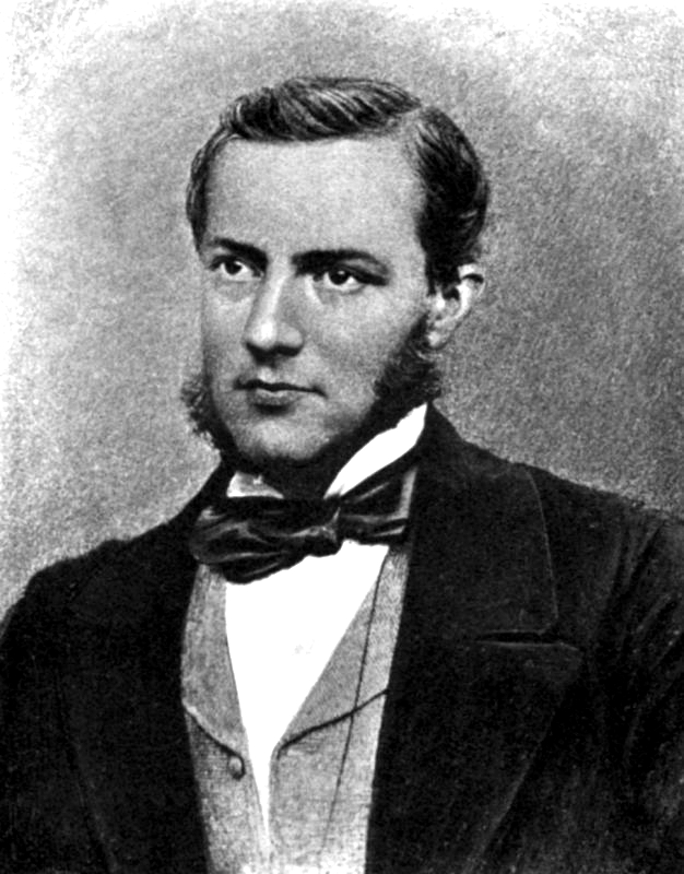
Max Müller; the first professor of comparative philology at Oxford University and author of Introduction to the Science of Religion

Interest in the general study of religion dates back to at least Hecataeus of Miletus (c. 550 BCE – c. 476 BCE) and Herodotus (c. 484 BCE – c. 425 BCE). Later, during the Middle Ages, Islamic scholars such as Ibn Hazm (d. 1064 CE) studied Persian, Jewish, Christian, and Indian religions, among others. The first history of religion was the Treatise on the Religious and Philosophical Sects (1127 CE), written by the Muslim scholar Muhammad al-Shahrastani. Peter the Venerable, also working in the twelfth century, studied Islam and made possible a Latin translation of the Qur'an.

Notwithstanding the long interest in the study of religion, the academic discipline Religious Studies is relatively new. Christopher Partridge notes that the "first professorships were established as recently as the final quarter of the nineteenth century."

In the nineteenth century, the study of religion was done through the eyes of science. Max Müller was the first professor of comparative philology at Oxford University, a chair created especially for him. In his Introduction to the Science of Religion (1873) he wrote that it is "the duty of those who have devoted their life to the study of the principal religions of the world in their original documents, and who value and reverence it in whatever form it may present itself, to take possession of this new territory in the name of true science."

Many of the key scholars who helped to establish the study of religion did not regard themselves as scholars of religious studies, but rather as theologians, philosophers, anthropologists, sociologists, psychologists, and historians.

Partridge writes that "by the second half of the twentieth century the study of religion had emerged as a prominent and important field of academic enquiry." He cites the growing distrust of the empiricism of the nineteenth century and the growing interest in non-Christian religions and spirituality coupled with convergence of the work of social scientists and that of scholars of religion as factors involved in the rise of Religious Studies.

One of the earliest academic institutions where Religious Studies was presented as a distinct subject was University College Ibadan, now the University of Ibadan, where Geoffrey Parrinder was appointed as lecturer in Religious Studies in 1949.

In the 1960s and 1970s, the term "religious studies" became common and interest in the field increased. New departments were founded and influential journals of religious studies were initiated (for example, Religious Studies and Religion). In the forward to Approaches to the Study of Religion, Ninian Smart wrote that "in the English-speaking world [religious studies] basically dates from the 1960s, although before then there were such fields as 'the comparative study of religion', the 'history of religion', the 'sociology of religion' and so on ..."

In the 1980s, in both Britain and America, "the decrease in student applications and diminishing resources in the 1980s led to cut backs affecting religious studies departments." (Partridge) Later in the decade, religious studies began to pick up as a result of integrating religious studies with other disciplines and forming programs of study that mixed the discipline with more utilitarian study.

Philosophy of religion uses philosophical tools to evaluate religious claims and doctrines. Western philosophy has traditionally been employed by English-speaking scholars. (Some other cultures have their own philosophical traditions including Indian, Muslim, and Jewish.) Common issues considered by the (Western) philosophy of religion are the existence of God, belief and rationality, cosmology, and logical inferences of logical consistency from sacred texts.

Although philosophy has long been used in evaluation of religious claims (e.g. Augustine and Pelagius's debate concerning original sin), the rise of scholasticism in the eleventh century, which represented "the search for order in intellectual life" (Russell, 170), more fully integrated the Western philosophical tradition (with the introduction of translations of Aristotle) in religious study.

== Academic disciplines within religious studies ==
There is some amount of overlap between subcategories of religious studies and the discipline itself. Religious studies seeks to study religious phenomena as a whole, rather than be limited to the approaches of its subcategories.

=== Anthropology of religion ===
The anthropology of religion is principally concerned with the common basic human needs that religion fulfills. The cultural anthropology of religion is principally concerned with the cultural aspects of religion. Of primary concern to the cultural anthropologist of religions are rituals, beliefs, religious art, and practices of piety.

=== Economics of religion ===
Gallup surveys have found that the world's poorest countries may be the most religious. Of those countries with average per-capita incomes under $2000, 95% reported that religion played an important role in their daily lives. This is contrasted by the average of 47% from the richest countries, with incomes over $25,000 (with the United States breaking the trend by reporting at 65%). Social scientists have suggested that religion plays a functional role (helping people cope) in poorer nations.

=== History of religion ===
The history of religions is not concerned with theological claims apart from their historical significance. Some topics of this discipline are the historicity of religious figures, events, and the evolution of doctrinal matters.

=== Interreligious studies ===
Interreligious studies is an emerging academic field that is focused on interactions among religious groups, including but not limited to interfaith dialogue. Journals and interdisiplinary organizing efforts grew especially in the 2010s. A pivotal anthology for the field is Interreligious/interfaith studies: Defining a new field by Eboo Patel, Jennifer Howe Peace, and Noah Silverman.

=== Literary approaches ===
There are many approaches to the study of sacred texts. One of these approaches is to interpret the text as a literary object. Metaphor, thematic elements, and the nature and motivations of the characters are of interest in this approach. An example of this approach is God: A Biography, by Jack Miles.

=== Neurological approaches ===
The temporal lobe has been of interest and has even been termed the "God center" of the brain. (Ramachandran, ch. 9) Neurological findings in regard to religious experience is not a widely accepted discipline within religious studies. Scientific investigators have used a SPECTscanner to analyze the brain activity of both Christian contemplatives and Buddhist meditators, finding them to be quite similar.

=== Origin of religion ===
The "origin of religion" refers to the emergence of religious behavior in prehistory, before written records.

=== Psychology of religion ===
The psychology of religion is concerned with the psychological principles operative in religious communities and practitioners. William James's The Varieties of Religious Experience analyzed personal experience as contrasted with the social phenomenon of religion. Some issues of concern to the psychologist of religions are the psychological nature of religious conversion, the making of religious decisions, religion and happiness, and the psychological factors in evaluating religious claims.

Sigmund Freud was another figure in the field of psychology and religion. He used his psychoanalytic theory to explain religious beliefs, practices, and rituals, in order to justify the role of religion in the development of human culture.

=== Sociology of religion ===
The sociology of religion concerns the dialectical relationship between religion and society; the practices, historical backgrounds, developments, universal themes and roles of religion in society. There is particular emphasis on the recurring role of religion in all societies and throughout recorded history. The sociology of religion is distinguished from the philosophy of religion in that it does not set out to assess the validity of religious beliefs, though the process of comparing multiple conflicting dogmas may require what Peter L. Berger has described as inherent "methodological atheism". Whereas the sociology of religion broadly differs from theology in assuming the invalidity of the supernatural, theorists tend to acknowledge socio-cultural reification of religious practise.

The sociology of religion also deals with how religion impacts society regarding the positive and negatives of what happens when religion is mixed with society. Theorist such as Marx states that "religion is the opium of the people" - the idea that religion has become a way for people to deal with their problems. At least one comprehensive study refutes this idea. Research has found that secular democracies like France or Scandinavia outperform more theistic democracies on various measures of societal health. The authors explains, "Pressing questions include the reasons, whether theistic or non-theistic, that the exceptionally wealthy U.S. is so inefficient that it is experiencing a much higher degree of societal distress than are less religious, less wealthy prosperous democracies. Conversely, how do the latter achieve superior societal health while having little in the way of the religious values or institutions?"

=== Law and religion ===
Vogel reports that in the 1970s a new "law and religion" approach has progressively built its own contribution to religious studies. Over a dozen scholarly organizations and committees were formed by 1983, and a scholarly quarterly, the Journal of Law and Religion first published that year and the Ecclesiastical Law Journal opened in 1999. Many departments and centers have been created around the world during the last decades. As of 2012, major Law and Religion organizations in the U.S. included 500 law professors, 450 political scientists, and specialists in numerous other fields such as history and religious studies. Between 1985 and 2010, the field saw the publication of some 750 books and 5000 scholarly articles. Scholars are not only focused on strictly legal issues about religious freedom or non establishment but also on the study of religions as they are qualified through judicial discourses or legal understanding on religious phenomena. Exponents look at canon law, natural law, and state law, often in comparative perspective. Specialists have explored themes in western history regarding Christianity and justice and mercy, rule and equity, discipline and love. Common topics on interest include marriage and the family, and human rights. Moving beyond Christianity, scholars have looked at law and religion interrelations in law and religion in the Muslim Middle East, and pagan Rome.

=== Religion and cinema ===
The earliest serious writing on the interface between religion and cinema appeared in the work of film critics like Jean Epstein in the 1920s. The subject has grown in popularity with students and is cited as having particular relevance given the pervasiveness of film in modern culture. Approaches to the study of religion and film differ among scholars; functionalist approaches for instance view film as a site in which religion is manifested, while theological approaches examine film as a reflection of God's presence in all things.

== Methodologies ==
A number of methodologies are used in Religious Studies. Methodologies are hermeneutics, or interpretive models, that provide a structure for the analysis of religious phenomena.

=== Phenomenology ===
Phenomenology is "arguably the most influential approach to the study of religion in the twentieth century." (Partridge). The term is first found in the title of the work of the influential philosopher of German Idealism, Georg Wilhelm Friedrich Hegel, entitled The Phenomenology of Spirit. Phenomenology had been practiced long before its being made explicit as a philosophical method by Edmund Husserl, who is considered to be its founder. In the context of Phenomenology of religion however, the term was first used by Pierre Daniel Chantepie de la Saussaye in his work "Lehrbuch der Religiongeschichte" (1887). Chantepie's phenomenology catalogued observable characteristics of religion much like a zoologist would categorize animals or an entomologist would categorize insects.

In part due to Husserl's influence, "phenomenology" came to "refer to a method which is more complex and claims rather more for itself than did Chantepie's mere cataloguing of facts." (Partridge) Husserl argued that the foundation of knowledge is consciousness. He recognized "how easy it is for prior beliefs and interpretations to unconsciously influence one's thinking, Husserl's phenomenological method sought to shelve all these presuppositions and interpretations." (Partridge) Husserl introduced the term "eidetic vision" to describe the ability to observe without "prior beliefs and interpretations" influencing understanding and perception.

His other main conceptual contribution is the idea of the epoche: setting aside metaphysical questions and observing phenomena in and of themselves, without any bias or commitments on the part of the investigator. The epoche, also known as phenomenological reduction or bracketing, involves approaching a phenomenon or phenomena from a neutral standpoint, instead of with our own particular attitudes. In performing this reduction, whatever phenomenon or phenomena we approach are understood in themselves, rather than from our own perspectives. In the field of religious studies, a contemporary advocate of the phenomenological method is Ninian Smart. He suggests that we should perform the epoche as a means to engage in cross-cultural studies. In doing so, we can take the beliefs, symbols, rituals etc. of the other from within their own perspective, rather than imposing ours on them. Another earlier scholar who employs the phenomenological method for studying religion is Gerardus van der Leeuw. In his Religion in Essence and Manifestation (1933), he outlines what a phenomenology of religion should look like:

- Firstly, argues van der Leeuw, the student of religion needs to classify the religious phenomena into distinct categories: e.g. sacrifice, sacrament, sacred space, sacred time, sacred word, festivals, and myth.
- Secondly, scholars then need to interpolate the phenomena into their own lives. That is to say, they need to empathetically (Einfühlung) try and understand the religion from within. ... The life examined by the religious studies scholar, insists van der Leeuw, needs to "acquire its place in the life of the student himself who should understand it out of his inner self."
- Thirdly, van der Leeuw stresses perhaps the fundamental phenomenological principle, namely epoch, the suspension of value-judgements and the adoption of a neutral stance.
- Fourthly, scholars needs to clarify any apparent structural relationships and make sense of the information. In so doing, they move towards a holistic understanding of how the various aspects of a religion relate and function together.
- Fifthly, this leads naturally to a stage at which "all these activities, undertaken together and simultaneously, constitute genuine understanding [Verstehen]: the chaotic and obstinate 'reality' thus becomes a manifestation, a revelation" (eidetic vision).
- Sixthly, having thus attained this general grasp, there is a continual need to make sure that it tallies with the up-to-date research of other disciplines, such as archaeology, history, philology etc. For van der Leeuw, as for other phenomenologists, the continual checking of one's results is crucial to the maintenance of scholarly objectivity. In order to avoid degeneration into fantasy, phenomenology must always feed on facts.
- Finally, having gone through the above six stages, the phenomenologist should be as close as anyone can be to an understanding of the 'meaning' of the religious phenomena studied and be in a position to relate his understanding to others.

The subjectivity inherent to the phenomenological study of religion makes complete and comprehensive understanding highly difficult. However, phenomenologists aim to separate their formal study of religion from their own theological worldview and to eliminate, as far as possible, any personal biases (e.g., a Christian phenomenologist would avoid studying Hinduism through the lens of Christianity).

There are a number of both theoretical and methodological attitudes common among phenomenologists: source

- Phenomenologists tend to oppose the acceptance of unobservable matters and grand systems erected in speculative thinking;
- Phenomenologists tend to oppose naturalism (also called objectivism and positivism), which is the worldview growing from modern natural science and technology that has been spreading from Northern Europe since the Renaissance;
- Positively speaking, phenomenologists tend to justify cognition (and some also evaluation and action) with reference to what Edmund Husserl called Evidenz, which is awareness of a matter itself as disclosed in the most clear, distinct, and adequate way for something of its kind;
- Phenomenologists tend to believe that not only objects in the natural and cultural worlds, but also ideal objects, such as numbers, and even conscious life itself can be made evident and thus known;
- Phenomenologists tend to hold that inquiry ought to focus upon what might be called "encountering" as it is directed at objects and, correlatively, upon "objects as they are encountered" (this terminology is not widely shared, but the emphasis on a dual problematics and the reflective approach it requires is);
- Phenomenologists tend to recognize the role of description in universal, a priori, or "eidetic" terms as prior to explanation by means of causes, purposes, or grounds; and
- Phenomenologists tend to debate whether or not what Husserl calls the transcendental phenomenological epochê and reduction is useful or even possible.

Many scholars of religious studies argued that phenomenology was "the distinctive method of the discipline". In 2006, the phenomenologist of religion Thomas Ryba noted that this approach to the study of religion had "entered a period of dormancy". Phenomenological approaches were largely taxonomical, with Robert A. Segal stating that it amounted to "no more than data gathering" alongside "the classification of the data gathered".

=== Functionalism ===
Functionalism, in regard to religious studies, is the analysis of religions and their various communities of adherents using the functions of particular religious phenomena to interpret the structure of religious communities and their beliefs. The approach was introduced by British anthropologist Alfred Radcliffe-Brown. A major criticism of functionalism is that it lends itself to teleological explanations. An example of a functionalist approach is understanding the dietary restrictions contained in the Pentateuch as having the function of promoting health or providing social identity (i.e. a sense of belonging though common practice).

=== Lived religion ===
Lived religion is the ethnographic and holistic framework for understanding the beliefs, practices, and everyday experiences of religious and spiritual persons in religious studies. The name lived religion comes from the French tradition of sociology of religion "la religion vécue".

The concept of lived religion was popularized in the late twentieth century by religious study scholars like Robert A. Orsi and David Hall. The study of lived religion has come to include a wide range of subject areas as a means of exploring and emphasizing what a religious person does and what they believe. Today, the field of lived religion is expanding to include many topics and scholars.

== Religious studies and theology ==
Western philosophy of religion, as the basic ancestor of modern religious studies, is differentiated from theology and the many Eastern philosophical traditions by generally being written from a third party perspective. The scholar does not need to be a believer. Theology stands in contrast to the philosophy of religion and religious studies in that, generally, the scholar is first and foremost a believer employing both logic and scripture as evidence. Theology according to this understanding fits with the definition which Anselm of Canterbury gave to it in the eleventh century, credo ut intelligam, or faith seeking understanding (literally, "I believe so that I may understand"). The theologian was traditionally seen as having the task of making intelligible, or clarifying, the religious commitments. However, many contemporary scholars of theology do not assume such a dichotomy. Instead, scholars now understand theology as a methodology in the study of religion, an approach that focuses on the religious content of any community they might study. This includes the study of their beliefs, literatures, stories and practices.

== Criticism ==
Scholars, such as Jonathan Z. Smith, Timothy Fitzgerald, Talal Asad, Tomoko Masuzawa, Geoffrey A. Oddie, Richard E. King, and Russell T. McCutcheon, have criticized religious studies as a theological project which actually imposes views onto the people it aims to survey. Their areas of research overlap heavily with postcolonial studies.

In 1998, Jonathan Z. Smith wrote a chapter in Critical Terms for Religious Studies which traced the history of the term religion and argued that the contemporary understanding of world religions is a modern Christian and European term, with its roots in the European colonial expansion of the sixteenth century. Timothy Fitzgerald argued in 2000 that the comparative religion of the twentieth century in fact disguised a theological agenda which distorts the practices of societies outside the Western world and interprets them according to Christian norms. Fitzgerald argues that this theological agenda has not been overcome by more recent efforts in religious studies to move beyond comparative religion.

== Bibliography ==
- Capps, Walter H. (1995). Religious Studies: The Making of a Discipline. Minneapolis: Fortress Press. ISBN 9780800625351.
- Christiano, Kevin J.; Kivisto, Peter; Swatos, William H. Jr., eds. (2015) [2002]. "Studying Religion". Sociology of Religion: Contemporary Developments (3rd ed.). Walnut Creek, California: AltaMira Press. pp. 29–58. doi:10.2307/3512222. ISBN 978-1-4422-1691-4. JSTOR 3512222. LCCN 2001035412. S2CID 154932078.
- Dawson, Lorne L. (March 2018). "Challenging the Curious Erasure of Religion from the Study of Religious Terrorism". Numen. 65 (2–3 – Special Issue: Religion and Terrorism). Leiden and Boston: Brill Publishers: 141–164. doi:10.1163/15685276-12341492. eISSN 1568-5276. ISSN 0029-5973. JSTOR 26566250. LCCN 58046229. OCLC 50557232. S2CID 149488678.
- Fitzgerald, Timothy (2003) [2000]. The Ideology of Religious Studies. Oxford and New York City: Oxford University Press. ISBN 9780195167696.
- Herling, Bradley L. (2016). A Beginner's Guide to the Study of Religion (2nd ed.). London: Bloomsbury Publishing. ISBN 978-1-4725-0692-4.
- Hinnells, John R., ed. (2005). "Introduction". The Routledge Companion to the Study of Religion. Abingdon, Oxfordshire: Routledge. pp. 1–3. ISBN 978-0-415-33310-8.
- Mani, Rama (April–June 2012). "Cure or Curse? The Role of Religion in Violent Conflict and Peaceful Governance". Global Governance. 18 (2). Leiden and Boston: Brill Nijhoff: 149–169. doi:10.1163/19426720-01802002. eISSN 1942-6720. ISSN 1075-2846. JSTOR 23269947. S2CID 143349871.
- McCutcheon, Russell T. (2001). Critics Not Caretakers: Redescribing the Public Study of Religion. Albany, New York: State University of New York Press. ISBN 9780791449448.
- Ryba, Thomas (2021) [2006]. "Phenomenology of Religion". In Segal, Robert A. (ed.). The Blackwell Companion to the Study of Religion (2nd ed.). Malden: Wiley-Blackwell. pp. 91–121. ISBN 9781405185981. LCCN 2020036470.
- Segal, Robert A., ed. (2021) [2006]. "Introduction". The Blackwell Companion to the Study of Religion (2nd ed.). Malden: Wiley-Blackwell. pp. xiii–xix. ISBN 9781405185981. LCCN 2020036470.
- Smart, Ninian (1998). The World's Religions (second ed.). Cambridge and New York City: Cambridge University Press. ISBN 0-521-63139-4.
- Smith, Jonathan Z. (2013) [1998]. "Religion, Religions, Religious". In Taylor, Mark C. (ed.). Critical Terms for Religious Studies. Chicago: University of Chicago Press. pp. 269–284. ISBN 978-0-226-79157-9.
- Stausberg, Michael (March 2021). Feldt, Laura; Valk, Ülo (eds.). "The Demise, Dissolution, and Elimination of Religions". Numen. 68 (2–3 – Special Issue: The Dissolution of Religions). Leiden and Boston: Brill Publishers: 103–131. doi:10.1163/15685276-12341617. eISSN 1568-5276. hdl:11250/2977936. ISSN 0029-5973. LCCN 58046229. OCLC 50557232. S2CID 233629178.
- Wright, Melanie (2007). Religion and Film: An Introduction. London and New York City: I.B. Tauris. ISBN 9781850437598.
