= Parrinder =

Parrinder is a surname. Notable people with the surname include:

- Geoffrey Parrinder (1910–2005), English professor of religion and author
- Patrick Parrinder (born 1944), English academic
