= Russell T. McCutcheon =

Canadian scholar of religion

- Born: Russell Tracey McCutcheon; 1961 (age 64–65)

Academic background
- Education: Queen's University; University of Toronto
- Thesis: Manufacturing Religion (1995)
- Doctoral advisor: Neil McMullin
- Other advisors: Ernest Best; Pamela Dickey Young

Academic work
- Discipline: Religious studies
- Institutions: Southwest Missouri State University; University of Alabama

Russell Tracey McCutcheon (born 1961) is a Canadian religion scholar who earned a PhD in religious studies from the University of Toronto in 1995.

== Biography ==
McCutcheon is a professor in the department of religious studies at the University of Alabama, and was department chair from 2001 to 2009, and again from 2013 to 2023. He was an editor of the quarterly periodical Method & Theory in the Study of Religion from 1997 to 2001. In 2005, McCutcheon was elected President of the Council of Societies for the Study of Religion, headquartered at Rice University. He is the founder and series editor for the anthology series, Critical Categories in the Study of Religion.

He has been noted for a controversy concerning methodology in the field of religious studies. This controversy centered on a rather polemical exchange between McCutcheon and Robert A. Orsi, who held a teaching position at Harvard University and Harvard Divinity School, with Orsi referring to McCutcheon's book, The Discipline of Religion, as "chilling". Orsi also made the comment, "the assumption appears to be that the scholar of religion by virtue of his or her normative epistemology, theoretical acuity, and political knowingness, has the authority and the right to make the lives of others the objects of his or her scrutiny. He or she theorizes them." McCutcheon responded with a paper included in the Journal of the American Academy of Religion entitled, "It's a Lie. There's No Truth in It! It's a Sin! On the Limits of the Humanistic Study of Religion and the Costs of Saving Others from Themselves".

== Books ==
- Manufacturing Religion: The Discourse on Sui Generis Religion and the Politics of Nostalgia. Oxford University Press. 1997. ISBN 9780190282981.
- with Willi Braun, Guide to the Study of Religion, London; New York: Continuum, 2000.
- The Discipline of Religion: Structure, Meaning, Rhetoric, London; New York: Routledge, 2003.
- Religion and the Domestication of Dissent: Or, How To Live in a Less Than Perfect Nation, Sheffield: Equinox, 2005.
- Studying Religion: An Introduction, London; Oakville, CT: Equinox, 2007
- with William E. Arnal, The Sacred is the Profane: The Political Nature of "Religion" . New York: Oxford University Press, 2013.
- A Modest Proposal on Method: Essaying the Study of Religion, Leiden; Boston: Brill, 2015.
