= David D. Hall =

American historian of religion (born 1936)

- Born: David Drisko Hall; July 8, 1936 (age 90)

Academic background
- Education: Harvard University; Yale University

Academic work
- Discipline: History
- Sub-discipline: American religious history
- Institutions: Yale University; Boston University; Harvard University
- Doctoral students: R. Marie Griffith
- Main interests: Ecclesiastical history of New England

David Drisko Hall (born 1936) is an American historian, and was Bartlett Professor of New England Church History, at Harvard Divinity School.

== Life ==
Hall was born on July 8, 1936. He graduated from Harvard University, and from Yale University with a PhD. He is well known for introducing lived religion to religious studies scholarship in the United States, most notably at Harvard Divinity School.

== Awards ==
- 1991 Merle Curti Award
- 2007 A.S.W. Rosenbach Lectures in Bibliography

== Works ==
- The Faithful Shepherd: A History of the New England Ministry in the Seventeenth Century, Omohundro Institute, 1972 (Harvard Divinity School, 2006, ISBN 978-0-674-01959-1)
- Hall, David D. (1989). Worlds of Wonder, Days of Judgment: Popular Religious Belief in Early New England. Knopf. ISBN 978-0-394-50108-6. (Harvard University Press, 1990, ISBN 978-0-674-96216-3)
- Puritans in the New World: A Critical Anthology. Princeton University Press. 2004. ISBN 978-0-691-11409-5.
- Hall, David D. (2008). Ways of writing: the practice and politics of text-making in seventeenth-century New England. University of Pennsylvania Press. ISBN 978-0-8122-4102-0.
- Hall, David D. (2019). The Puritans: A Transatlantic History. Princeton University Press. ISBN 978-0-6912-0337-9.

=== Editor ===
- Hall, David D. (1990). The Antinomian Controversy of 1636-1638: A Documentary History. Duke University Press. ISBN 978-0-8223-1091-4.
- David D. Hall, ed. (1997). Lived Religion in America. Princeton University Press.
- David D. Hall, ed. (1999). Witch-Hunting in Seventeenth-Century New England: A Documentary History, 1638-1693. Northeastern University Press. ISBN 978-0-8223-3613-6. (reprint Duke University Press, 2005, ISBN 978-0-8223-3613-6)
- Hugh Amory; David D. Hall, eds. (2000). The Colonial Book in the Atlantic World. Cambridge University Press. ISBN 978-0-521-48256-1.

=== Criticism ===
- "Review: Toleration", William & Mary Quarterly, April 2009
