= R. Marie Griffith =

American academic (born 1967)

- Born: Ruth Marie Griffith; 1967 (age 58–59)

Academic background
- Education: University of Virginia; Harvard University
- Thesis: A Network of Praying Women (1995)
- Doctoral advisor: David D. Hall

Academic work
- Discipline: Political studies; religious studies
- Institutions: Princeton University; Harvard University; Washington University in St. Louis

Ruth Marie Griffith (born 1967) is the John C. Danforth Distinguished Professor in the Humanities at Washington University in St. Louis and the former John A. Bartlett Professor at Harvard University. Griffith majored in political and social thought as an undergraduate at the University of Virginia before getting her PhD in the study of religion from Harvard University.
