= Elite religion =

Form of a religion the leaders deem official

In sociology, elite religion is defined as the symbols, rituals and beliefs which are recognized as legitimate by the leadership of that religion. Elite religion is often contrasted with folk religion, or the religious symbols and beliefs of the masses. Elite religion is then the "official religion" as championed by the leaders of a religion. Some researchers see the concept as potentially applying to a range of internal religious divisions such as orthodoxy versus heterodoxy, between the clergy and the laity, or between the religion's wealthy adherents and the poor.

== Contrast with folk religion ==
Whereas the primary expression of elite religion is in religious ideology, folk religion is primarily expressed in religious rituals and symbols. Elite religion's ideology is characterized as internally unified, while the beliefs or ideas that underlie different religious folk rituals may be incompatible with one another. Folk religious practices concerning key rituals, such as coming of age ceremonies, may become the object of intense elite criticism.

== Strengthening denominationalism ==
Sociologist Charles Liebman theorized that the strengthening of elite religion over members of a particular group led to the growth of denominationalism.

== See also ==
- Orthopraxy – Correct conduct in religions
- Lived religion – Religion as practiced in everyday life
