= Political history of Sri Aurobindo =

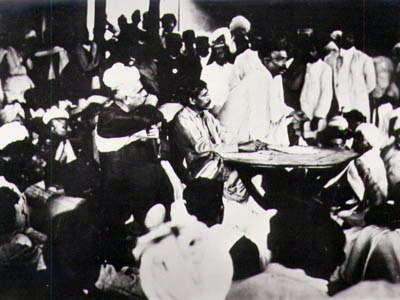
Sri Aurobindo presiding over a meeting of the Nationalists after the Surat Congress,1907

Sri Aurobindo's political career lasted only four years, from 1906 to 1910. Though he had been active behind the scene surveying, organizing and supporting the nationalist cause, ever since his return to India, especially during his excursions to Bengal. This period of his activity from 1906-1910 saw a complete transformation of India's political scene. Before Sri Aurobindo began publishing his views, the Congress was an annual debating society whose rare victories had been instances of the empire taking a favourable view to its petitions. By the time Aurobindo left the field, the ideal of political independence had been firmly ingrained into the minds of people, and nineteen years later, it became the official raison d'être of the Congress.

This change was affected by the advent of the aggressive nationalist thought of Lokmanya Tilak who declared that swaraj was his birthright and Bipin Chandra Pal who demanded "complete autonomy" from Britain. However, none went as far as Aurobindo in articulating the legitimacy and necessity of complete independence. He "based his claim for freedom for India on the inherent right to freedom, not on any charge of misgovernment or oppression". He wrote :

"Political freedom is the life-breath of a nation; to attempt social reform, educational reform, industrial expansion, the moral improvement of the race without aiming first and foremost at political freedom, is the very height of ignorance and futility. Such attempts are foredoomed to disappointment and failure; yet when the disappointment and failure come, we choose to attribute them to some radical defect in the national character, as if the nation were at fault and not its wise men who would not or

could not understand the first elementary conditions of success. The primary requisite for national progress, national reform, is the free habit of free and healthy national thought and action which is impossible in a state of servitude. The second is the organization of the national will in a strong central authority.

(Complete Works of Sri Aurobindo, VOL 6-7, Bande Mataram, Pg 266)."

== Beginnings ==
Sri Aurobindo had become contemptuous of the British rule in India since his days as a student in England. While at the beginning of Sri Aurobindo's educational career, his father had been a believer in the superiority of the British People, by the time Sri Aurobindo was nearing the end of his education in England, Dr. Ghose started mailing Aurobindo newspaper clips of atrocities unleashed by the British on the Indian people. While at King's college, Aurobindo was drawn to Irish nationalists such as Charles Stewart Parnell. He wrote, in praise of Parnell :

"Patriots, behold your guerdon! This man found

Erin, his Mother, beaten, chastised, bound,
Naked to imputation poor, denied,

While alien masters held her house of pride"

This personification of the subjugated nation as the Mother in chains, was a recurring theme in Aurobindo's writings and would later come to galvanize a generation of Indian revolutionaries. From his observations of the British Politics, Aurobindo became convinced that India had little hope from the British Parliament. While in London he joined up with a society of revolutionaries called "Lotus and Dagger" who were committed to overthrowing the British. His activities in England, though, were inconsequential. After his return to India, he started working to bring about a revolutionary change in the political situation in India.

He came to believe that the only way to free India from the British yoke was that the common people, and not just the elite that composed the erstwhile Congress, should embark upon a total revolution. Aurobindo espoused a threefold approach to this end:

1. To conduct secret revolutionary propaganda and develop organizations to prepare for an armed revolution.
2. To spread the idea of revolution and prepare the entire nation for independence.
3. To organise the people for non-cooperation and passive resistance against foreign rule.

== Anushilan Samiti and Jugantar Party ==
At the beginning of 20th century Bengal had become the central hub for voices against the British Rule and during his vacations to meet his family in Bengal, Aurobindo came in contact with many who shared his views. Aurobindo became inspired by the story of Bankim's novel Anandamath. Aurobindo frequently shared with his younger brother Barin his ideas of imparting martial and intellectual training to the youth of Bengal for the coming revolution; loosely like the sannyais of Anandamath who stir a rebellion against the British. This concept is rooted in Shakta philosophy.

Anushilan Samiti was founded as an attempt to organize Bengali youth through a program of physical fitness and spiritual training for a nationalist program. By 1902, Calcutta had three societies working under the umbrella of Anushilan Samity, a society earlier founded by a Calcutta barrister by the name of Pramatha Mitra. These included Mitra's own group, another led by a Bengali lady by the name of Sarala Devi, and a third one led by Aurobindo Ghosh. The Anushilan Samiti had Aurobindo and Deshabandhu Chittaranjan Das as the vice-presidents, Suren Tagore the treasurer. Jatindra Nath Banerjee (Niralamba Swami), Bagha Jatin, Bhupendra Nath Datta (Swami Vivekananda's brother), Barindra Ghosh were among other initial leaders. By 1905, the work of Aurobindo and his brother Barin Ghosh allowed Anushilan Samity to spread through Bengal.

When the first Partition of Bengal was announced in 1905, Aurobindo took an extended leave from the college in Baroda and dedicated himself to participate in anti-British activities in Bengal.

Barin who was an aggressive revolutionary in his own right prodded Aurobindo to write about a plan for a Monks' rebellion. In August 1905 Aurobindo published a blueprint for such a training facility called "Bhawani Mandir" (or Bhawani's temple). This plan and its logistics were later taken over by Barin when Aurobindo devoted himself to the mainstream of Politics.

Aurobindo provided the ideological foundation to the ultra-radical Jugantar party, as an offshoot of the Anushilan Samiti. The party was founded by Barin and Bhupendra Nath Dutta. Among the operational aims of this society was to sensitize and stimulate the disaffected youth of Bengal to the nationalist cause.

== Bande Mataram ==
The views of Tilak, Aurobindo and other aggressive nationalists, being radically different from those of the moderates, created fissures in the Congress and the debate for its future direction and control spilled into the public domain. To take the extremists' view to the public, Bipin Chandra Pal had founded the nationalist Bengali newspaper Bande Mataram. Pal invited Aurobindo to become its editor along with Pal. Pal after a few issues discontinued contributing to the paper. The paper rapidly became a major success. and the radical views finally found a popular voice. But as a result of its popularity and open espousal of aggressive methods, the paper came into frequent confrontation with the Raj.

In 1907 the British Government decided to prosecute the group behind Bande Mataram, for its constant propaganda against British rule. Notices were served for using language which was a "direct incentive to violence and lawlessness."

On 16 August, Aurobindo was sought for arrested by the Police. Aurobindo courted arrest and was released on monetary sureties. The sensational act and the events surrounding the arrest were seen as an episode of defiance against the empire and turned him into a national celebrity. Provincial and National press showered lavish praise on Aurobindo.Tagore wrote: "Rabindranath, O Aurobindo, bows to thee! O friend, my country's friend, O Voice incarnate, free, Of India's soul.... The fiery messenger that with the lamp of God hath come...Rabindranath, O Aurobindo, bows to thee".

The prosecution was unable to establish that Sri Aurobindo was the editor of the paper, and he was acquitted. Pal was sentenced to six months in prison for declining to depose. After the Bande Mataram Case, Sri Aurobindo became the recognised leader of aggressive nationalism in Bengal.

== National education ==
Aurobindo was a strong proponent of an indigenous system of national education. His experiences at Baroda university had convinced him about the shortcomings of the education system of the time. His views on national education frequently brought him in conflict with the moderates of Congress. When the Risley Circular banned the study or mention of politics from government aided educational institutes, Aurobindo along with others saw this as a direct challenge to his program of youth nationalism. He campaigned extensively to gain self-reliance on the front of education, writing articles about the circular and its implications. He, along with Rabindranath Tagore, Raja Subodh Chandra Mullick and Brajendra Kishore Roychowdhury decided that they would protest the partition of Bengal by setting up an institution that would challenge British rule by offering education to the masses "on national lines and under national control". The Bengal National College was set up with Aurobindo as its first principal.

Later, when he founded the newspaper Karmayogin, he expounded in detail his philosophy on education in the series titled A System of National Education.

== Alipore bomb case ==
The British had been keeping tabs on the activities of Barin and Aurobindo since the Bande Mataram episode. On 30 April 1908, Khudiram Bose and Prafulla Chaki, members of Barin's group, attempted to bomb Magistrate Kingsford's carriage in Alipore. They failed to discern between the identical carriages of the party and the bombs instead landed in the wrong carriage, killing two British women, the wife and daughter of another barrister. The British reaction was swift, with 33 suspects being rounded up within the next two days. Barin and Aurobindo were also arrested and put into prison. The ensuing trial lasted for a year. Aurobindo was acquitted. Khudiram Bose was found guilty and later hanged. Barin was sentenced to death, but this sentence was later commuted to life imprisonment (He was released in 1920).

Aurobindo came out of prison and delivered the famous Uttarpara Speech. A few months after the end of his incarceration, and few other anti-British activities, Aurobindo retired from active politics and sailed to Pondicherry, where he would spend the rest of his life.
