= Ann Lambton =

British historian

Ann Lambton OBE, FBA
- Born: Ann Katharine Swynford Lambton; 8 February 1912; Newmarket, Suffolk
- Died: 19 July 2008 (aged 96); Wooler, Northumberland
- Education: SOAS University of London
- Occupation: Historian
- Father: George Lambton

Ann Katharine Swynford Lambton (8 February 1912 – 19 July 2008), usually known as A.K.S. Lambton or "Nancy" Lambton, was a British historian, expert on medieval and early modern Persian history, Persian language, Islamic political theory, and Persian social organisation. She was an acknowledged authority on land tenure and reform in Iran (including Saljuq, Mongol, Safavid and Qajar administration and institutions, and local and tribal histories).

== Life ==
Lambton was born in 1912 in Newmarket, Suffolk. She was the elder daughter of the Hon. George Lambton, younger son of the 2nd Earl of Durham) and his wife Cicely Margaret Horner (1882–1972). Through the influence of Edward Denison Ross, a family friend, she studied Persian at SOAS under Ross and Hamilton Gibb, and others (Arthur Tritton, Vladimir Minorsky, and Hassan Taqizadeh).

From 1939 to 1945, Lambton was Press attaché of the British Legation to Tehran, and then Professor of Persian at SOAS from 1953 to 1979, succeeding Arthur Arberry as holder of that chair. In 1942, she was awarded the OBE and, later, honorary DLitt degrees from the University of Durham and the University of Cambridge. She was also an honorary fellow of New Hall, Cambridge, SOAS and the University of London. She wrote several books on subjects ranging from Persian grammar and vocabulary to Qajar land reform. Ann Lambton played a role in the overthrow of Mohammed Mossadegh. After the decision to nationalize Iran's oil interests in 1951, she advised the British government to undermine the authority of Mossadegh's regime. She proposed that Oxford University professor R. C. Zaehner should go to Iran and begin covert operations. In 1953, with the help of the CIA, the regime of Mossadegh was overthrown and the Shah, Mohammad Reza Shah Pahlavi, was restored to the throne.

As Professor Emeritus of the Diocese of Newcastle and Chairman of the Iran Diocesan Association, Lambton served on the Middle East Committee and advised Archbishops on inter-faith matters. She delivered Lent lectures biannually to clergy and laity for many years. She was later awarded the Cross of St Augustine in 2004 by the Archbishop of Canterbury in acknowledgement of her work and commitment to Christianity and the Church of England. She was an honorary Life Member of the Middle East Studies Association of North America. At the University of Durham, the Centre of Iranian Studies has instituted an annual Prof. A. K. S. Lambton honorary lectureship. Prof. Lambton delivered the inaugural lecture in this series in 2001.

Lambton died at her home in Wooler, Northumberland, on 19 July 2008 at the age of 96 after a long illness.

== Obituaries ==
- Arbuthnott, H.; Professor Ann Lambton: Persian scholar, Obituary, The Times, 23 July 2008 .
- McLachlan, K. S.; Professor AKS Lambton, Obituary, Telegraph, 8 August 2008.
- Morgan, David; Ann Lambton, The Guardian, 15 August 2008,
- Waghmar, Burzine K.; Professor Ann Lambton: Persianist unrivalled in the breadth of her scholarship whose association with Soas was long and illustrious, Obituary, The Independent, 1 August 2008.
