= Bhawani Mandir =

Bhawani Mandir (Temple of Goddess Bhawani) was a political pamphlet penned anonymously by Indian nationalist Aurobindo Ghosh in 1905. The pamphlet was created at the time of the partition of Bengal and penned during Aurobindo's career in the Baroda State service. The pamphlet ostensibly called for the establishment of an order of monkhood which would build a temple to the Hindu Mother Goddess Bhawani (or Shakti) who was intended to represent the nationhood of India, and dedicate themselves to service in her name. It drew inspiration from Anandamath, an 1882 novel by Bengali author Bankim Chandra Chattopadhyay set in the backdrop of the Monk's rebellion early in the history of East India Company's settlements in Bengal. However, departing from Anandamath, which only portrays the land as the holy mother, Aurobindo explicitly associated the identity of Goddess Bhawani to the concept of nation. Authors such as Jussi Hanimaki and Bernhard Blumenau argue this was intended to link the symbolism and messages of Anandamath, widely read in Bengal, to the symbolism of Maratha king Shivaji who was widely admired in Maharashtra.

It is a political manifesto where Ghose denounces the lack of political willpower and unity among Indians. He cites the example of Japan which transformed itself to compete with European powers. He urged Indians to devote themselves fully to the service of the Nation-Goddess. He proposed a revolutionary secret society "Bhawani Mandir" deep in the mountains to train patriotic 'ascetics' to selflessly serve the nation, helping it to achieve freedom.
