= Robert Orsi =

American professor

Robert Anthony Orsi (born 1953) is a scholar of American history and Catholic studies who is the Grace Craddock Nagle Chair professor at Northwestern University.

== Biography ==
Orsi was born and raised in the Bronx, New York City. He majored in religion and sociology at Trinity College in Connecticut and graduated salutatorian in 1975, receiving both a Danforth and Watson Scholarship. He attended graduate school in religion at Yale University where his prize-winning dissertation formed the basis of his first book, The Madonna of 115th Street.

He taught at Fordham University at Lincoln Center from 1981 to 1988, at Indiana University from 1988 to 2001, and Harvard University and Harvard Divinity School from 2001 to 2007. At Harvard, he became chairman of the Committee on the Study of Religion. In this position, he sought to encourage more undergraduate students to take courses in the study of religion and attempted to establish a more distinct presence for the study of religion in the Harvard Faculty of Arts and Sciences (FAS). He argued that "religious studies needs to have a presence in FAS that is separate and distinct" from Harvard Divinity School, arguing that in contrast to the Divinity School's theological approach, "the study of religion is a humanities or social science discipline. The people who are most affiliated with the study of religion... study it from historical-cultural points of view."

In 2007, Orsi resigned from his position at Harvard. He attributed this decision to the fact that the Divinity School had not offered a faculty position to his wife, Christine Helmer. In his words: "They had offered my wife three years of full teaching, [but] actually cut it down to half-time. When they did that, I simply couldn't stay here anymore." His role of committee chair was taken by Diana L. Eck, who had previously chaired it between 1990 and 1998.

=== Northwestern University ===
Orsi then gained a chaired position in religious studies with a joint appointment in history at Northwestern University. There, he is the Grace Craddock Nagle Chair of Catholic Studies. From 2020 to 2021, he was a Faculty Fellow at the University of Notre Dame. Orsi's wife was also offered a position at Northwestern, as a full professor in religion with a joint appointment in German.

He is the editor of The Cambridge Companion to Religious Studies (2011) and the author of History and Presence (2016).

== Arguments and views ==
Orsi has been noted for a controversy concerning methodology in the field of religious studies between himself and Russell McCutcheon. This controversy centered on a rather polemical exchange between the two, with Orsi referring to McCutcheon's book, The Discipline of Religion, as "chilling". Orsi also made the comment, "the assumption appears to be that the scholar of religion by virtue of his or her normative epistemology, theoretical acuity, and political knowingness, has the authority and the right to make the lives of others the objects of his or her scrutiny. He or she theorizes them." McCutcheon responded with a paper included in the Journal of the American Academy of Religion entitled, "It's a Lie. There's No Truth in It! It's a Sin! On the Limits of the Humanistic Study of Religion and the Costs of Saving Others from Themselves".

== Awards ==
- 2000 Guggenheim Fellowship
- 1999 National Endowment for the Humanities Fellowship
- Fulbright Fellowship
- John Gilmary Shea Prize from the American Catholic Historical Association for The Madonna of 115th Street
- Jesuit National Book Award, for The Madonna of 115th Street
- Merle Curti Award in American Social History from the Organization of American Historians, for Thank You, Saint Jude
- Award for Excellence in the Study of Religion from the American Academy of Religion, for Between Heaven and Earth

== Works ==
- "When 2+2=5", The American Scholar, Spring 2007
- History and Presence. The Belknap Press of Harvard University Press. 2016. ISBN 9780674984592.
- Between Heaven and Earth: The Religious Worlds People Make and the Scholars Who Study Them. Princeton University Press. 2005. ISBN 978-0-691-04903-8.
- The Madonna of 115th Street: Faith and Community in Italian Harlem, 1880-1950. Yale University Press. 2010. ISBN 978-0-300-09135-9. (1st edition 1985; 2nd edition 2002),
- Thank You, Saint Jude: Women's Devotion to the Patron Saint of Hopeless Causes. Yale University Press. 1998. ISBN 978-0-300-07659-2.

=== Edited ===
- Robert A. Orsi, ed. (1999). Gods of the City: Religion and the American Urban Landscape. Indiana University Press. ISBN 978-0-253-21276-4.
- Melissa R. Katz; Robert A. Orsi, eds. (2001). Divine mirrors: the Virgin Mary in the visual arts. Oxford University Press. ISBN 978-0-19-514557-1.
