= Geoffrey Parrinder =

English professor of religion and author (1910–2005)

- Born: April 10, 1910
- Died: June 16, 2005 (aged 95)
- Occupations: academic and minister

Edward Geoffrey Simons Parrinder (April 10, 1910 – June 16, 2005) — known as E.G. Parrinder or Geoffrey Parrinder — was a professor of Comparative Religion at King's College London, a Methodist minister, and the author of over 30 books on world religions. At least one, What World Religions Teach Us (1968), achieved bestseller status. He was an authority, and pioneering researcher, on West African indigenous religions.

== Biography ==
Parrinder was born in Hertfordshire, England; he studied for Methodist ministry at Richmond College and the Faculté de Théologie Protestante in Montpellier, France.

Between 1933 and 1940 he worked as a missionary in Benin and Côte d'Ivoire, and he spent another year there after WWII. He became an authority on indigenous West African religions.

After serving in the Channel Islands and publishing his first book, he travelled to Nigeria to teach at the new University College of Ibadan, Nigeria.

In 1958 he returned to England; from then until his retirement in 1977, he taught the comparative study of religion at King's College London. Among his students there was the future Anglican Archbishop Desmond Tutu.

He was also a co-founder, secretary and president of the British Association for the History of Religions.

He traveled widely in Africa, and in India, Pakistan, Ceylon, Burma, Israel, Jordan and Turkey and held lecturing appointments in Australia, India and America and at Oxford.

== Books ==
- West African Religion: Illustrated from the Beliefs and Practices of Yoruba, Ewe, Akan and Kindred Peoples (1949); London: Epworth Press
  - 2nd edition (1961) as West African Religion: A Study of the Beliefs and Practices of Akan, Ewe, Yoruba, Ibo and Kindred Peoples
- African Psychology (1951)
- Religion In An African City (1953)
- African Traditional Religion, London: SPCK, (1954) .
  - 2nd edition (19??)
  - 3rd edition (1970); Harper Forum Books/Greenwood Pub. Group ISBN 0-8371-3401-3
- The Story Of Ketu (1956)
  - 2nd edition as The Story Of Ketu: An Ancient Yoruba Kingdom (1967); Ibadan University Press
- Witchcraft: European and African (1958), London: Faber & Faber, (1963), (1970) ISBN 0-571-09060-5
  - Also published as Witchcraft: A Critical Study Of The Belief In Witchcraft From The Records Of Witch Hunting In Europe Yesterday And Africa Today
- An Introduction to Asian Religions (1958); S.P.C.K
- The Bible and Polygamy: A Study of Hebrew and Christian Teaching (1958); S.P.C.K
- A Daily Bible and Prayerbook (1960); S.P.C.K
- Worship in the World's Religions (1961, 1974)
- Comparative Religion (1962); Allen & Unwin
  - 2nd edition (1975); Praeger
- The Faiths of Mankind: A Guide to The World's Living Religions (1965); Crowell
  - Revised (1967) as The Handbook of Living Religions Arthur Barker Ltd (England)
  - Revised (1974) as The World's Living Religions; Pan Macmillan
- A Book of World Religions (1965); Hulton Educational Publications
- Jesus in the Qur'an (1965); New York: Barnes & Noble; London: Faber & Faber
  - as e-book (1995); Oneworld Publications ISBN 1-85168-094-2
- The Christian Approach to the Animist (1966); Edinburgh House Press [Pamphlet]
- The Christian Debate: Light from the East (1966); Doubleday & Co
- African Mythology, Hamlyn Publ Group Ltd (1967), ISBN 0-600-00042-7
- The Significance of the Bhagavad-Gītā for Christian Theology [Lecture] (1968); Dr. Williams's Trust
- What World Religions Teach Us (1968)
- Religion in Africa (1969); Penguin
  - 2nd edition (1976) as Africa's Three Religions; Sheldon Press
- Avatar and Incarnation: A Comparison of Indian & Christian Beliefs, London: Faber & Faber, (1970), Oxford University Press. (1982) ISBN 0-19-520361-5
- Man and His Gods: Encyclopaedia of the World's Religions (1971)
  - U.S. title: Religions of the World: From Primitive Beliefs to Modern Faiths; Madison Square Press
  - Revised edition (1983) as World Religions: From Ancient History to the Present; Facts on File, ISBN 0-87196-129-6
- Upanishads, Gita, and Bible: A Comparative Study of Hindu and Christian Scriptures, Harper & Row (1972), ISBN 0-06-131660-1
- A Dictionary of Non-Christian Religions, Westminster John Knox Press (1973), ISBN 0-664-20981-5
- Right and Wrong (1973)
- The Indestructible Soul: The Nature of Man and Life after Death in Indian Thought (1973); Allen & Unwin
- The Bagavad Gita: A Verse Translation, Sheldon Press: London (1974), ISBN 0-85969-018-0, Dutton Books (1975), ISBN 0-525-47390-4, Oneworld Publications (1996) ISBN 1-85168-117-5
- Something After Death? (1974); NCEC
- The Wisdom of the Forest: Selections from the Hindu Upanishads, New York: New Directions, (1976), ISBN 0-8112-0606-8
- Mysticism in the World's Religions Sheldon Press in UK: (1976), ISBN 0-85969-085-7. Oxford University Press in USA: 1977, ISBN 0-19-502185-1. Oneworld Publications: 1995, ISBN 1-85168-101-9
- The Wisdom of the Early Buddhists (1977); Directions
- Sex in the World's Religions, Oxford University Press. (1980), ISBN 0-19-520202-3
  - Revised edition (1996) as Sexual Morality in the World's Religions, Oneworld Publications ISBN 1-85168-108-6
- Encountering World Religions: Questions of Religious Truth, Crossroad Pub. Co. (1987), ISBN 0-8245-0826-2
- A Dictionary of Religious and Spiritual Quotations (1990); Routledge
  - 2nd edition (2000) as The Routledge Dictionary of Religious and Spiritual Quotations; Routledge ISBN 0-415-23393-3
- Collins Dictionary of Religious & Spiritual Quotations (1992); HarperCollins
- Son of Joseph: The Parentage of Jesus, T. & T. Clark Publishers, Ltd. (1993), ISBN 0-567-29213-4
- A Concise Encyclopedia of Christianity (1998); Oneworld Publications ISBN 1-85168-174-4
- The Sayings Of The Buddha (1998); Ecco
- Wisdom of Jesus, Oneworld Publications (2000), ISBN 1-85168-225-2
- In the Belly of the Snake: West Africa Over Sixty Years Ago, Methodist Publishing House (2000), ISBN 1-85852-179-3
- West African Psychology: a Comparative Study of Psychological and Religious Thought, James Clarke Company, (2002), ISBN 0-227-17053-9
