= An der Zeitmauer =

1959 book by Ernst Jünger

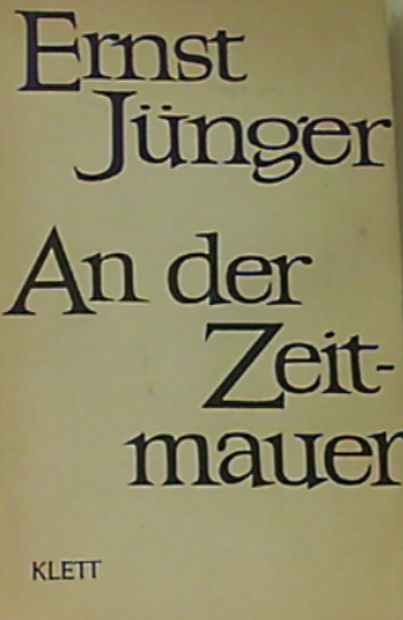
- Author: Ernst Jünger
- Language: German
- Publisher: Ernst Klett Verlag
- Publication date: 1959
- Publication place: West Germany
- Media type: Print (Hardcover and Paperback)
- Pages: 314 (first edition)

An der Zeitmauer ("At the time wall" in German) is a 1959 book by Ernst Jünger. It discusses the relationship between the Earth and mankind, and how it is challenged by emerging technology.

== Background ==
Jünger wrote An der Zeitmauer as a complement to his 1932 book The Worker. It reworks and incorporates considerations from his 1951 essay Über die Linie, reformulating the "line" of the older essay as a "time wall". The trigger behind these considerations were the potential of new technology, notably the possibility of a doomsday scenario due to nuclear warfare or developments following James Watson's and Francis Crick's 1953 publication of the structure of the DNA molecule. For Jünger, this placed humanity on the trajectory toward a "line" or "wall" which, if humanity were to survive beyond it, could end modernity and its conception of "world history", prompting a different conception of time and history.

== Summary ==
The first chapter "Fremde Vögel" ("Strange Birds") discusses an emerging global change to the Earth and humanity. The second chapter "Messbare und Schicksalszeit" ("Measurable and Fate Time") draws out a distinction between a scientific and an astrological conception of time and the world. The next chapters, "Humane Einteilungen" and "Siderische Einteilungen" ("Humane Classifications" and "Sidereal Classifications"), consider mankind and its place in cosmological contexts. The fifth and final chapter, "Urgrund und Person" ("Primordial Foundation and Person"), discusses the individual and its relationship with faith and religious institutions.

== Arguments ==
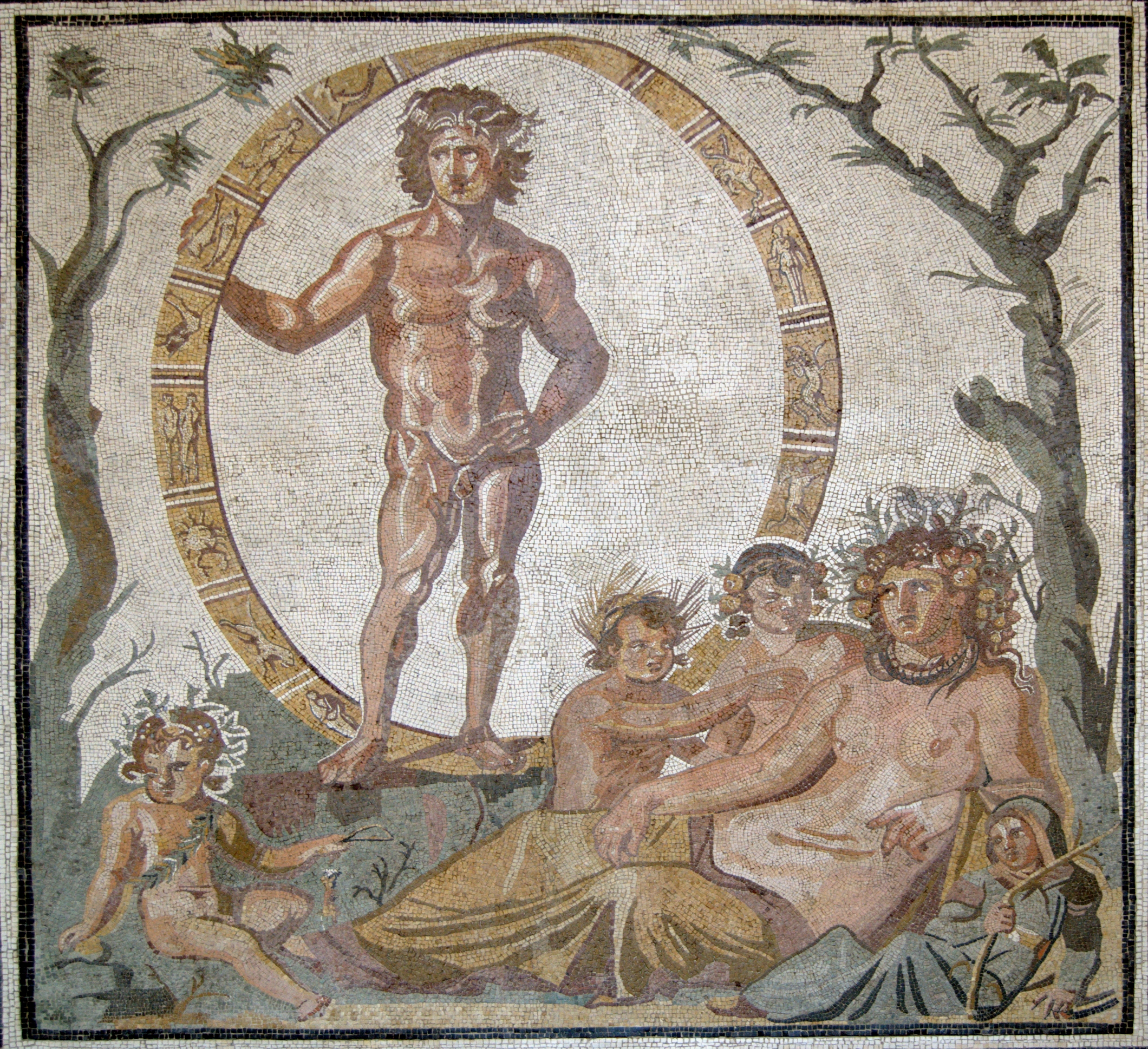
Aion and Gaia with four children, Roman mosaic from the third century BC

The main thesis is that mankind the Earth—Gaia—are facing a turning point. Jünger leaves open whether mankind will be able to make a leap over the "time wall", or if it ultimately will be repelled by the Earth. Jünger employs a mythic view of the situation with emerging technology such as the possibility to manipulate the human genome. He argues that Gaia's true consort is not the titanic or promethean mind of scientific progress, but the mind as a cosmic power.

According to Jünger's philosophy of technology, the overall perceived pattern of human experience, the Gestalt, is changing. The Gestalt has previously been possible for humans to relate to, but impossible to accurately name or define, thus it has been a metaphysical concept. Technology is creating a non-metaphysical Gestalt where everything is quantified. Jünger believes that a fruitful unification of the two perspectives is possible.

Unlike in The Worker, which relies on the nihilist conceptions of Friedrich Nietzsche and the eternal return, Jünger here supports a "spiral theory of history". He also criticises Oswald Spengler's study of the cycles of civilisation as insufficient, as it only points out similarities without addressing the source of the similarities.

== Reception ==
Hermann Hesse reviewed the book for Stuttgarter Zeitung in 1960 and recognised in its pages his own worries about the destructive dimension of technology. Hesse wrote: "To what extent now Jünger's writings and prognoses are 'correct', or what valid points can be brought against them for this or that position, does not affect me. The dispute over this will be literature and twaddle. For me it is fully enough to have taken part of this display and spent fruitful days with it." Elfriede Jelinek has called it Jünger's "intellectually perhaps most profound work".

== See also ==
- Anthropogenic hazard
