= Bigatus =

Type of Roman denarius

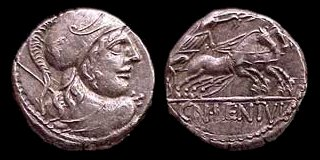
Victory in a biga on the reverse of a denarius (bigatus), with the head of Mars

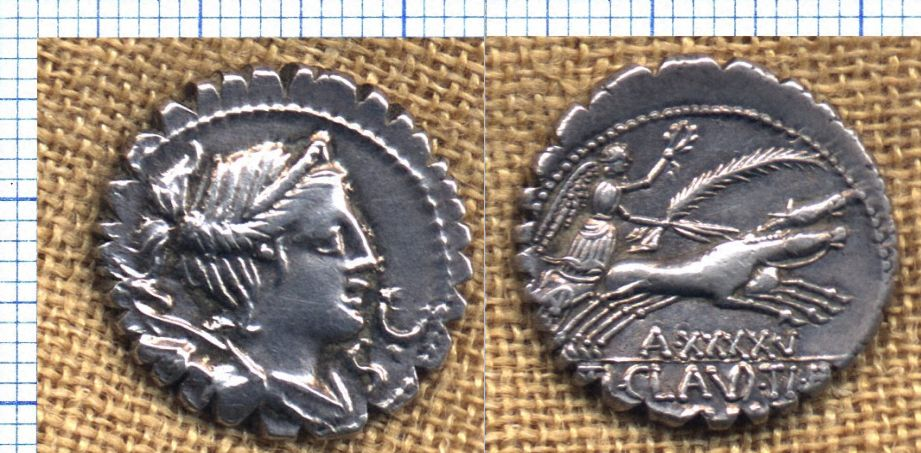
Serratus depicting Diana, with Victory driving a biga

In the currency of ancient Rome, the bigatus (plural bigati) is a type of denarius stamped on the reverse with a biga, a two-horse chariot. It began to appear in the first decade of the 2nd century BC as an alternative to the victoriatus, and most numismatists believe that it was not used before 190 BC. A denarius with a four-horse chariot (quadriga) had already been in use for some time; see quadrigatus, likewise named for its chariot icon and depicting in addition the Dioscuri.

The first bigatus depicted Luna in her two-horse chariot. It continued in use along with the Dioscuri quadrigatus until 170 BC, when the denarius was temporarily suppressed. The denarius was revived around 157 BC with the Dioscuri type and a new bigatus depicting Victory in her biga, probably to commemorate Rome's dominance following the Battle of Pydna. Tacitus and Plutarch mention a statue of Victory in a biga.

The date at which the bigatus began to be issued is complicated by the uncertain usage of the word bigati by the Augustan historian Livy. In writing about the events of 216 BC, before bigati are known to have come into circulation, Livy uses the word to refer to silver money taken as spoils in Cisalpine Gaul or Hispania, and then displayed at triumphs between 197 and 190 BC. Bigati may be used loosely for denarii, and not the specific type. It has also been conjectured that bigatus had become a slang term for denarii in a broader sense of "two-horsed," which might also apply to the image of the Dioscuri (Castor and Pollux) as horsemen. None of these explanations has been universally satisfying.

In his ethnography Germania, Tacitus (56–117 AD) notes that while most Germanic peoples in his day still relied on barter, those along the borders of the Empire engaged in commerce and used currency, but trusted only the value of "old and well-known" coins such as bigati and serrati, the latter being those with serrated edges. Since plated coins had begun to circulate during the time of Julius Caesar and after (see fourrée), they had cause to be wary; however, other older coins should also have relieved them of their concerns, and the reasons for their preference are unclear, especially since plated bigati existed.
