= Biga (chariot) =

Ancient Roman two-horse chariot

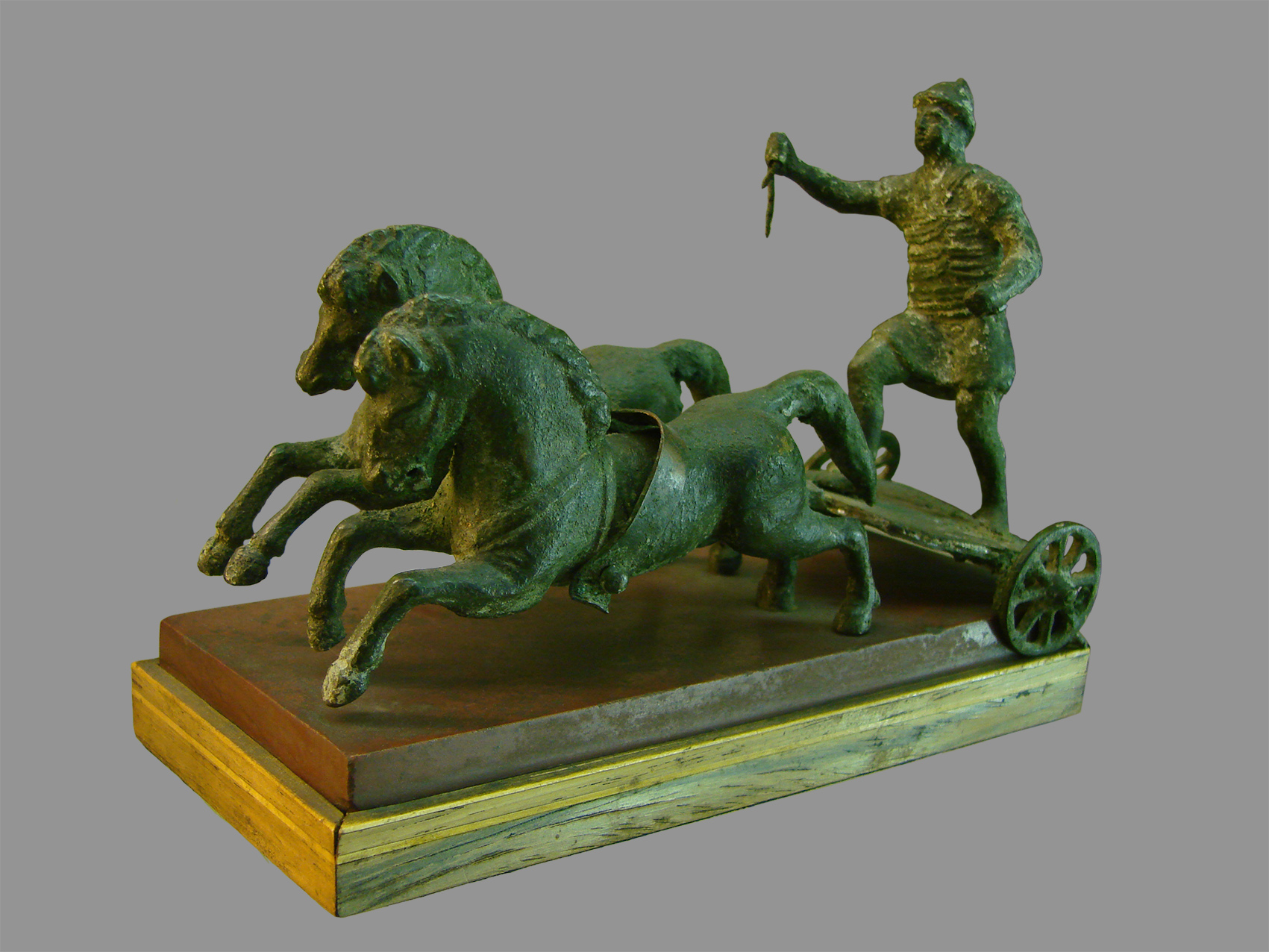
Bronze figurine of a biga from Roman Gaul; the chariot itself is missing the breastwork

The biga (Latin; pl.: bigae) is the two-horse chariot as used in ancient Rome for sport, transportation, and ceremonies. Other animals may replace horses in art and occasionally for actual ceremonies. The term biga is also used by modern scholars for the similar chariots of other Indo-European cultures, particularly the two-horse chariot of the ancient Greeks and Celts. The driver of a biga is a bigarius.

Other Latin words that distinguish chariots by the number of animals yoked as a team are quadriga, a four-horse chariot used for racing and associated with the Roman triumph; triga, or three-horse chariot, probably driven for ceremonies more often than racing (see Trigarium); and seiugis or seiuga, the six-horse chariot, more rarely raced and requiring a high degree of skill from the driver. The biga and quadriga are the most common types.

Two-horse chariots are a common icon on Roman coins; see bigatus, a type of denarius so called because it depicted a biga. In the iconography of religion and cosmology, the biga represents the moon, as the quadriga does the sun.

== Greek and Indo-European background ==
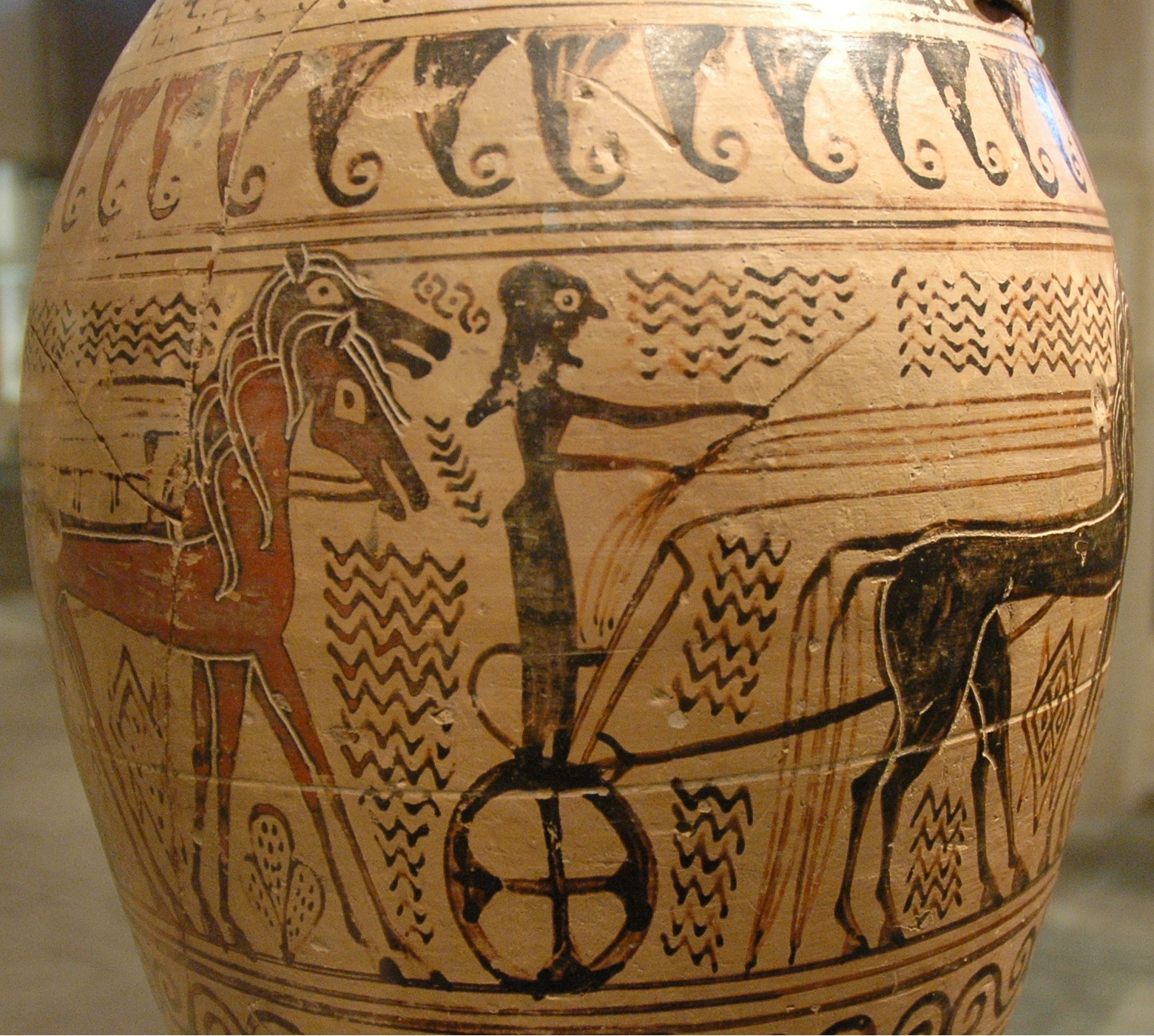
Procession of two-horses chariots on a loutrophoros, c. 690 BC

The earliest reference to a chariot race in Western literature is an event in the funeral games of Patroclus in the Iliad. In Homeric warfare, elite warriors were transported to the battlefield in two-horse chariots, but fought on foot; the chariot was then used for pursuit or flight. Most Bronze Age chariots uncovered by archaeologists in Peloponnesian Greece are bigae.

The date at which chariot races were introduced at the Olympian Games is recorded by later sources as 680 BC, when quadrigae competed. Races on horseback were added in 648. At Athens, two-horse chariot races were a part of athletic competitions from the 560s onward, but were still not a part of the Olympian Games. Bigae drawn by mules competed in the 70th Olympiad (500 BC), but they were no longer part of the games after the 84th Olympiad (444 BC). Not until 408 BC did bigae races begin to be featured at Olympia.

In myth, the biga often functions structurally to create a complementary pair or to link opposites. The chariot of Achilles in the Iliad (16.152) was drawn by two immortal horses and a third who was mortal; at 23.295, a mare is yoked with a stallion. The team of Adrastos included the immortal "superhorse" Areion and the mortal Kairos. A yoke of two horses is associated with the Indo-European concept of the Heavenly Twins, one of whom is mortal, represented among the Greeks by Castor and Pollux, the Dioscuri, who were known for horsemanship.

== Bigae at the races ==
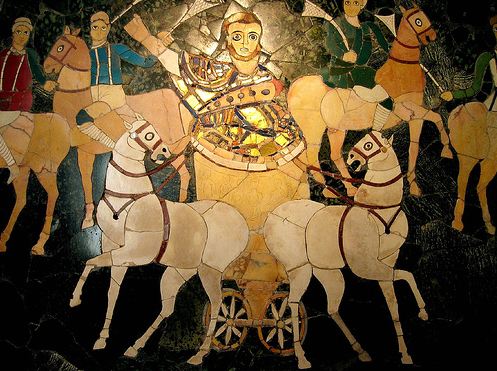
The consul advances in his biga at the pompa circensis (4th century, opus sectile from the Basilica of Junius Bassus)

Horse- and chariot-races were part of the ludi, sacred games held during Roman religious festivals, from Archaic times. A magistrate who presented games was entitled to ride in a biga. The sacral meaning of the races, though diminished over time, was preserved by iconography in the Circus Maximus, Rome's main racetrack.

Inscriptions referring to the bigarius as young suggest that a racing driver had to gain experience with a two-horse team before graduating to a quadriga.

=== Construction ===
A main source for the construction of racing bigae is a number of bronze figurines found throughout the Roman Empire, a particularly detailed example of which is held by the British Museum. Other sources are reliefs and mosaics. These show a lightweight frame, to which a minimal shell of fabric or leather was lashed. The center of gravity was low, and the wheels were relatively small, around 65 cm in diameter in proportion to a body 60 cm wide and 55 cm deep, with a breastwork of about 70 cm in height. The wheels may have been rimmed with iron, but otherwise metal fittings are kept to a minimum. The design facilitated speed, maneuverability and stability.

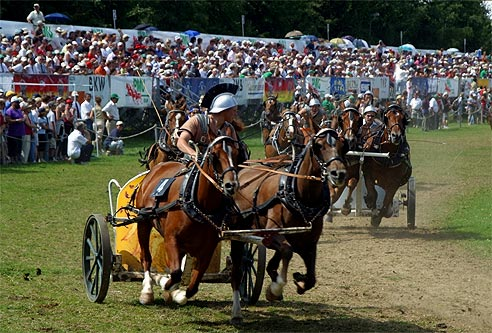
Modern reenactment of a biga race

The weight of the vehicle has been estimated at 25–30 kg, with a maximum manned weight of 100 kg. The biga is typically built with a single draught pole for a double yoke, while two poles are used for a quadriga. The chariot for a two-horse racing team is not thought to differ otherwise from that drawn by a four-horse team, and so the horses of a biga pulled 50 kg each, while those of the quadriga pulled 25 kg each.

The models or statuettes of bigae were art objects, toys, or collector's items. They are perhaps comparable to the modern hobby of model trains.

== Mythological and ceremonial use ==
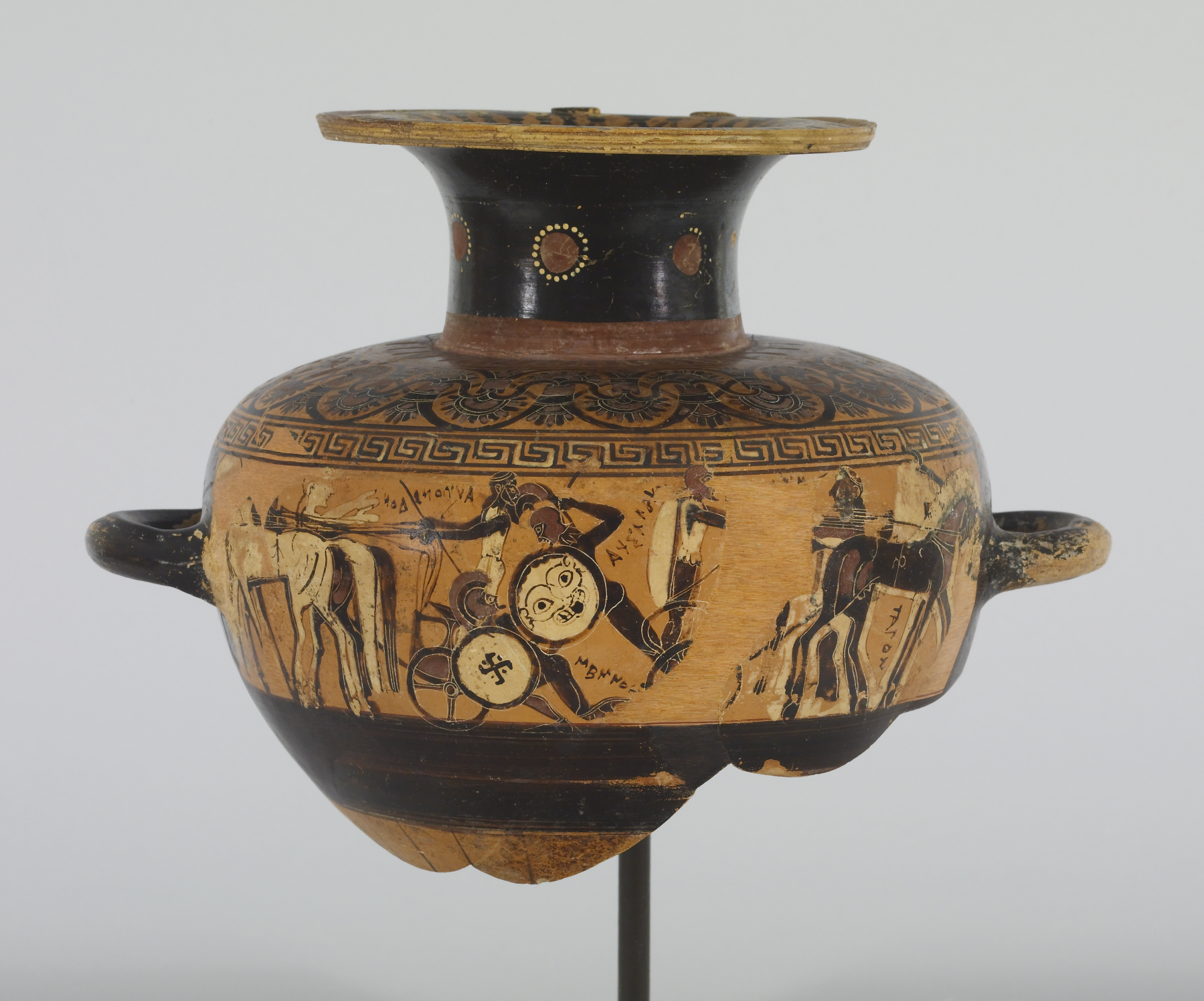
The bigae of Achilles and Memnon, each drawn by one white horse and one black horse (hydria, 575–550 BC)

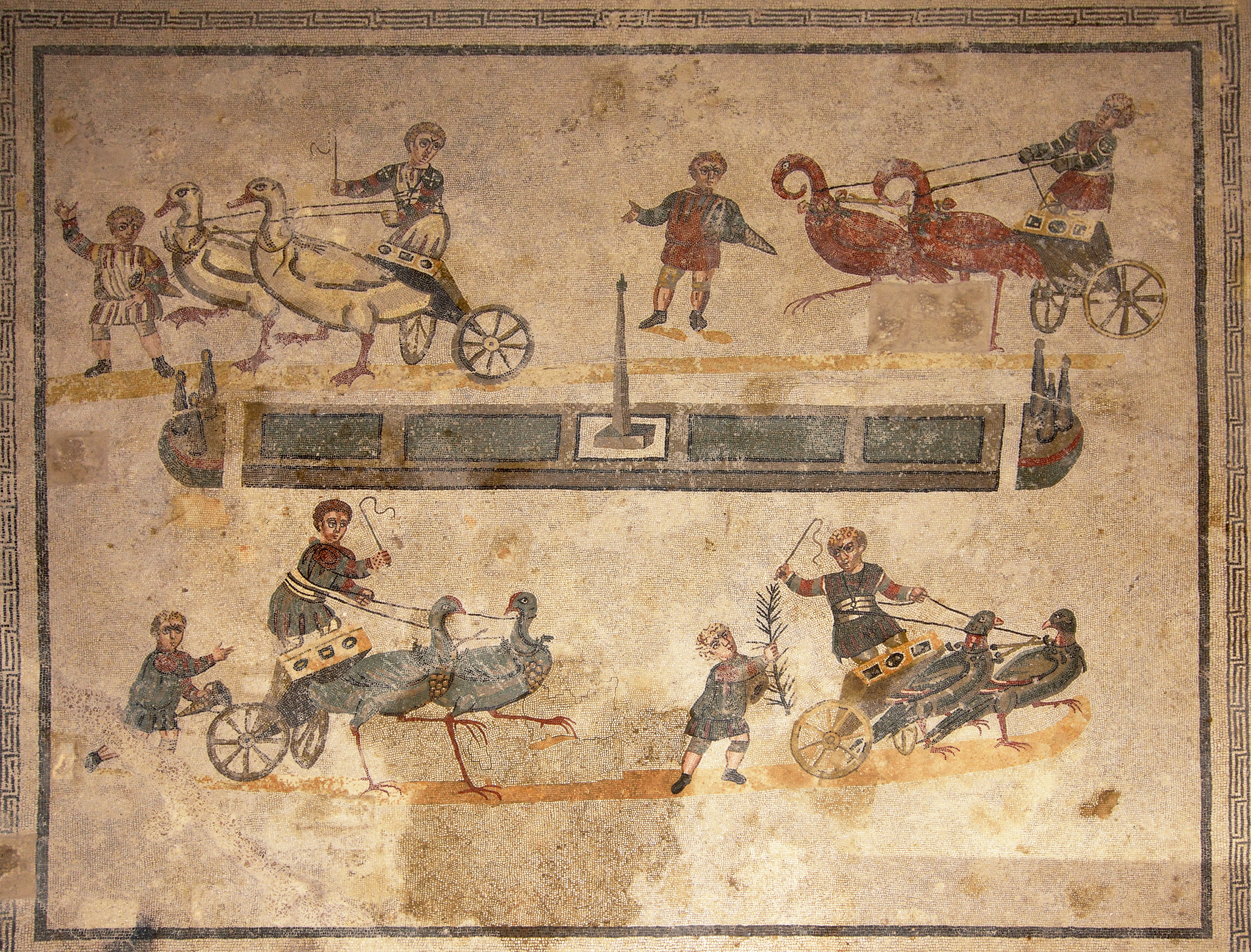
Mosaic from the Villa Romana del Casale showing boys racing bigae drawn by birds around a circus track

In his Etymologiae, Isidore of Seville explains the cosmic symbolism of chariot racing, and notes that while the quadriga, or four-horse chariot, represents the sun and its course through the four seasons, the biga represents the moon, "because it travels on a twin course with the sun, or because it is visible both by day and by night – for they yoke together one black horse and one white." Chariots frequently appear in Roman art as allegories of the Sun and Moon, particularly in reliefs and mosaics, in contexts that are readily distinguishable from depictions of real-world charioteers in the circus.

Luna in her biga drawn by horses or oxen was an element of Mithraic iconography, usually in the context of the tauroctony. In the Mithraeum of S. Maria Capua Vetere, a wall painting that uniquely focuses on Luna alone shows one of the horses of the team as light in color, with the other a dark brown. It has been suggested that the duality of the horses drawing a biga can also represent Plato's metaphor of the charioteer who must control a soul divided by genesis and apogenesis.

Greek and Roman art depicts deities driving two-yoke chariots drawn by a number of animals. A biga of oxen was driven by Hecate, the chthonic aspect of the Triple Goddess in complement with the "horned" or crescent-crowned Diana and Luna, to whom the biga was sacred. Triptolemus is depicted on Roman coins as driving a serpent-drawn biga as he sows grain in response to Demeter's appeal to him to teach mankind the skill of agriculture, such as on an Alexandrine drachma.

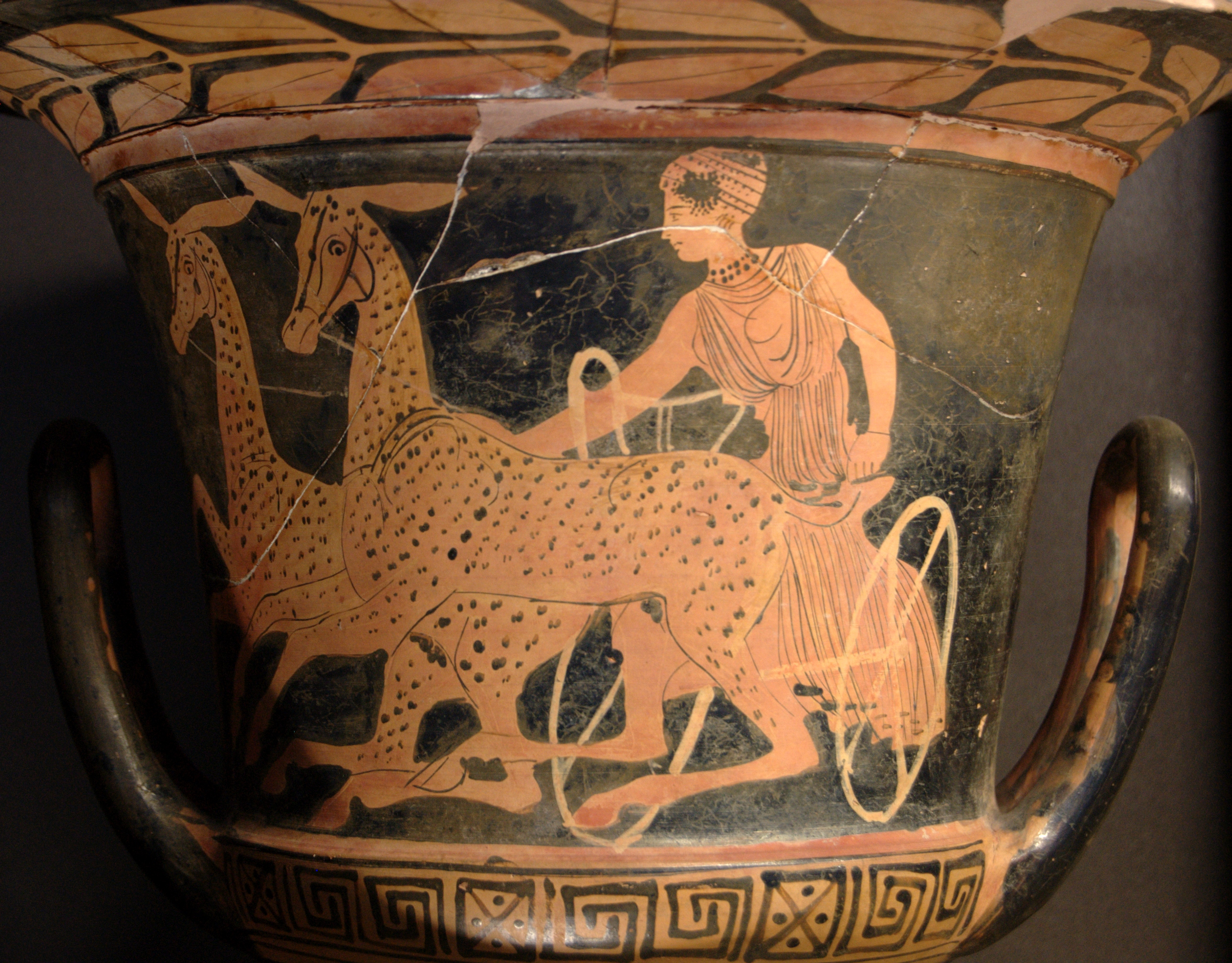
Biga of Artemis drawn by hinds (Boeotian red-figure kylix, 450–425 BC)

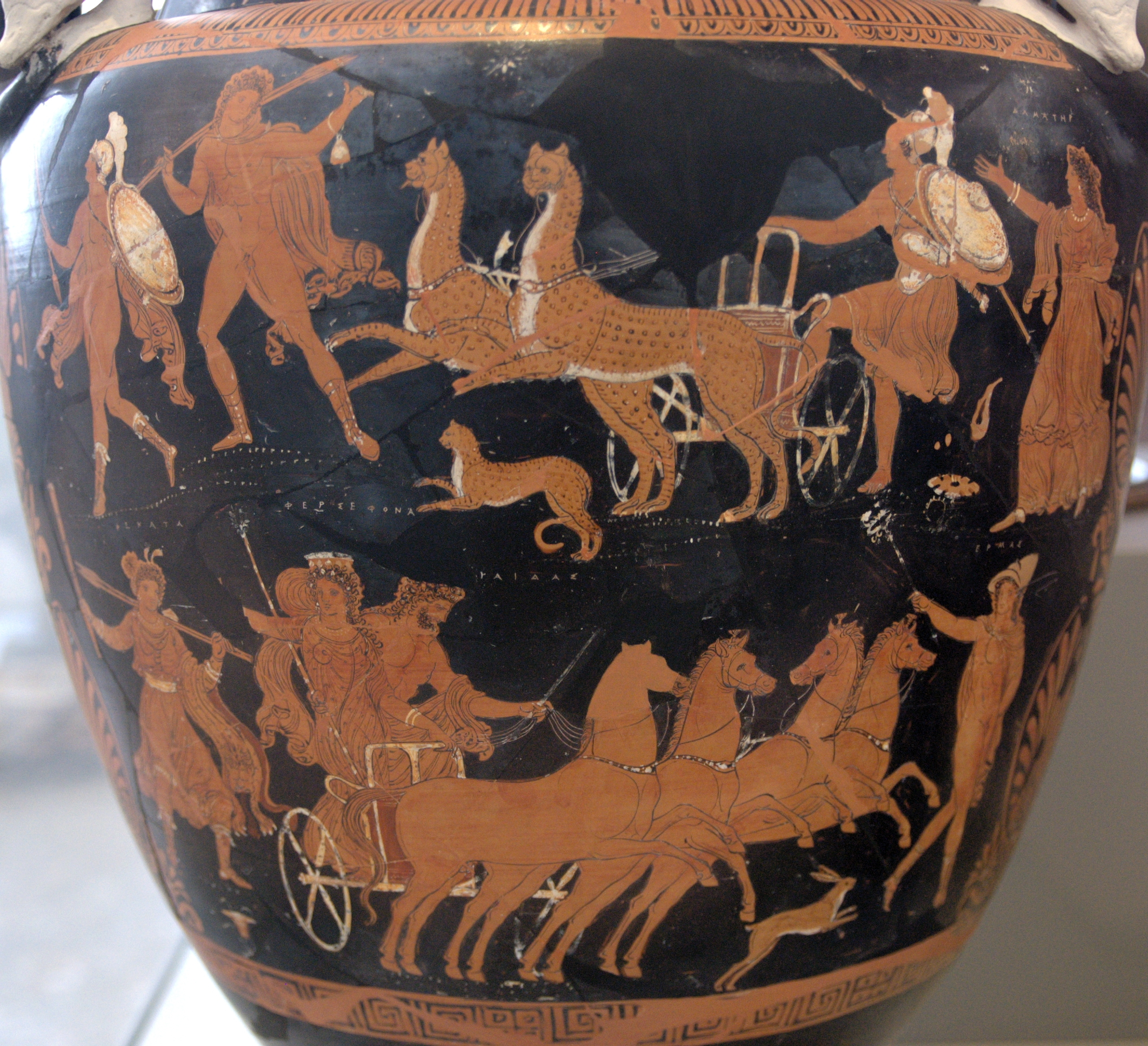
Leopard-drawn biga in a scene from the Mysteries (Apulian red-figure volute-krater, c. 340 BC)

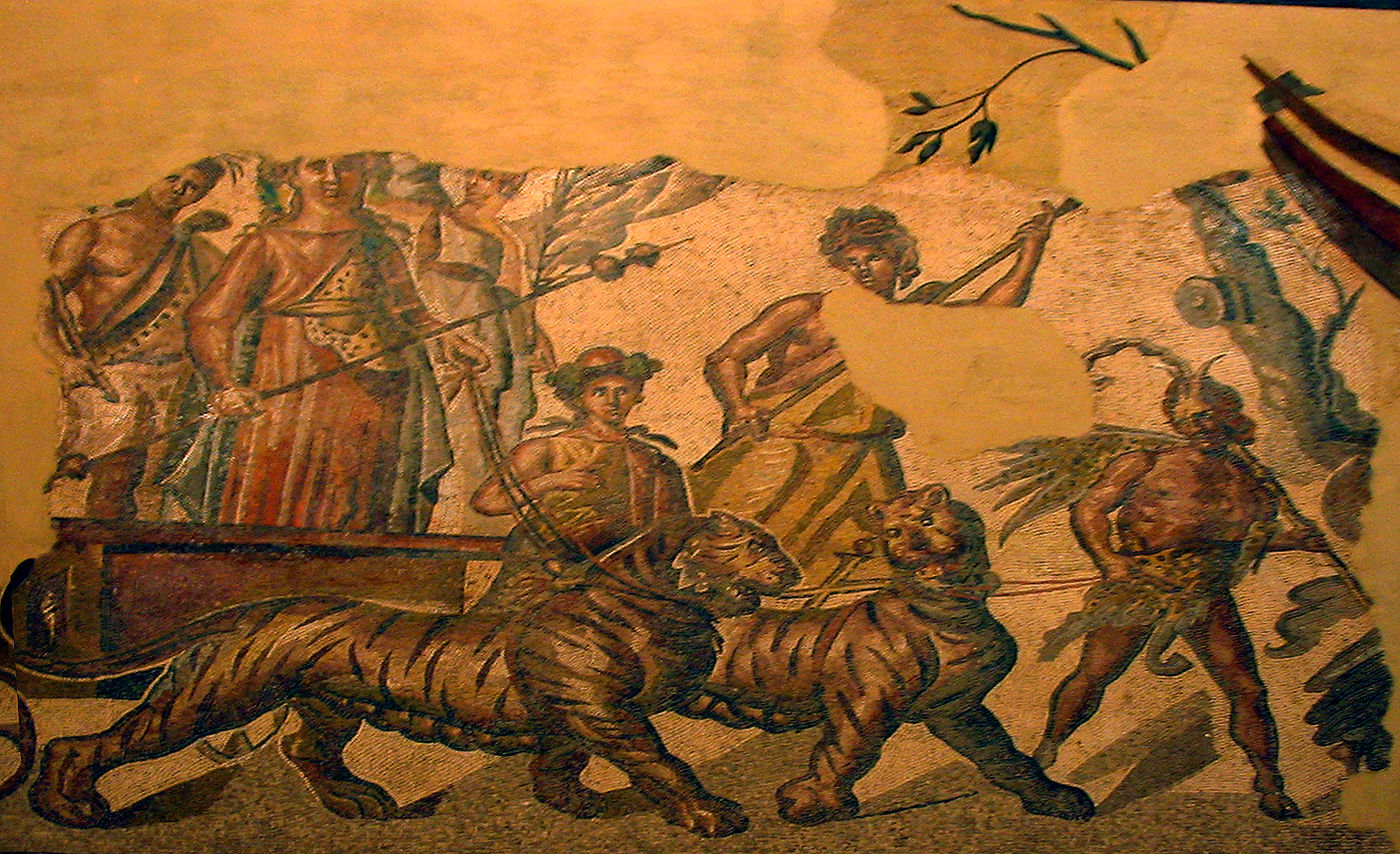
Pair of tigers drawing the chariot of Dionysus (mosaic, Roman Spain)

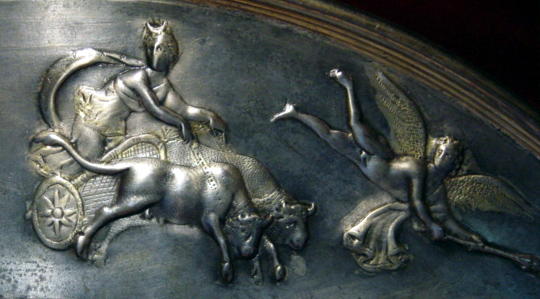
Ox-drawn biga of Luna or Diana (Parabiago patera, 4th century)

In his chapter on gemstones, Pliny records a ritualized use of the biga, saying those who seek the draconitis or draconitias, "snake stone", ride in a biga.

== Bigatus ==
The bigatus was a silver coin so called because it depicted a biga. Luna in her two-horse chariot was depicted on the first issue of the bigatus. Victory in her biga was later featured.

== See also ==
- Roman roads
