= Parabiago Plate =

Ancient Roman silver plate

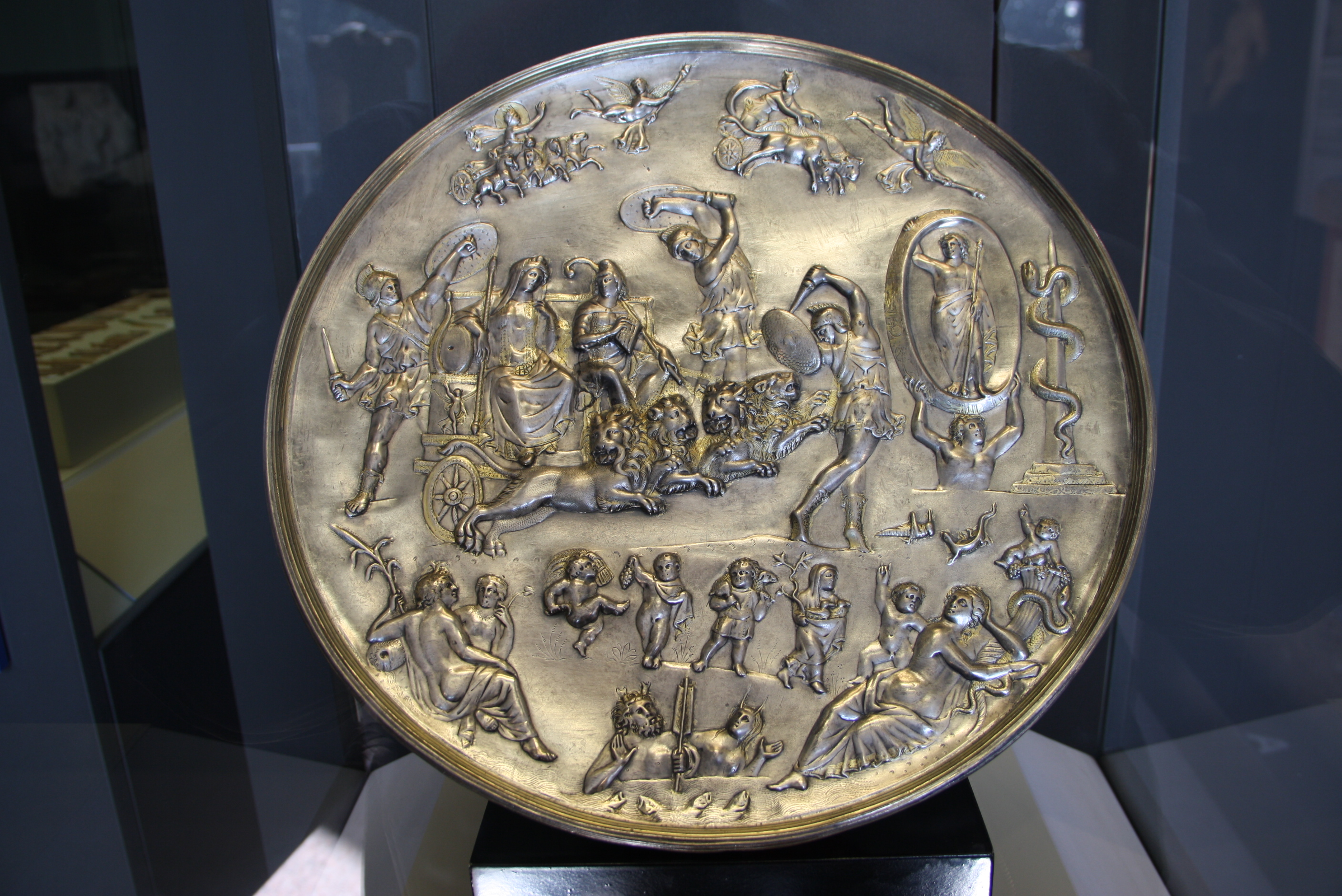
Parabiago plate, Archaeological Museum of Milan.

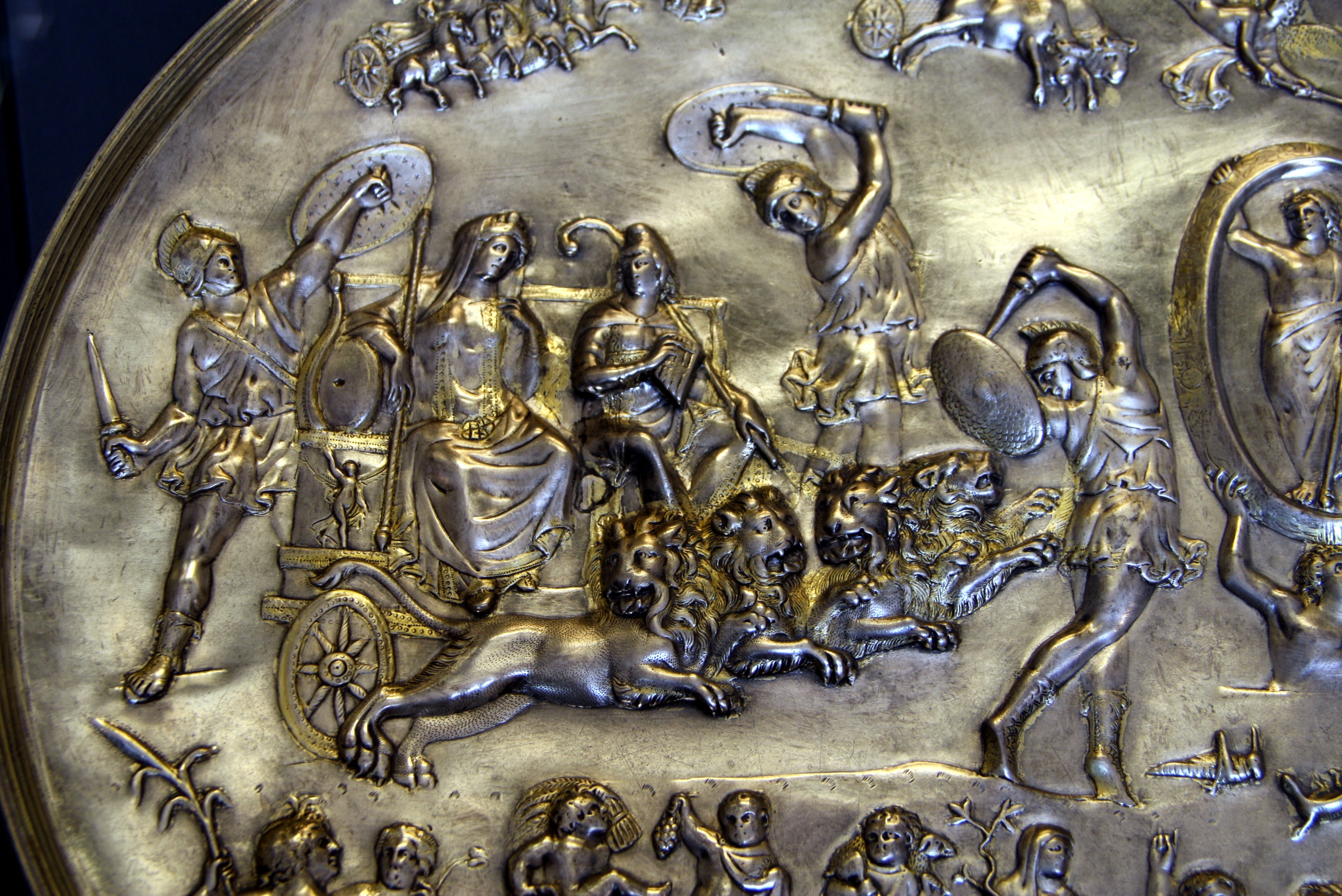
Detail: Cybele and Attis group.

The Parabiago plate, also known as the Parabiago patera, (Note: However, it is a ‘plate’, not a patera.) is an ancient Roman circular silver plate depicting mythological figures. It was found in an ancient Roman cemetery at Parabiago, near Milan, in 1907, and is now in the Archaeological Museum of Milan. The plate depicts Cybele with her consort Attis in a "vast cosmic setting" amid "sun, moon, earth and sea, time and the seasons." At the time of its discovery, it was thought to have been used as a lid for a funerary amphora.

The plate is difficult to date. Earlier scholars tended to date it to the 2nd century CE, because of its classicizing style, but stylistic characteristics also permit a later date. Technical analyses, however, support a provenance in the 4th–5th centuries, even though it bears little stylistic resemblance to other silver pieces from that period.

== Description ==
The plate weighs 3555 g and measures 390 mm in diameter. It has a foot-ring of 26 mm in height. The surface is worked with figures in high relief.

- Center left: Cybele and Attis ride in a quadriga pulled by four lions. They are accompanied by three Corybantes.
- Center right: Rising from the ground is a nude youth who holds up a zodiac ring surrounding Aion, wearing a chiton and holding a sceptre.
- Far right center: A snake twines around an obelisk or gnomon.
- Upper left: The Sun rising in his chariot, preceded by the winged, torch-bearing morning star, Phosphorus.
- Upper right: The Moon setting in her chariot (biga), preceded by the evening star, Hesperus, also winged and carrying a torch.
- Lower center: Four erotes representing the seasons hover above Oceanus and Tethys.
- Lower left: Two river nymphs.
- Lower right: Tellus, with two erotes who point toward Cybele. Above the head of Tellus is a small grasshopper and a lizard.
