= Patera =

Ritual bowl for libation

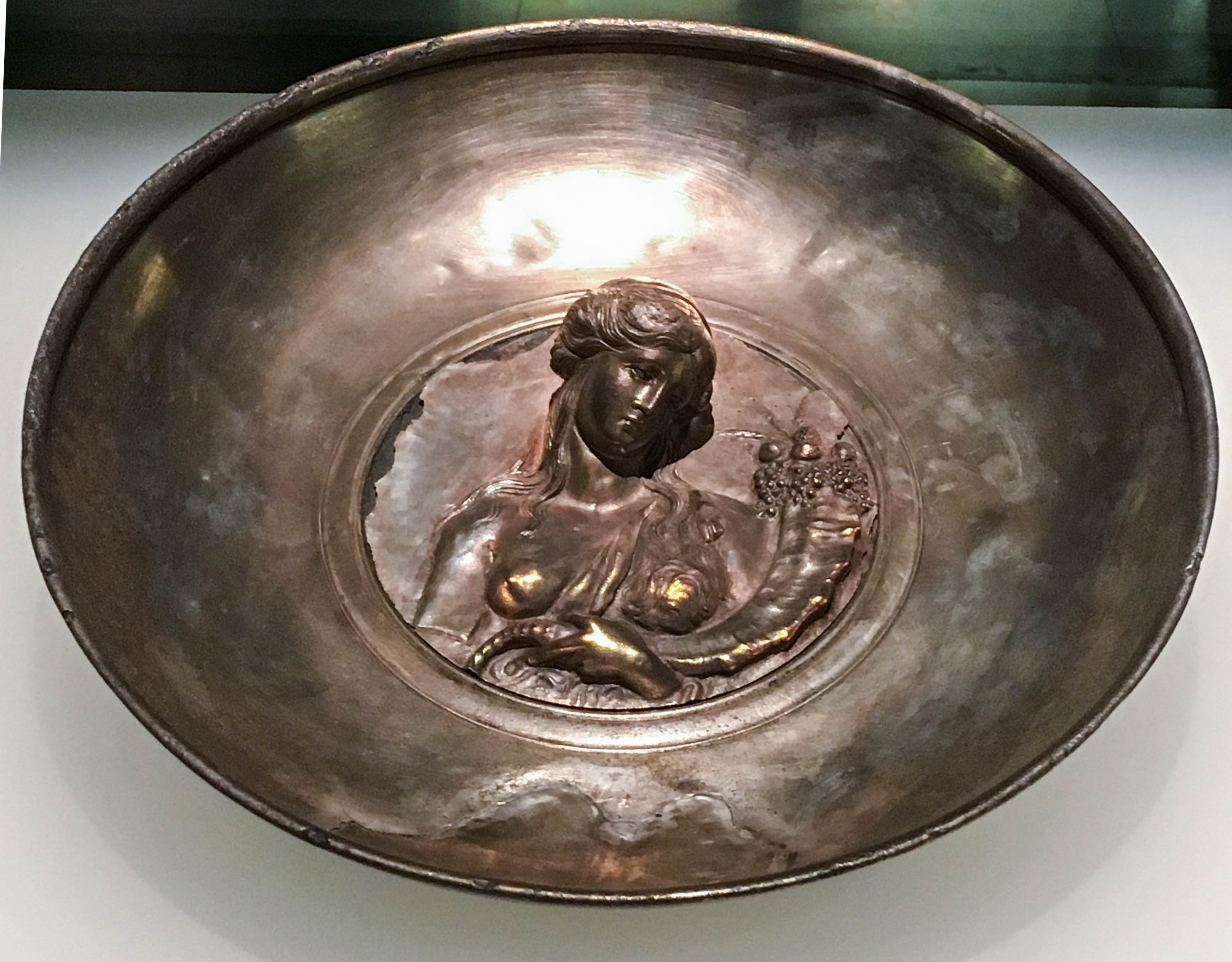
Patera from Georgia, likely depicting Fortuna (2nd century AD, Georgian National Museum)

In the material culture of classical antiquity, a patera (Latin pronunciation: [ˈpatɛra]) or phiale (Ancient Greek: φιάλη [pʰi.á.lɛː]) is a shallow ceramic or metal libation bowl. It often has a bulbous indentation (omphalos, "belly button") in the center underside to facilitate holding it, in which case it is sometimes called a mesomphalic phiale. It typically has no handles, and no feet.

Although the two terms may be used interchangeably, particularly in the context of Etruscan culture, phiale is more common in reference to Greek forms, and patera in Roman settings. The form should be distinguished from a drinking cup with handles, and often a stem, of which the most common type is called a kylix, and a circular platter with a pair of C-handles is not a patera, though a few paterae have single long straight handles (see trulla below).

== Use ==
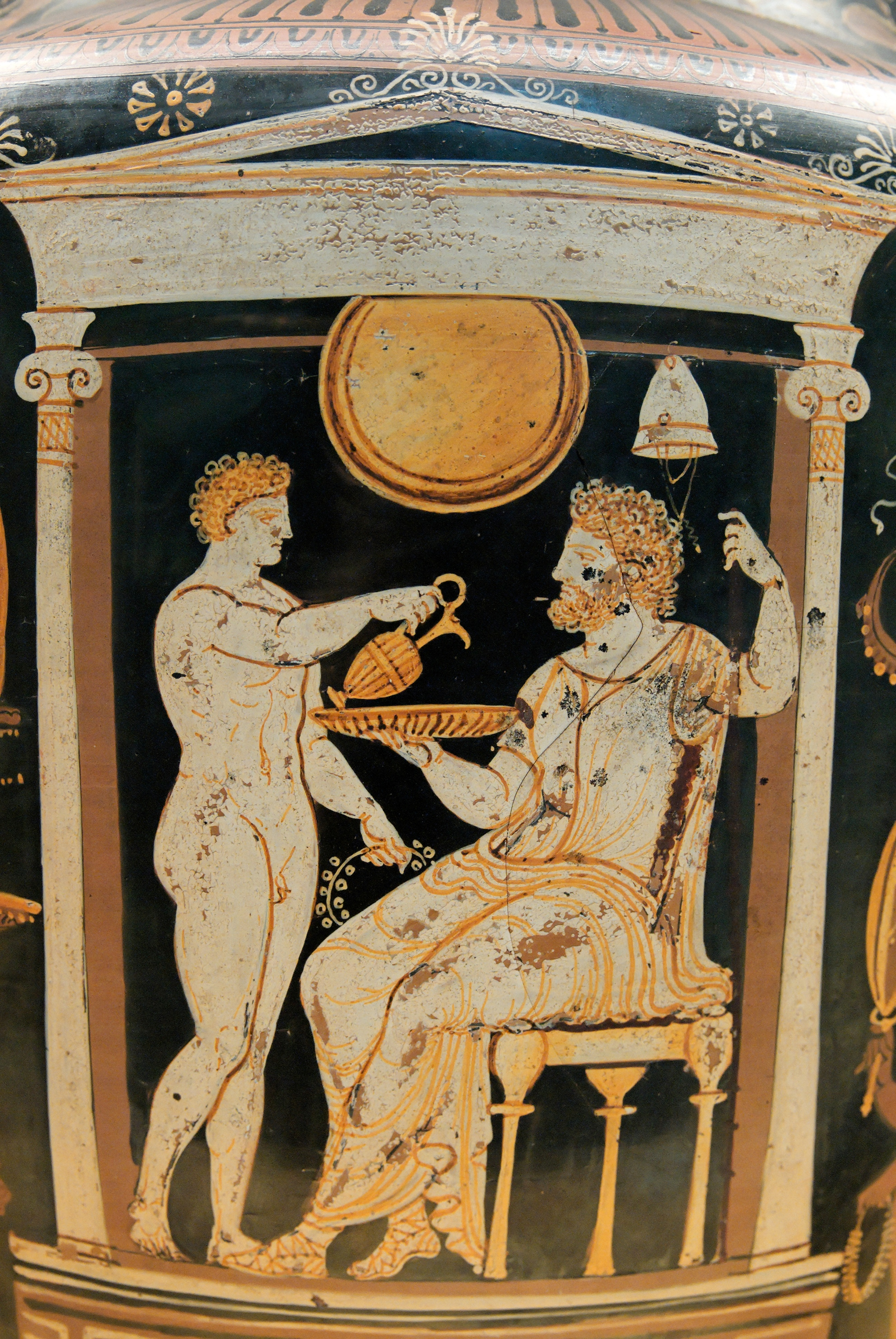
A youth pours a libation to the deceased within a naiskos, a scene that may also represent Ganymede serving Zeus (Apulian red-figure krater, 340–320 BC)

Libation was a central and vital aspect of ancient Greek religion, and one of the simplest and most common forms of religious practice. It is one of the basic religious acts that define piety in ancient Greece, dating back to the Bronze Age and even prehistoric Greece. Libations were a part of daily life, and the pious might perform them every day in the morning and evening, as well as to begin meals. A libation most often consisted of mixed wine and water, but could also be unmixed wine, honey, oil, water, or milk.

The form of libation called spondē is typically the ritualized pouring of wine from a jug or bowl held in the hand. The most common ritual was to pour the liquid from an oinochoē (wine jug) into a phiale. Libation generally accompanied prayer. The Greeks stood when they prayed, either with their arms uplifted, or in the act of libation with the right arm extended to hold the phiale. After the wine offering was poured from the phiale, the remainder of the contents was drunk by the celebrant.

In Roman art, the libation is shown performed at an altar, mensa (sacrificial meal table), or tripod. It was the simplest form of sacrifice, and could be a sufficient offering by itself. The introductory rite (praefatio) to an animal sacrifice included an incense and wine libation onto a burning altar. Both emperors and divinities are frequently depicted, especially on coins, pouring libations from a patera. Scenes of libation and the patera itself commonly signify the quality of pietas, religious duty or reverence.

== Handled pans ==
In Roman contexts patera is sometimes used for what is normally called a trulla. These are deep round pans with a single flat handle, for cooking and serving food. The Staffordshire Moorlands Pan is an example, although it has lost its handle.

== Gallery ==
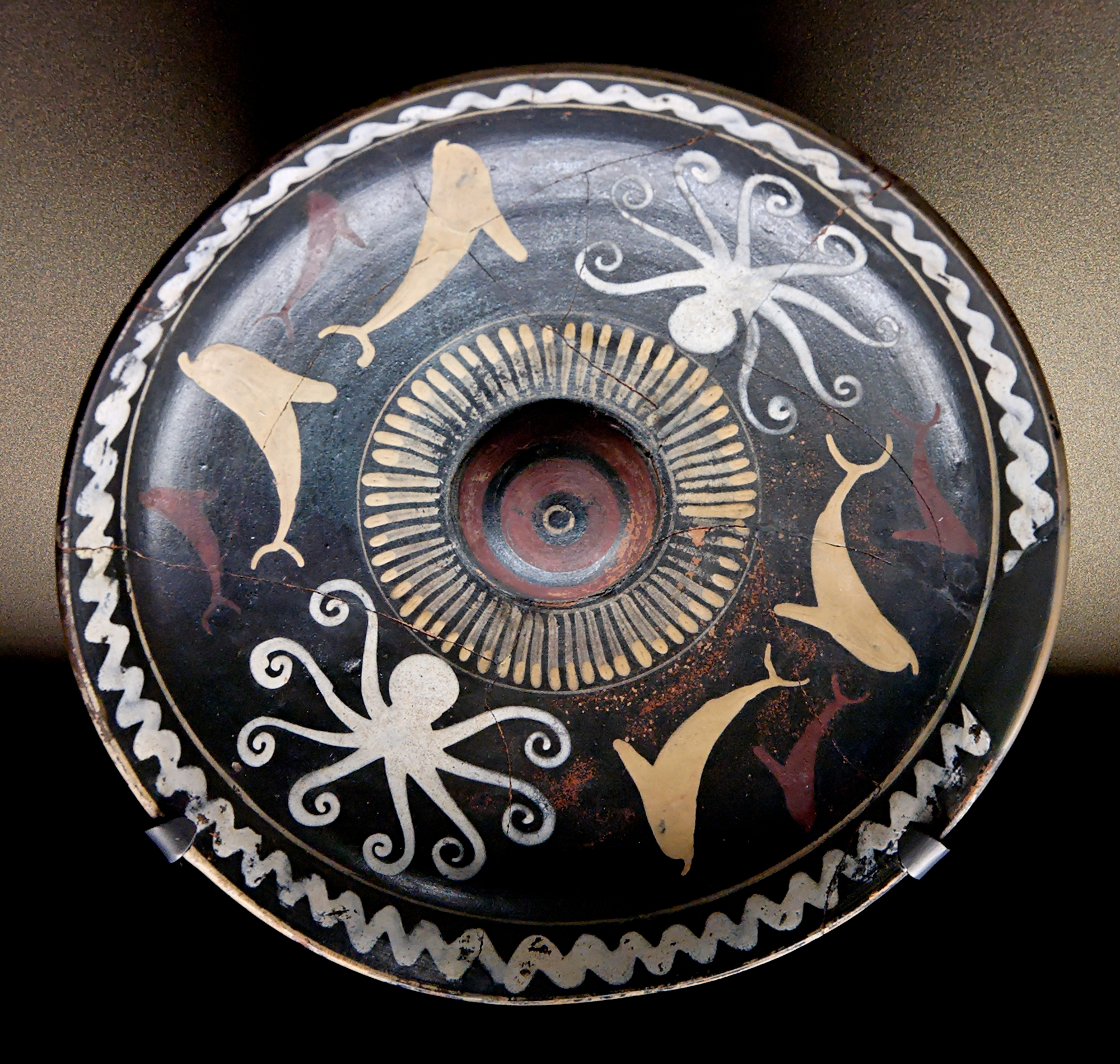
Octopus and dolphin motifs on a ceramic phiale (510–500 BC, from Eretria, Euboea)

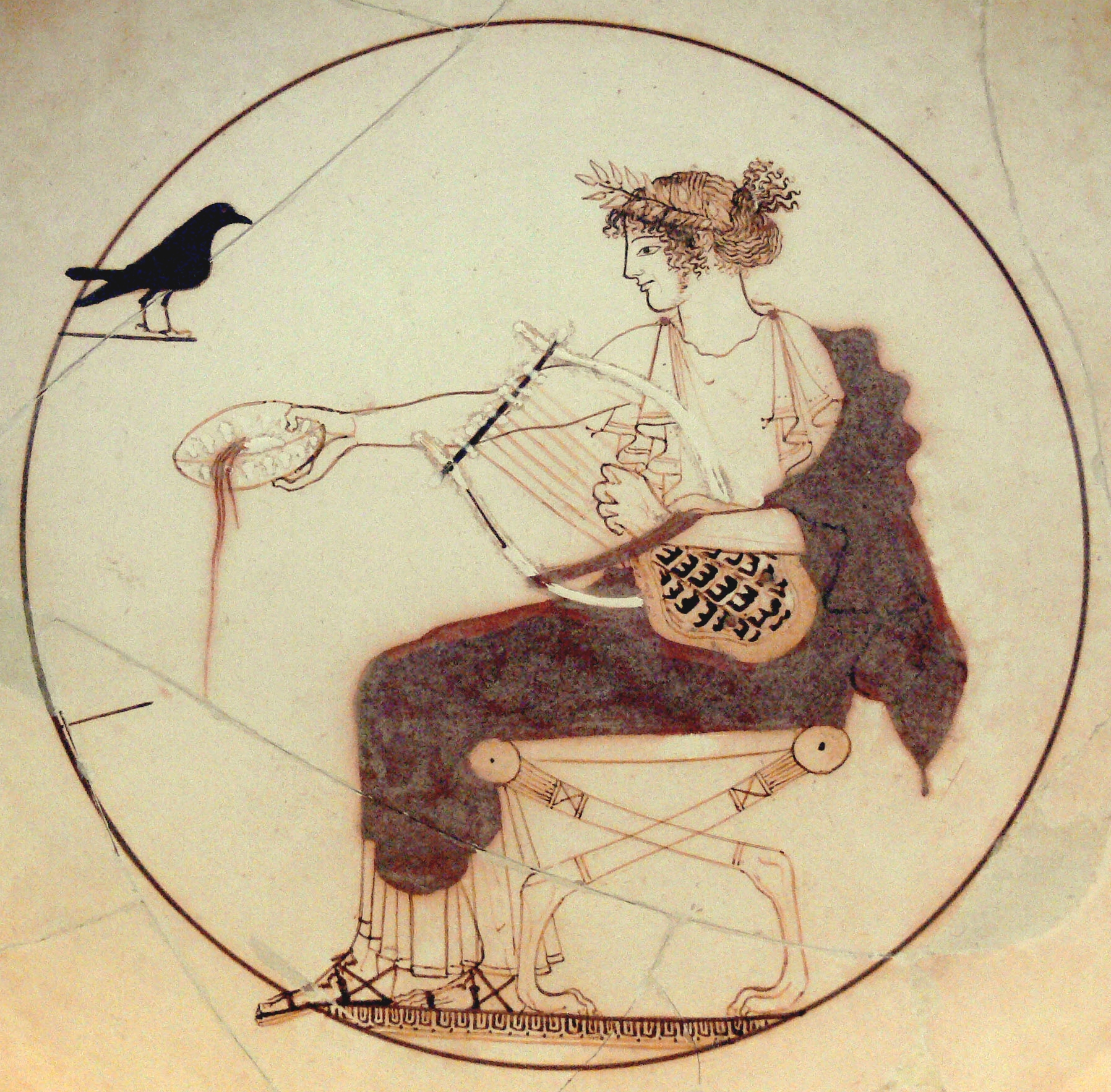
Cylix of Apollo, who pours a libation (Attic white-ground kylix, c. 460 BC)

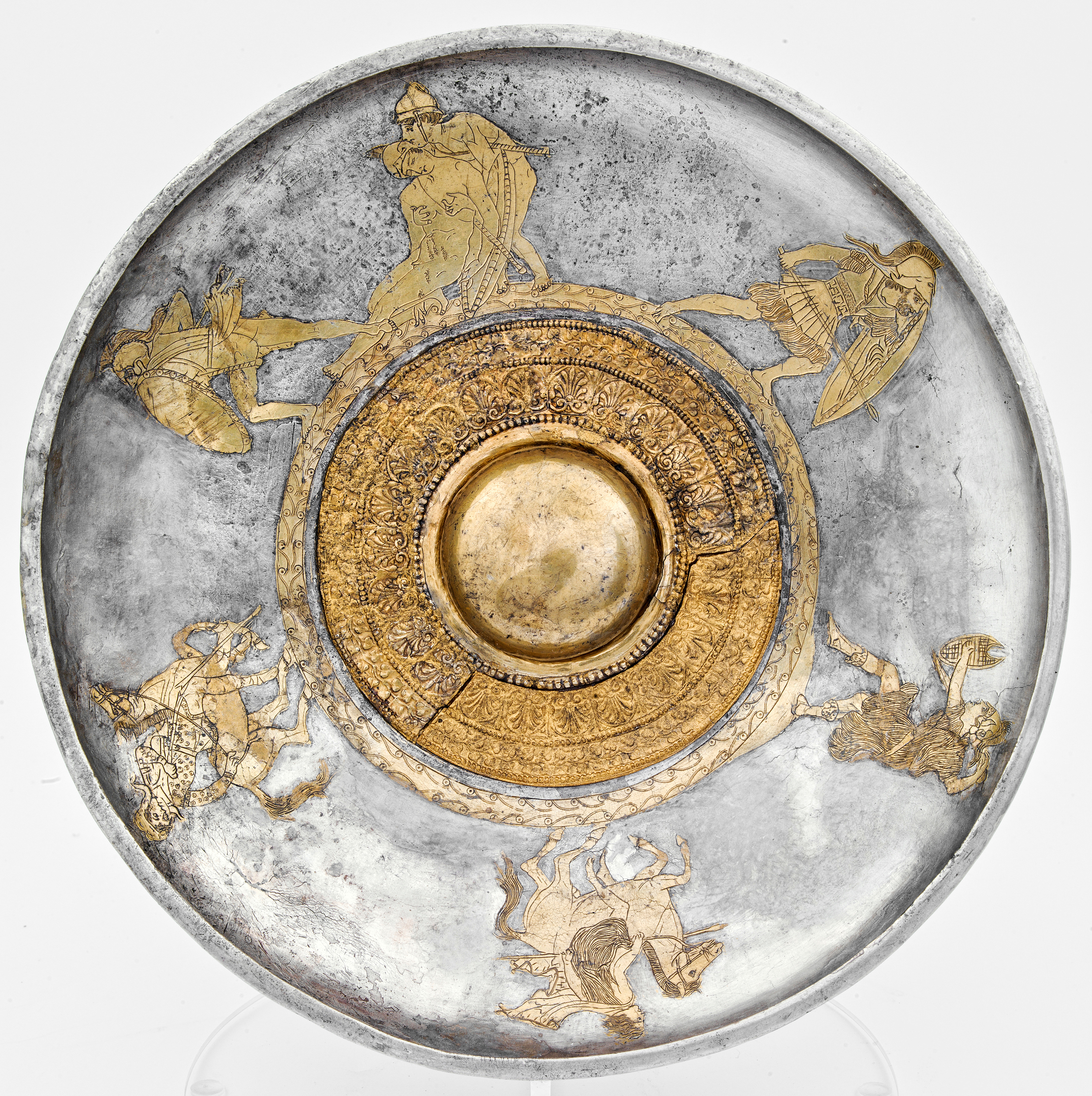
Silver phiale with Amazonomachy (430-420 BC, Vassil Bojkov collection, Sofia, Bulgaria)

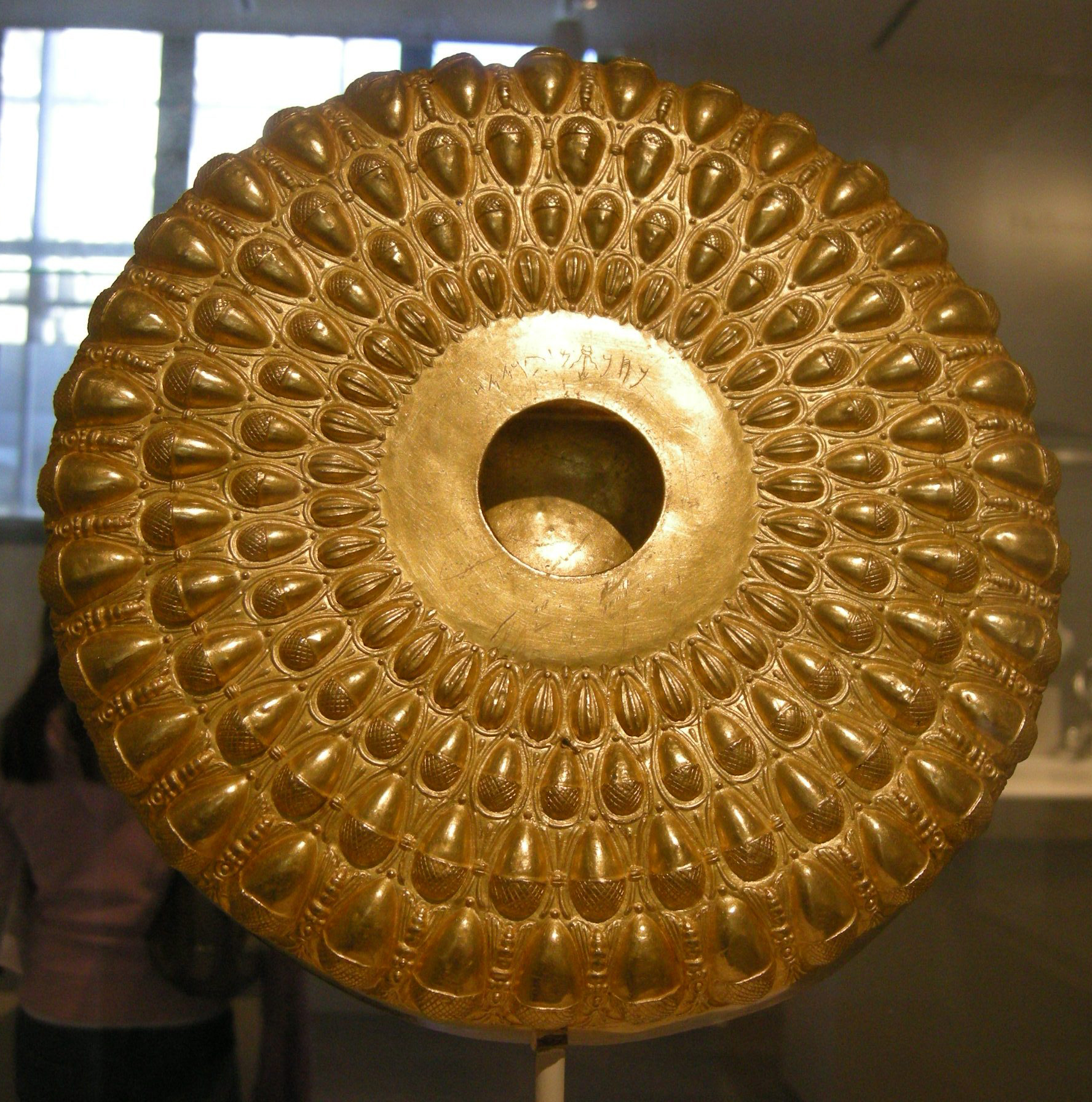
Gold phiale with repoussé bees, acorns, and beechnuts and Greek and Punic inscription (4th–3rd century BC, Met)

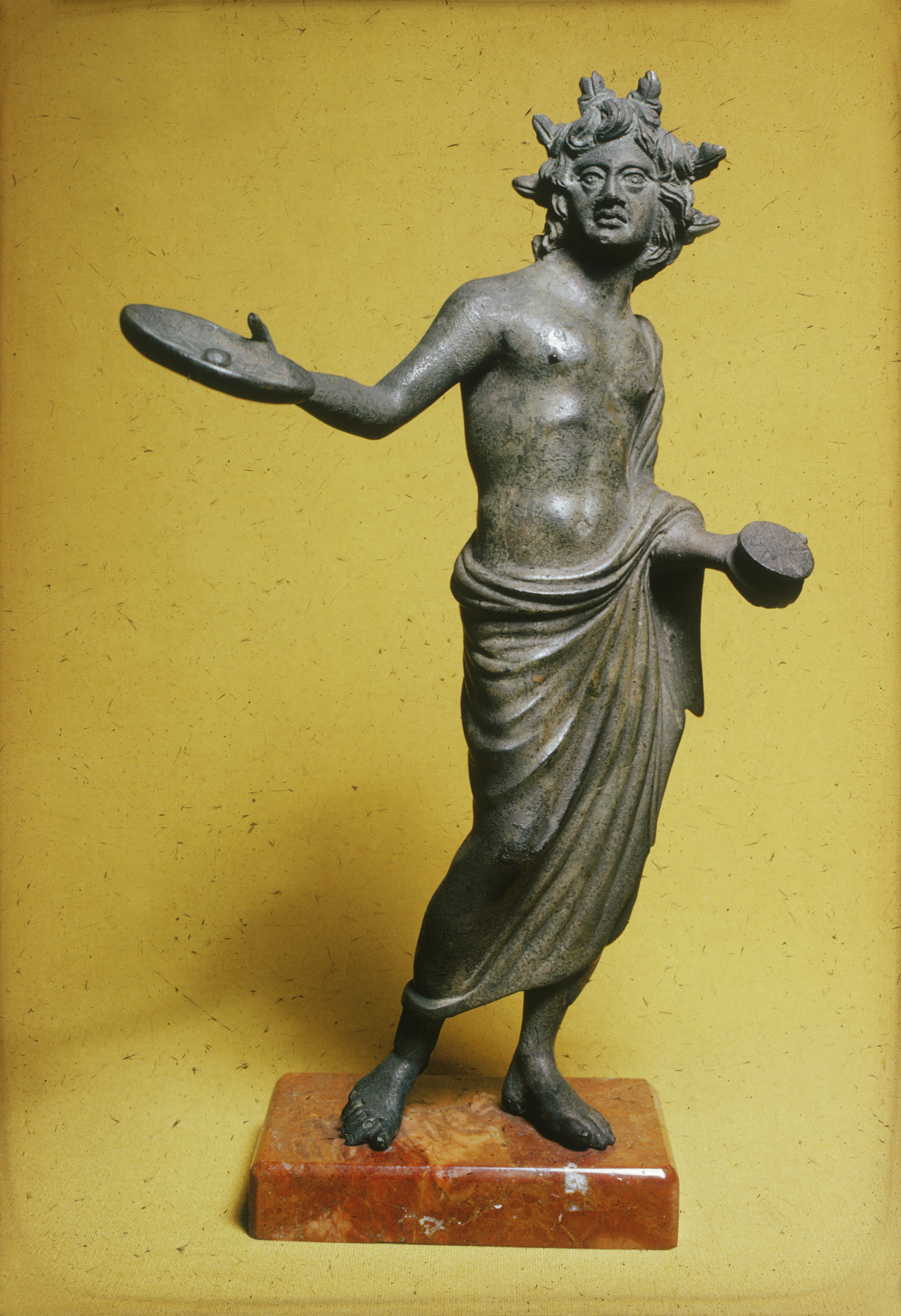
Etruscan priest with phiale (2nd century BC)

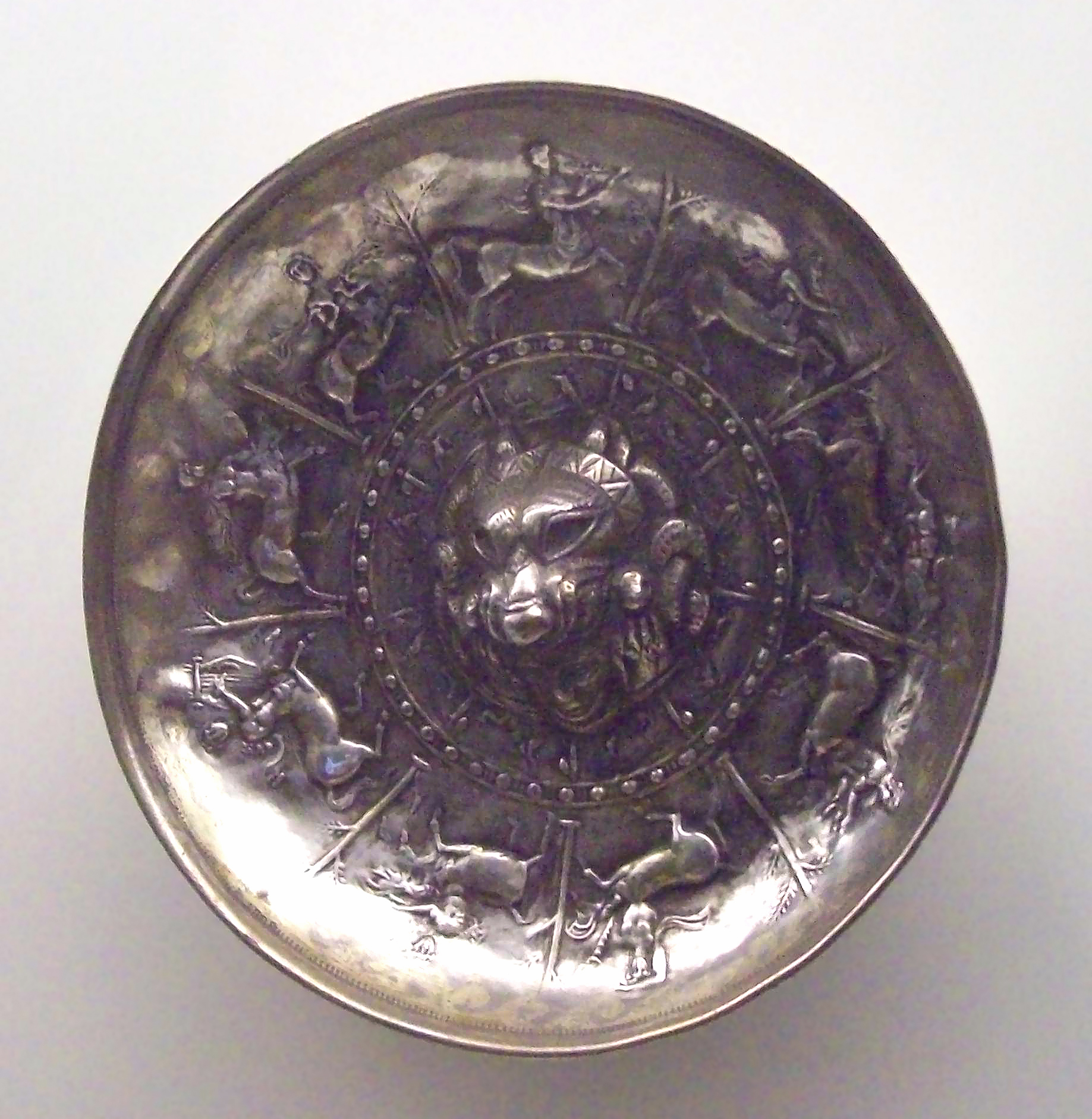
Silver patera from Hispania (Roman Spain), 2nd–1st century BC)

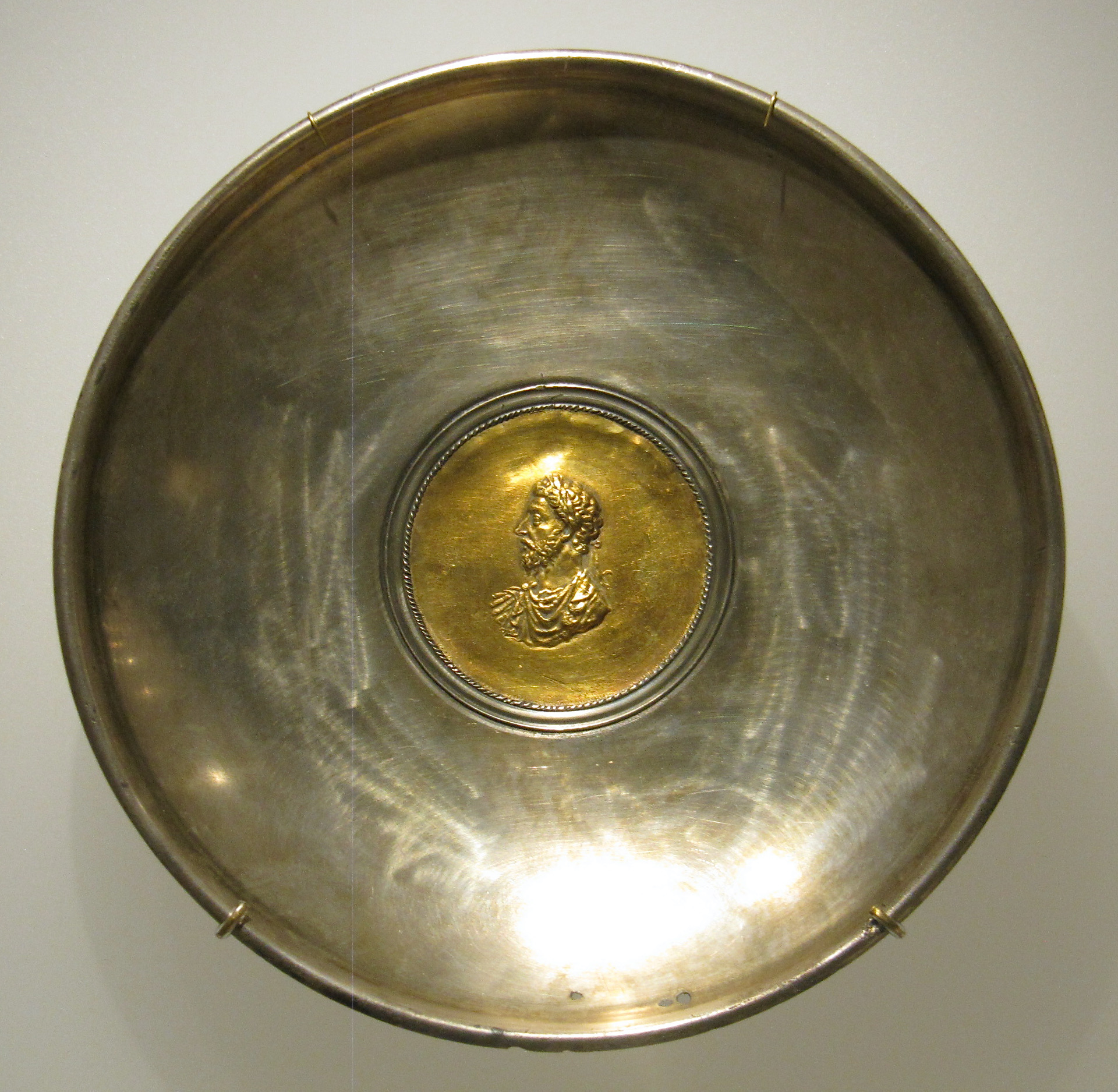
Patera with Marcus Aurelius (Georgia, 2nd century AD)

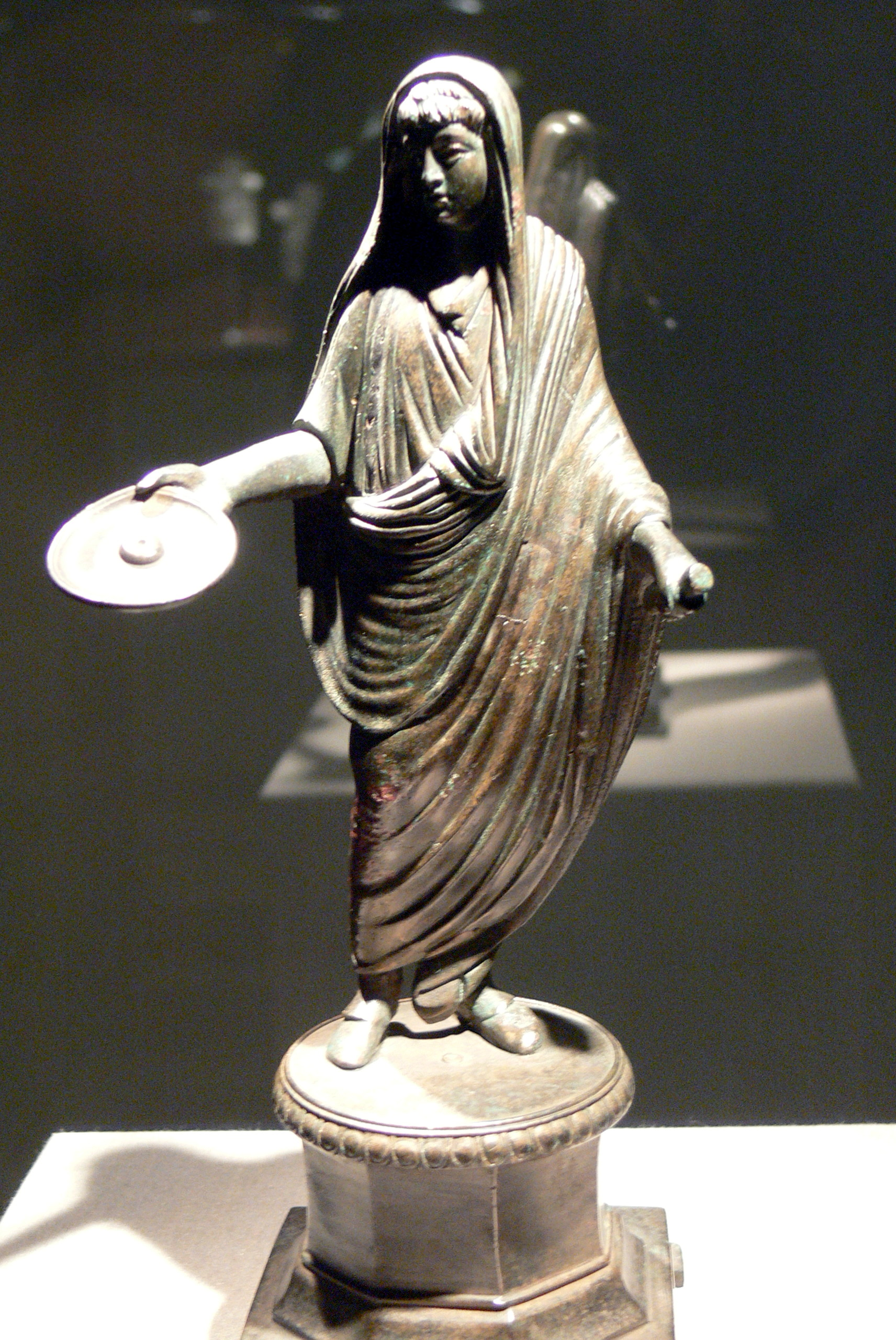
Roman priest, capite velato (2nd–3rd century AD)

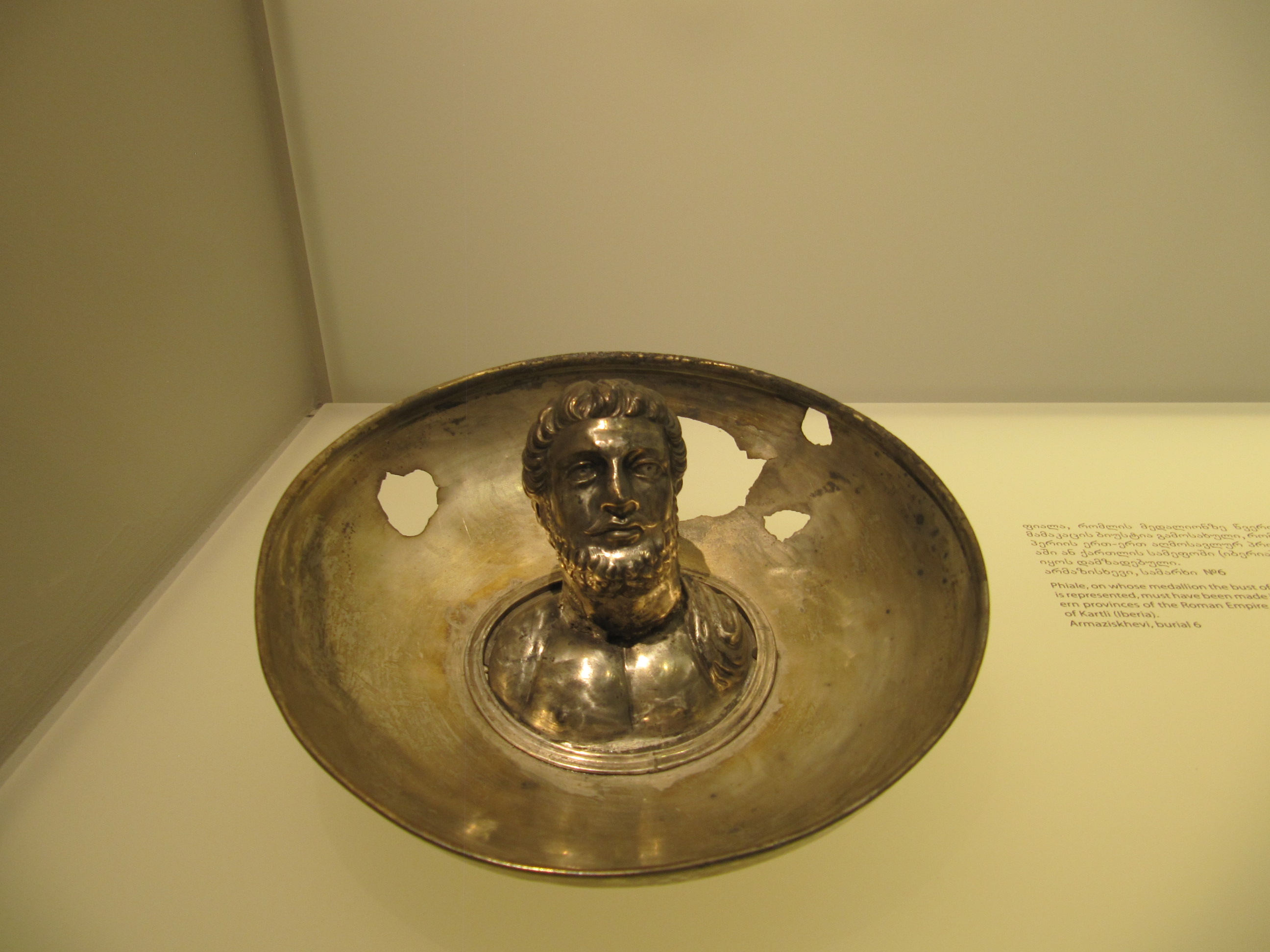
Phiale from eastern Georgia, featuring a bust of a bearded male, no later than 350 AD.

== Architecture ==
In architecture, oval features on plaster friezes on buildings may be called paterae (plural).

== See also ==
- Parabiago patera, which is actually a platter or plate
- Piyāla - small ceramic easily stackable bowl used by Eurasian nomads people for drinking and libations
