= Aeternitas =

Personification of eternity in Roman religion

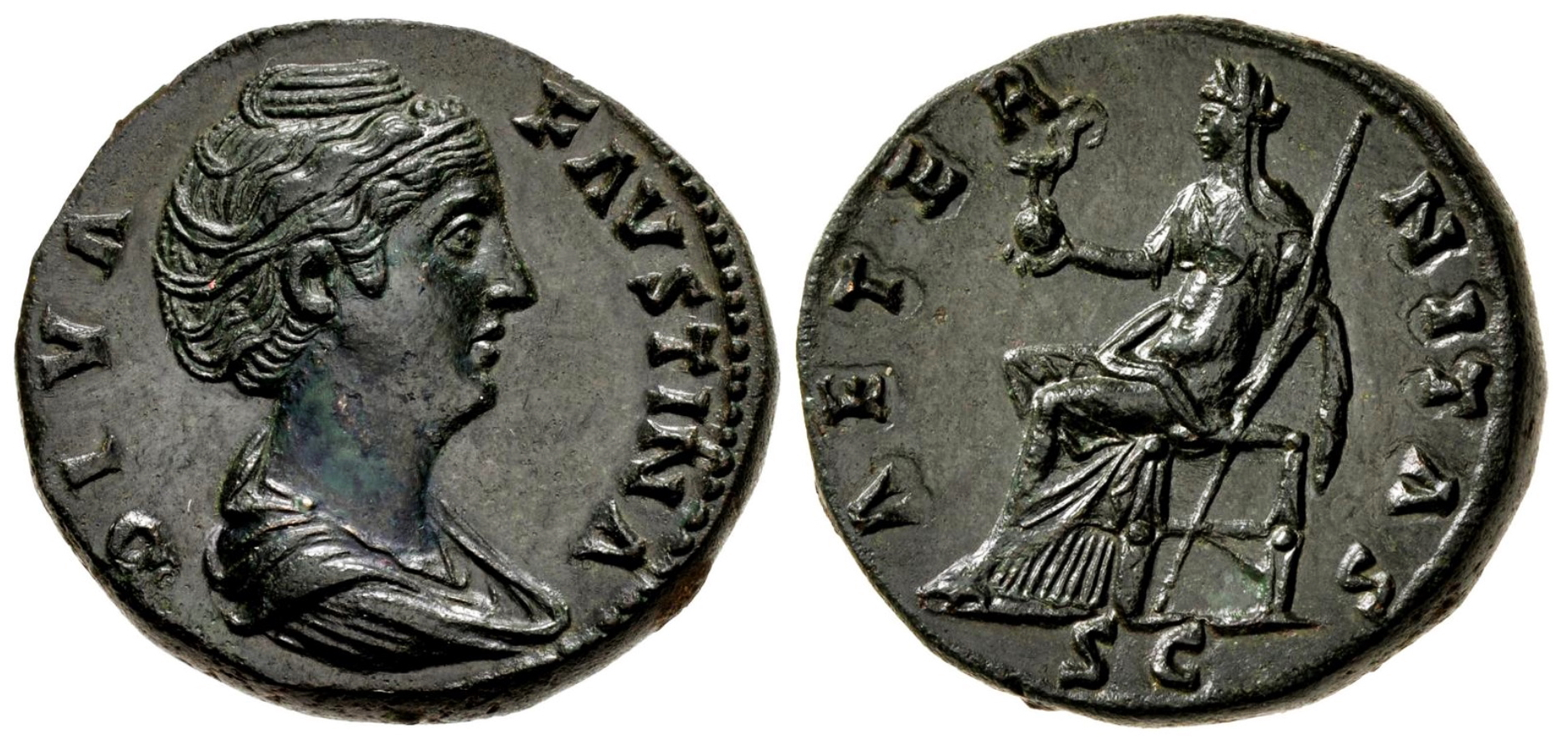
Sestertius of Faustina Major showing Aeternitas seated holding phoenix on globe and scepter

In ancient Roman religion, Aeternitas was the divine personification of eternity. She was particularly associated with Imperial cult as a virtue of the deified emperor (divus). The religious maintenance of abstract deities such as Aeternitas was characteristic of official Roman cult from the time of the Julio-Claudians to the Severans.

Like the more familiar anthropomorphic deities, Aeternitas and other abstractions were cultivated with sacrifices and temples, both in Rome and in the provinces. The temple of Aeternitas Augusta at Tarraco in Roman Spain was pictured on a coin.

The divinity sometimes appears as Aeternitas Imperii (the "Eternity of Roman rule"), where the Latin word imperium ("command, power") points toward the meaning "empire," the English word derived from it. Aeternitas Imperii was among the deities who received sacrifices from the Arval Brethren in a thanksgiving when Nero survived conspiracy and attempted assassination. New bronze coinage was issued at this time, on which various virtues were represented. Aeternitas was among the many virtues depicted on coinage issued under Vespasian, Titus, Trajan, Hadrian, Antoninus Pius, and Septimius Severus.

The coins issued 75–79 AD under Vespasian show Aeternitas holding a head in each hand representing Sol and Luna. On the coins of Titus (80–81 AD), Aeternitas holds a cornucopia, leans on a scepter, and has one foot placed on a globe, imagery that links the concepts of eternity, prosperity, and world dominion. From the 2nd to the mid-3rd century, the iconography of Aeternitas includes the globe, celestial bodies (stars, or sun and moon), and the phoenix, a symbol of cyclical time, since the phoenix was reborn every 500 years. Aeternitas sometimes holds the globe on which the phoenix perches.

In The Marriage of Philology and Mercury, Martianus Capella says that Aeternitas is among the more honored of Jupiter's daughters. He mentions her diadem, the circular shape of which represents eternity.

The male equivalent of Aeternitas is Aion, the god of unbound time, the celestial spheres, and the Zodiac.

== See also ==
- 446 Aeternitas
