= Aion (deity) =

Deity in Hellenistic mythology

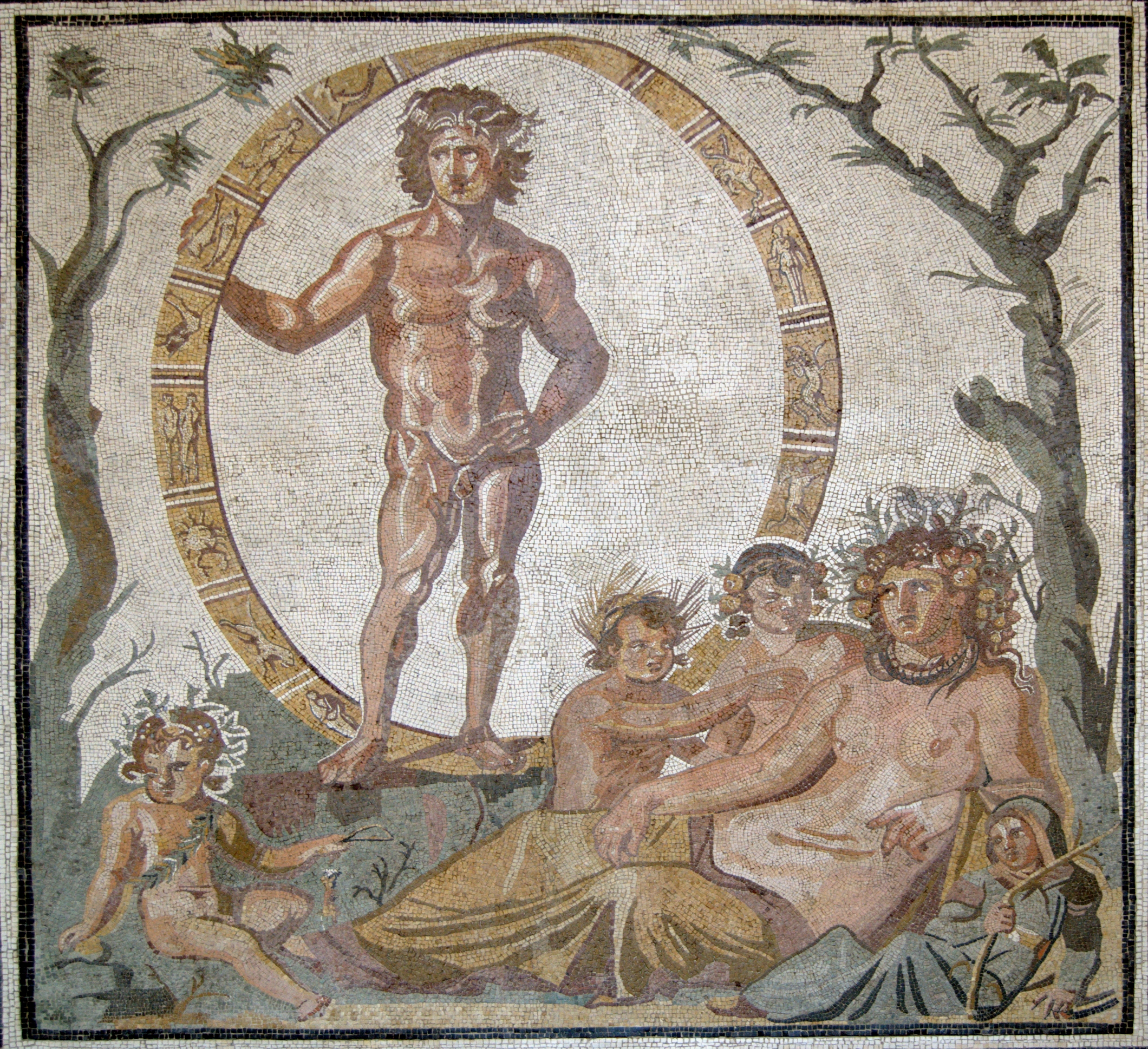
Aion depicted as a young man with wings attached to his temples, standing in the circle of the zodiac, with Terra and four putti (representing the seasons) nearby, Roman mosaic, Sentinum, c. 200–300 AD

Aion (from Hellenistic Greek: αἰών, romanized: aión, lit. 'long period of time', [ai̯ˈɔːn]) is a Hellenistic deity associated with time, the orb or circle encompassing the universe, and the zodiac. The "time" which Aion represents is perpetual, unbounded, ritual, and cyclic: The future is a returning version of the past, later called aevum (see Vedic Sanskrit Ṛtú). Philosophically and mythologically, especially in the context of the mysteries, Aion is understood as the ontological personification of eternity : the time of indestructible permanence, which is in essence the duration of the fact of Existence, understood as eternal and immutable.

This kind of time contrasts with empirical, linear, progressive, and historical time that Chronos represented, which divides into past, present, and future.

Aion is thus a god of the cyclic ages, and the cycle of the year and the zodiac. In the latter part of the Classical era he became associated with mystery religions concerned with the afterlife, such as the mysteries of Cybele, the Dionysian mysteries, Orphic religion, and the Mithraic mysteries. In Latin, the concept of the deity may appear as Aeternitas, Anna Perenna, or Saeculum. He is typically in the company of an earth or mother goddess such as Tellus or Cybele, as on the Parabiago plate.

== Iconography and symbolism ==
Aion is usually identified as the nude or mostly nude young man within a circle representing the zodiac, symbolic of eternal and cyclical time. Examples include two Roman mosaics from Sentinum (modern–day Sassoferrato) and Hippo Regius in Roman Africa, and the Parabiago plate. But because he represents time as a cycle, he may also be presented as an old man. In the Dionysiaca, Nonnus associates Aion with the Horae and says that he:

changes the burden of old age like a snake who sloughs off the coils of the useless old scales, rejuvenescing while washing in the swells of the laws [of time]. (Note: Nonnus. Dionysiaca. 41.180 ff. cited by Levi (1944))

The imagery of the twining serpent is connected to the hoop or wheel through the ouroboros, a ring formed by a snake holding the tip of its tail in its mouth. The 4th century CE Latin commentator Servius notes that the image of a snake biting its tail represents the cyclical nature of the year. (Note: Maurus Servius Honoratus. Note to the Aeneid. 5.85. "according to the Egyptians, before the invention of the alphabet, the year was symbolized by a picture of a serpent biting its own tail, because it recurs on itself" (annus secundum Aegyptios indicabatur ante inventas litteras picto dracone caudam suam mordente, quia in se recurrit)" cited byShanzer (1986))

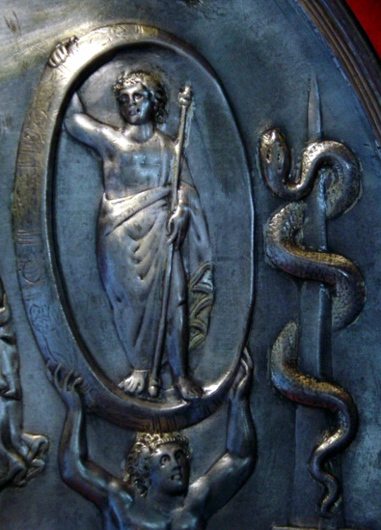
Detail from the Parabiago plate depicting Aion; Ajax is shown holding up the zodiac from below, and Tellus (not shown) appears on the plate outside of this image, just past the bottom left of the picture, reclining among her children by Aion.

In his 5th century work on hieroglyphics, Horapollo makes a further distinction between a serpent that hides its tail under the rest of its body, which represents Aion, and the ouroboros that represents the kosmos, which is the serpent devouring its tail. (Note: Horapollo (1940). Hieroglyphica. Sbordone. 1.1 & 1.2. cited by Shanzer (1986))

== Identifications ==
Martianus Capella (5th century CE) identified Aion with Cronus (Latin Saturnus), whose name caused him to be theologically conflated with Chronos ("Time"), in the way that the Greek ruler of the underworld Plouton (Pluto) was conflated with Ploutos (Plutus, "Wealth"). Martianus presents Cronus-Aion as the consort of Rhea (Latin Ops) as identified with Physis.

In his highly speculative reconstruction of Mithraic cosmogony, Franz Cumont positioned Aion as Unlimited Time (sometimes represented as Saeculum, Cronus, or Saturn) as the god who emerged from primordial Chaos, and who in turn generated Heaven and Earth. Modern scholars call this deity the 'leonto‑cephaline' figure – a winged, lion-headed, nude male, whose torso is entwined by a serpent. He typically holds a sceptre, keys, and / or a thunderbolt. Nobody knows for sure who he was or what he represented, but aside from the lion-head, depictions of him have Aion's icons; in rare instances, his statue appears in mithrea with the human head, and with the lion-head gone, he is indistinguishable from Aion.

The figure of Time "played a considerable, though to us completely obscure, role" in Mithraic ritual and theology.

Aion is identified with Dionysus by Christian and Neoplatonic writers, but there are no references to Dionysus as Aion before the Christian era. Euripides, however, does call Aion a 'son of Zeus'.

The Suda identifies Aion with Osiris and Adonis (probably because originally Adonis had been a god who was later downgraded to the status of "mortal" since he was believed to have died). In Ptolemaic Alexandria, at the site of a dream oracle, the Hellenistic syncretic god Serapis was identified as Aion Plutonius. (Note: Pseudo-Callisthenes. Alexander romance. I.30–33. cited by Fossum (1999).) The epithet Plutonius marks functional aspects shared with Pluto, consort of Persephone and ruler of the underworld in the Eleusinian tradition. Epiphanius says that at Alexandria Aion's birth from Kore the Virgin was celebrated 6 January: "On this day and at this hour the Virgin gave birth to Aion." The date, which coincides with Epiphany, brought new year's celebrations to a close, completing the cycle of time that Aion embodies.

The Alexandrian Aion may be a form of Osiris-Dionysus, reborn annually; his image was marked with crosses on his hands, knees, and forehead. Quispel (2008) conjectured that the figure resulted from integrating the Orphic Phanes, who like Aion is associated with a coiling serpent, into Mithraic religion at Alexandria, and that he "assures the eternity of the city."

In the art of the Roman era, Aion was often conflated with the primordial sky god Uranus / Caelus.

== Roman Empire ==
This syncretic Aion became a symbol and guarantor of the perpetuity of Roman rule, and emperors such as Antoninus Pius issued coins with the legend Aion, whose (female) Roman counterpart was Aeternitas. Roman coins associate both Aion and Aeternitas with the phoenix as a symbol of rebirth and cyclical renewal.

Aion was among the virtues and divine personifications that were part of late Hellenic discourse, in which they figure as "creative agents in grand cosmological schemes". The significance of Aion lies in his malleability: He is a "fluid conception" through which various ideas about time and divinity converge in the Hellenistic era, in the context of syncretic and monotheistic tendencies.
