= Barrel bomb =

Explosive device

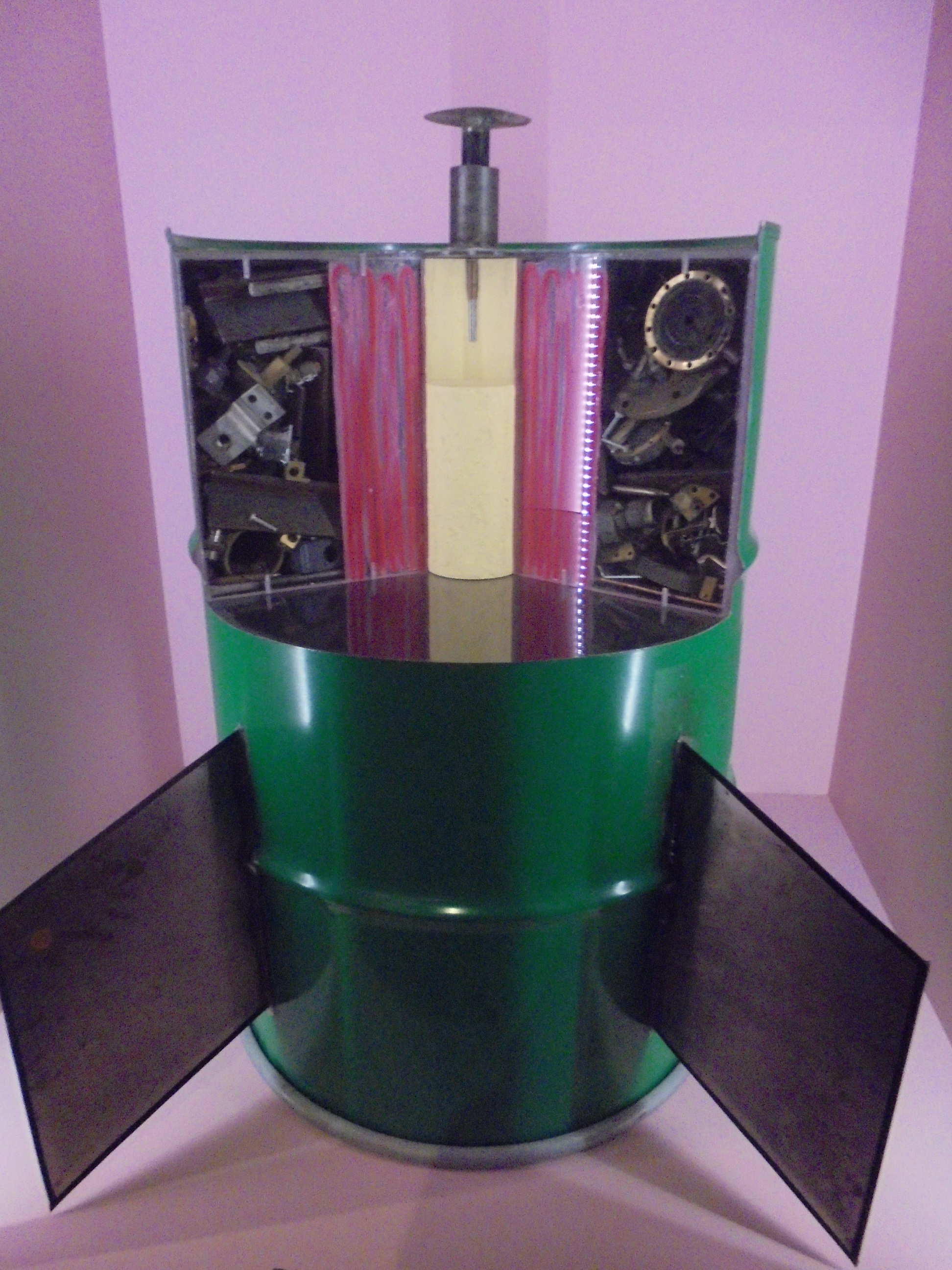
A replica of a barrel bomb in the Imperial War Museum in London

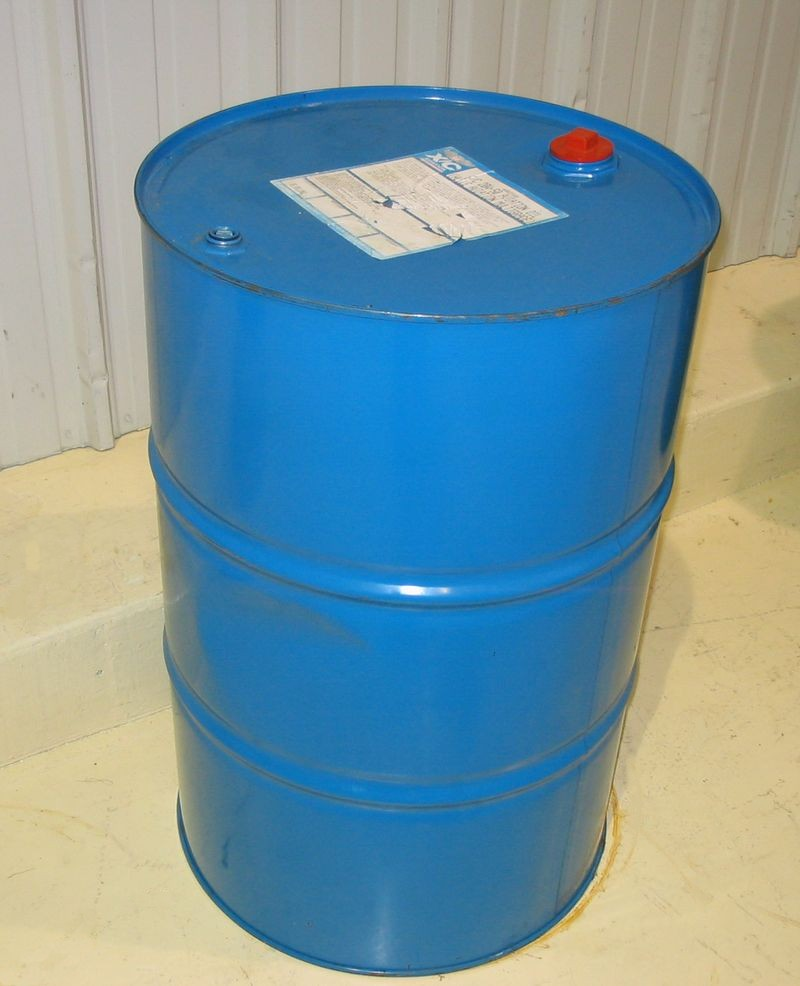
205-litre (55 US or 44 imp gal) drum

A barrel bomb is an improvised unguided bomb, sometimes described as a flying IED (improvised explosive device). They are typically made from a large barrel-shaped metal container that has been filled with explosives, possibly shrapnel, oil or chemicals as well, and then dropped from a helicopter or aeroplane. Due to the large amount of explosives (up to 1,000 kilograms (2,200 lb)), their poor accuracy, and indiscriminate use in populated civilian areas (including refugee camps), the resulting impacts have been devastating. Critics have characterised them as weapons of terror and illegal under international conventions.

Barrel bombs were used in different conflict zones including in 1948 and by the US military in Vietnam in the late 1960s. Starting in the 1990s, they were also used in Sri Lanka, Croatia and Sudan. Barrel bombs were used extensively by the Syrian Air Force during the Syrian civil war—bringing the weapon to widespread global attention—and later by Iraqi forces during the Anbar campaign. Experts believe they will continue to be embraced by unstable nations fighting insurgencies since they are cheap to make and utilise the advantages of a government's airpower.

== Description ==
Barrel bombs are cheap to produce, potentially costing as little as $200 to $300. They can be used with any type of aircraft including non-military cargo planes. The explosive payload can be as simple as fertilizer and diesel. The bomb may contain metal shrapnel such as nuts and bolts or chemicals such as chlorine. The bomb is shaped like a barrel or pipe and might be made from improvised material or specially designed. The early versions in Syria used lit fuses and thus had to be carefully timed, otherwise they would fail to explode before breaking apart on the ground or explode too soon in the air. Later models had impact fuses and stabilizing fins which were improved on over time. Earlier barrel bombs also weighed less (100–300 pounds/45–150 kg), while later versions range from 1,000 pounds (454 kg) to 1 ton(ne).

== History of barrel bombs by country ==
A chronological history of barrel bomb usage by country.

=== Palestine and Israel ===
The first barrel bomb was used on September 29, 1947, and can be traced to a design by Amichai Paglin, the Irgun's chief operations officer and bomb designer. As background, in August the SS Exodus, loaded with Holocaust refugees, was being detained at the port of Haifa by British authorities. When the refugees were barred from entering Palestine and the ship forced back to Germany later that month, Irgun looked for a suitable way to retaliate against the British. The northern police HQ in Haifa came to their attention, but it was surrounded by sand-filled barrels and a mesh fence of barbed-wire. Paglin set to work designing a bomb that could penetrate the fence and blow up the building. He hit on the idea of using an oil barrel. Haifa was one of the great oil ports in the 1940s and standard 55-gallon steel oil drums came into common usage only a few years earlier during WWII; they were first developed by Germany and Italy but were quickly adopted by the Allies and widely available.

Paglin's bomb design consisted of an oil barrel with tires mounted on the ends allowing it to roll. It was filled with 500 pounds of explosives. The bomb was hoisted onto the top of a lorry under a canvas tarp to keep it hidden. The height of the lorry was higher than the top of the fence surrounding the police station. A cord inside the lorry released the barrel which sent it down a short ramp, also mounted on the lorry roof, launching it over the fence onto the police grounds. Momentum carried the barrel bomb towards the police building. The bomb had an automatic "lock" that stopped the wheels spinning when it hit an obstacle such as the building, so that it would not roll backwards. There up against the wall, a pre-lit fuse ran out and the bomb exploded. In the attack 10 people were killed and 54 injured, of which 33 were British. Four British policemen, four Arab policemen, an Arab women and a 16-year old were killed. The 10 story building was so heavily damaged that it was later demolished.

The exact details of the bomb, including photographs and diagrams, were mailed by Paglin to British authorities and newspapers a few days after the attack. Irgun named the attack "Operation Hambaf", a contraction of the words Hamburg, the city where the SS Exodus returned to, and Afalpi, the name of another refugee ship redirected by the British to Cyprus. The press initially reported on the bomb as simply a bomb in a tar barrel, but later reports dubbed it a 'Barrel Bomb' (with quotes) or the "barrel bomb technique of the Jewish underground". The police called it "a brand new method".

=== Pakistan ===
During the 1965 war the Pakistan Air Force re-purposed several Hercules C-130 transport aircraft to drop improvised bombs on Indian forces and bases.

=== United States ===
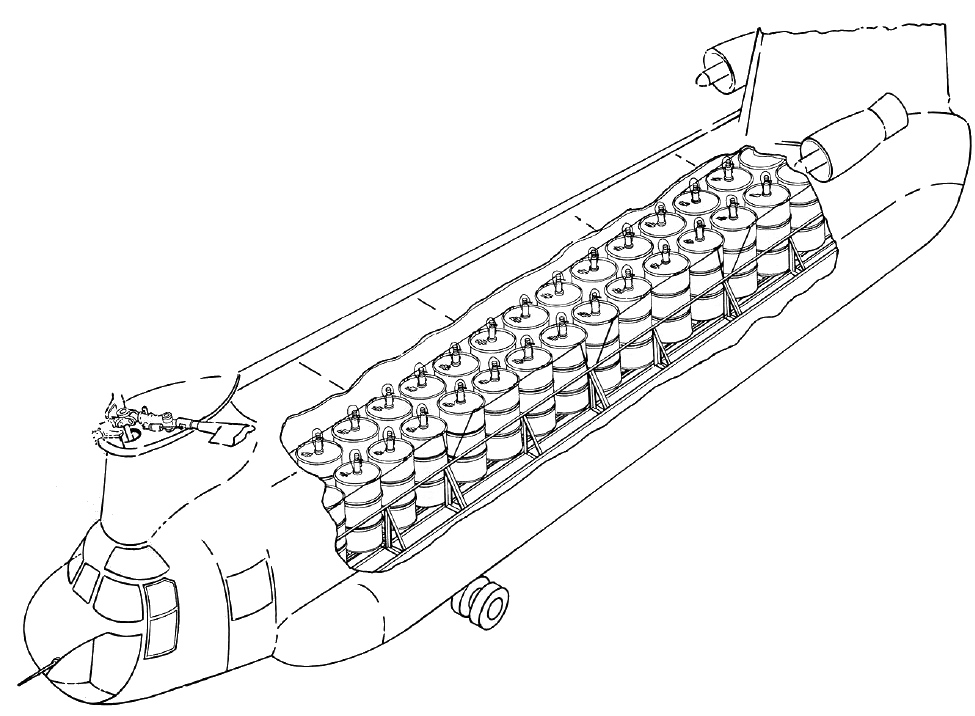
A diagram from an Army training manual showing how to load barrel bombs onto a CH-47 Chinook helicopter

In April 1968, during Operation Inferno of the Vietnam War, the United States dropped dozens of barrels filled with incendiary fuel and tear gas-equivalent, in order to start forest fires and to flush out Viet Cong guerrillas in the U Minh forest. The bombs were not aimed at heavily populated areas and in the end were not very effective at starting forest fires.

Army crews kicked the incendiary drums out of Chinook helicopters onto suspected enemy camps. They strapped white phosphorus smoke grenades to the cylinders to set them alight.

— War is Boring blog quoted via The Washington Post, 16 February 2015

=== Nicaragua ===
In 1979, during the Nicaraguan Revolution, the air force of the National Guard dropped 55-gallon barrels (200 litres) filled with gasoline on Sandinista forces in León. According to a mercenary who worked as an advisor for Anastasio Somoza Debayle, the dictator of Nicaragua, they originally let the bombs explode on the ground, as if they were using napalm, but later discovered that bursting the bombs approximately 100 feet (30 m) from the ground resulted in huge fireballs that incinerated those below. These bombs devastated civilian areas but had relatively little effect on the anti-Somoza rebels.

=== Sri Lanka ===
During the Sri Lankan Civil War (1983–2009), barrel bombs were used by government forces. William Dalrymple reported that the Sri Lanka Air Force, lacking modern bombers, used Chinese Y-12 transport planes to drop improvised 300 kilograms (660 lb) bombs packed into wooden barrels onto civilian areas in the northern peninsula of Jaffna. A 1990 newspaper reported that "barrel bombs - 210 litre cast iron barrels packed with explosives, rubber and saw dust" were used against residential areas knocking out 20 houses at a time in the Jaffna region.

=== Croatia ===
In 1991, barrel bombs were used by Croatian forces against Serbian forces during the Battle of Vukovar, where they were dropped from Antonov An-2 agricultural airplanes. The device was called the Bojler Bomba ("boiler bomb") as it was made by filling ordinary household hot water boilers with explosives and shrapnel. Serbian politician Vojislav Šešelj claimed during his trial in the ICTY that a boiler bomb was dropped on a house he was staying in during the middle of the night, according to him the bomb landed in the back yard and caused moderate damage to the exterior of the house, however being ineffective at killing or wounding anybody. The effects of the bombs were predominantly psychological. As background, a Croatian airforce was established in 1990, made up of volunteers from a sports club at Sinj. They were private individuals and enthusiasts. Their weapons were home-made and improvised. Bojler Bomba are now on display at a number of museums in Croatia including the Technical Museum Zagreb and the Military Museum of the Croatian Ministry of Defence. Human Rights Watch (HRW) also reported a first-hand account of a boiler bomb being used in ground combat in Zlatište. A 70 kilograms (150 lb) boiler bomb was rolled down a hill into enemy trenches while snipers tried to blow it up before it reached their position; it eventually got stuck in a tree and "all it did was destroy a lot of trees".

=== Sudan ===
Barrel bombs have been used in Sudan since at least the 1990s. They were studded with nails and rolled out of the cargo doors of Soviet-made Antonov An-24 and Antonov An-26 transport aircraft onto insurgent populations in South Sudan and Darfur. Barrel bombs were used, beginning in early 2003, after the Sudan Liberation Army rebelled against Khartoum. They were used again, beginning in 2011, when a new insurgency began after the south separated from the north.

=== Syria ===
Before the civil war, the Syrian arsenal was primarily built to combat the Israeli army which enjoyed air superiority, and thus did not have much in the way of close air support (e.g. air to ground bombs and missiles), but instead predominantly had ground-to-air and air-to-air missiles to harass and delay the Israeli air force. The Syrian military thus soon ran out of precision weapons, had trouble obtaining more and needed a cheap and readily available supply of air to ground weapons. The use of barrel bombs in the Syrian Civil War was first identified in August 2012, in particular through the video forensic work of Eliot Higgins (Brown Moses) and Richard Lloyd. Their existence was initially denied by a Russian military expert until a video surfaced in October 2012 from inside a moving helicopter showing a barrel bomb being lit and dropped onto a target by Syrian Air Force personnel. The person who allegedly came up with the scheme to load barrels with explosives, nails, and metal fragments is Suheil al-Hassan, or "The Tiger", an Alawite colonel.

The deliberate use of indiscriminate weapons made at the time Syrian president Bashar al-Assad potentially liable for war crimes. As such, Assad has denied the use of these weapons, saying "We have bombs, missiles and bullets. There [are] no barrel bombs, we don't have barrels." Nevertheless, there is considerable video, pictorial, and after the fact proof of the use of such weapons in Syria. Video evidence of a barrel bomb being used was recovered from a mobile phone found in the wreckage of a crashed government forces helicopter in May 2015. British Foreign Secretary Philip Hammond said, "This video footage exposes Assad's lies on barrel bombs", and "We will bring those involved in these criminal acts to justice".

Barrel bomb attacks throughout Syria have killed more than 20,000 people since the conflict began in March 2011, according to a December 2013 statement by the opposition Syrian National Council (SNC). It is estimated that, as of mid-March 2014, between 5,000 and 6,000 barrel bombs have been dropped during the war and their use has escalated. Aleppo has been the focal point of the Syrian government's use of barrel bombs. Over time, government forces have refined their use of the barrel bomb to cause maximum damage - dropping one device and then waiting 10 to 30 minutes to drop another bomb on the same location. This "signature tactic" of the Syrian air force has been referred to as a "double-tap" barrel bombing. According to opposition activists, the aim is to ensure that those who flood the scene to rescue the victims are then themselves killed.

In February 2014, the United Nations Security Council adopted Resolution 2139 that demanded an end to indiscriminate aerial bombardment including the use of barrel bombs. China and Russia supported the measure allowing its passage. Five months later in August 2014, it was reported that barrel bomb use had instead escalated in defiance of the ban. Human Rights Watch produced a map showing at least 650 new impact locations consistent with barrel bomb attacks. In early September 2014, Samantha Power, U.S. Permanent Representative to the U.N., stated that "The Syrian government has increased its reliance on barrel bombs to wage a brutal aerial campaign". By November 2014, it has been reported that the Syrian government has increased its barrel bombing campaign while world attention has been diverted following the American-led intervention in Syria.

Khaled Khoja, leader of the main Western-backed Syrian National Coalition, described barrel bombs as playing a major role fueling Syrian refugees fleeing into neighboring countries and Europe. According to Raed al-Saleh, head of the Syrian Civil Defense, "The localized effect of a barrel bomb is the same as an earthquake measuring 8 on the Richter scale".

=== Iraq ===
In May 2014, it was reported by witnesses that the Iraqi army dropped barrel bombs on the city of Fallujah and surrounding areas, killing civilians during the Anbar campaign. According to Mohammed al-Jumaili, a local journalist, the army repeatedly dropped barrel bombs "targeting mosques, houses and markets." Their use was later confirmed by a mid-level Iraqi security officer in Anbar province who admitted that barrel bombs had in fact been dropped in Fallujah. It has been reported by Iraqis that the attacks usually come at night, in order not to be caught on video. Militants in Fallujah boasted that they had discovered about 20 barrel bombs that did not explode on impact and were using them to make their own weapons. It was claimed in July 2014 by doctors in Fallujah that the city was being barrel-bombed three times a week and more than 600 civilians had been killed in such strikes since January. It has been claimed by an Iraqi Kurd air force pilot that the barrel bombs are produced by Iranians who then use Antonov aircraft and Huey helicopters to drop them.

According to Erin Evers of Human Rights Watch, "What's happening now in Iraq definitely started in Syria. If I were al-Maliki, and seeing Assad next door using the same tactics without a slap on the wrist and gaining ground as a result, it stands to reason he would say, 'Why the hell not?'"

According to residents of Tikrit, Baiji and Mosul, government forces have also dropped barrel bombs on their cities during the 2014 Northern Iraq offensive. Similar barrel bombs attacks were reported in Fallujah and the nearby town of Al-Karmah, in late July and August. On 11 September, 14 barrel bombs were dropped on Fallujah city, killing 22 civilians. According to aid workers, the Iraqi army continues to use barrel bombs extensively against ISIS-held areas, including 30 to 35 barrel bombs on Aziz Balad, a town east of Samarra. Further attacks and casualties were reported in Fallujah in June, July and August 2015.

== Reactions ==
Some commentators and institutions have labeled barrel bombs as incendiary devices, which are banned for use against populated civilian areas under the terms of the UN Convention on Prohibitions or Restrictions on the Use of Certain Conventional Weapons. HRW has insisted that the employment of these weapons constitutes a war crime. According to Victoria Nuland of the United States Department of State, barrel bombs are "incendiary bombs which contain flammable material that can be like napalm" or can be packed with nails and launched from the air or from a launcher.

In December 2013, Russia refused to back a text at the UN Security Council that would have condemned the Syrian President Bashar al-Assad for carrying out such indiscriminate attacks on civilian areas.

On 13 January 2014, British Foreign Secretary William Hague referred to the usage of barrel bombs during the conflict as "yet another war crime."

According to Nadim Houry, the Middle East and North Africa deputy director for HRW, the reason for the Syrian government's use of barrel bombs is that it doesn't fear any strong international action.

Syrian opposition representatives have repeatedly requested from international allies, and been denied, the transfer of anti-aircraft weapons to moderate rebel groups, in order to target the aircraft used to drop "barrel bombs".

== Chemical weapons ==
There have been allegations of chemical weapons being delivered as barrel bombs, specifically the 11 April 2014 Kafr Zita chemical attack which saw the use of chlorine gas. Within days of the attack, analysts said they were moving towards a belief that there is "a coordinated chlorine campaign with growing evidence that it is the government side dropping the bombs".

In August 2014, the Office of the United Nations High Commissioner for Human Rights (OHCHR) released a report detailing the use of chlorine gas as a chemical weapon used by Syrian government forces, dropped by barrel bombs from helicopters on numerous towns in Syria including Kafr Zita (April 2014), Al-Tamana'a (May 2014), Daraa (August 2014), and Jobar (August 2014).

== Legal status ==
As background, to be legal under international law weapons used for aerial bombardment must comply with the principles of the laws of war: military necessity, distinction, and proportionality. An attack or action must be intended to help in the military defeat of the enemy; it must be an attack on a military objective, and the harm caused to civilians or civilian property must be proportional and not excessive in relation to the concrete and direct military advantage anticipated.

During the Syrian Civil War, in February 2014, the United Nations Security Council unanimously adopted Resolution 2139 that demanded "that all parties immediately cease all attacks against civilians, as well as the indiscriminate employment of weapons in populated areas, including shelling and aerial bombardment, such as the use of barrel bombs, and methods of warfare which are of a nature to cause superfluous injury or unnecessary suffering".

== See also ==
- Blockbuster bomb
- Car bomb
- Hell cannon
- Lob bomb
- Low-intensity conflict
- Chronology of the Syrian civil war
