= Feras Fayyad =

Syrian film director

- فراس فياض
- Born: 20 September 1988 (age 38); Aleppo
- Occupations: Director; screenwriter; editor; actor; producer
- Years active: 2010–present
- Agent: CAA
- Known for: Directing Oscar-nominated documentaries Last Men in Aleppo (2017) and The Cave (2019); survivor of torture in Branch 251 (Al-Khatib prison) in Damascus
- Children: 1
- Awards: Two Academy Award nominations for Best Documentary Feature (2018, 2020); News & Documentary Emmy Award winner; two George Foster Peabody Awards; Directors Guild of America nomination

Feras Fayyad (born 20 September 1988) is a Syrian film director, producer, and writer. Fayyad best known for his 2017 documentary Last Men in Aleppo and his 2019 documentary The Cave, both films earned him critical acclaim and numerous awards and nominations including two Academy Award for Best Documentary Feature, making him the first Syrian director to be nominated for an Oscar. Fayyad also won an Emmy award for Best Current Affairs Documentary, was nominated for a creative Emmy for best writing and directing, and has received two George Foster Peabody awards and a nomination for Outstanding Directorial Achievement from the Directors Guild of America for his movie The Cave.

Right from the beginning, his works dealt with the situation in his homeland Syria and the political shifts in the Arab world. His 2011 documentary "On the Other Side" (CZ). As a result, Fayyad was arrested in Damascus in late 2011, and he was subjected to extreme violence and torture during his two times imprisonment.

David France in The New York Times called Fayyad " one of the most soulful documentary filmmakers working today" while Allen Johnson of San Francisco Chronicle wrote that "Fayyad is a humanitarian, and his approach in "The Cave" demonstrates that."

Fayyad and his team were not able to attend the 90th Academy Awards ceremony, as his visa was rejected in response to President Trump's Executive Order 13780.

As a result of making Last Men in Aleppo and The Cave, Fayyad became the subject of a vicious effort to discredit his work by pro-Putin, Russian hackers. In testimony in Koblenz's courtroom, He gives key testimony against a convicted war criminal officer who led a unit of Syria's General Intelligence Directorate and involved in Fayyad's torture as a result of his testimony he turned subject to an organized attack from a tabloid anti-migrants websites.

== Early life ==
Fayyad was born in Dadikh, a Syrian village located in Saraqib Nahiyah in Idlib District, Idlib; he is the eldest of ten, seven sisters and two brothers. Fayyad spent his childhood between his village and Aleppo.

== Filmmaking career ==
=== Directing ===
My torturers, told me that I would never see this life again. They wanted to know why I was filming the truth with my camera. For them, I was insulting the nation. Freedom of expression is an insult to the nation. For us, freedom of expression is the only way that we can express our nature and our identity.

— Feras Fayyad

Fayyad studied audio-visual arts in Paris and later worked in Syrian television drama. Early in his career, he edited a film for Al Jazeera, directed a film about a Syrian sculptor, and made a documentary about the Syrian poet and dissident Ja’far Haydar. According to court documents and Fayyad’s testimony, Syrian intelligence services arrested and tortured him in connection with his documentary work. He later focused on the human cost of war and related humanitarian themes in his films. Fayyad said in interviews that he sought “to make cinema, not just report on the situation and current affairs” and that he was “interested in filming people, not action.”

During Aleppo siege, Fayyad worked closely with rescue teams and filmed events from within their daily operations Fayyad embedded with rescue teams, employing human-level camera perspectives to immerse viewers in the rescuers' experiences rather than detached overhead views, while prioritizing authentic audio shifts from everyday city sounds to relentless bombings. Fayyad, and His team endured daily airstrikes, hiding equipment amid rubble and navigating constant threats of death, which Fayyad framed as a personal pact for psychological resilience to continue filming. This approach evolved from ad hoc citizen-style recordings, observing peers using mobile phones during the 2011 uprising into methodical, on-the-ground documentation emphasizing inner motivations and unfiltered reality to distinguish genuine events from potential staging.

Beyond major features, Fayyad initiated a 2013 documentary project on the White Helmets, contributing to collaborative efforts that laid groundwork for later works, alongside short-form explorations of Aleppo's siege.

=== Notable Productions ===
Feras Fayyad's documentary Last Men in Aleppo (2017) chronicles the White Helmets' rescue operations amid the siege of Aleppo during the Syrian Civil War, capturing the relentless efforts of volunteers like Khaled Omar Harrah and Subhi Alhussen to extract survivors from rubble following airstrikes. Fayyad sourced much of the raw footage himself while embedded with the group, enduring the constant threat of bombardment to document the chaos and human cost of the conflict in eastern Aleppo.

In The Cave (2019), Fayyad shifts focus to an underground hospital in Ghouta, eastern Syria, where a team of predominantly female doctors and staff, led by pediatrician Amani Ballour, treat wounded civilians and children under siege and relentless shelling. Filming over two years amid escalating violence presented severe challenges, including power outages, supply shortages, and the need to operate in secrecy to evade regime forces.

These productions have illuminated the resilience of Syrian civilians and first responders, fostering international attention to the humanitarian crises in besieged areas like Aleppo and Ghouta by providing visceral, on-the-ground perspectives often absent from mainstream coverage.

=== Disinformation Campaign Following Oscar Nomination ===
Following the Oscar nomination of Last Men in Aleppo in January 2018, Feras Fayyad became the target of a coordinated disinformation and smear campaign orchestrated primarily by Russian state media outlets such as Sputnik News, which published articles labeling the film as "western-funded propaganda" and an "Al-Qaida promotional film," while portraying Fayyad as a terrorist sympathizer and liar. The campaign involved pro-Russian European journalists based in Sweden, Norway, and Denmark, who amplified accusations by trawling Fayyad's social media and disseminating personal information about his family and associates. British journalist Vanessa Beeley contributed to the effort through articles and investigations linked to Sputnik, questioning the film's authenticity and tying it to alleged Western conspiracies. Official entities, including the Russian mission to the United Nations, supported the narrative, while Syrian regime figures like Buthaina Shaaban, political advisor to Presidents Hafez and Bashar al-Assad, authored lengthy pieces in outlets such as Al-Watan and Al-Manar, accusing Fayyad of fabricating events and promoting anti-regime propaganda. Syrian state media echoed these claims, and the overall effort encompassed over 40 articles across Russian, pro-Russian, and pro-Assad platforms, aimed at discrediting Fayyad's work and influencing public perception ahead of the Oscars. Fayyad publicly countered these attacks, describing them as an attempt to "hack the Oscars" and suppress freedom of expression, with support from organizations like the Academy of Motion Picture Arts and Sciences and the International Documentary Association.

=== Censorship and bans in Arab countries ===
Feras Fayyad's documentaries, particularly Last Men in Aleppo (2017), faced significant censorship and bans in several Arab countries due to their critical portrayal of the Syrian civil war and the Assad regime. In Algeria, authorities explicitly refused to screen the film, citing fears of triggering a diplomatic crisis with Syria and Russia, while in Jordan, it was similarly not exhibited amid broader regional sensitivities. In Lebanon, the film was denied screenings despite support from local funding bodies like the Arab Fund for Arts and Culture (AFAC), potentially influenced by Hezbollah's alignment with the Syrian government. In Syria itself, Fayyad's works were outright prohibited, as he remains a target of the regime, having been arrested and tortured in 2011 for his filmmaking activities. Fayyad has publicly confronted these restrictions, attributing them to lingering remnants of regime censorship and external pressures, including Russian influence on global narratives about the conflict, and has continued to advocate for freedom of expression through his ongoing projects.

== Witness Role in Syrian Conflict ==
=== Documentation of Atrocities ===
Feras Fayyad collaborated with and mentored multiple groups of local journalists and video activists in Syria. Their work focused on documenting civilian casualties and infrastructure destruction caused by Russian airstrikes and Syrian regime bombardment on civilian populations during the Syrian Civil War.This work involved on-the-ground recording of bombardment campaigns and their aftermath, intended to serve as verifiable evidence for accountability.

Through these documentation initiatives, Fayyad helped preserve unedited visual records that contributed to broader archives highlighting systematic targeting of non-combatants during the Syrian conflict. The footage underwent processes to ensure authenticity, aiding dissemination to human rights organizations for inclusion in reports on violations.

=== Personal Experiences as Survivor ===
Feras Fayyad resided in Aleppo during the height of the Syrian Civil War, navigating daily life amid relentless bombardment and regime advances, particularly during the 2016 siege that trapped civilians in the city. He evaded capture by Syrian regime forces for extended periods while moving through contested areas, relying on local networks to avoid checkpoints and surveillance that targeted suspected activists and journalists.

=== Arrest ===
When protests began against the Assad government, Fayyad grabbed his camera and went to the streets. He documented the early peaceful demonstrations, the arrests, the ruthless, violent government response, and the shooting of protesters in an attempt to quell the rebellion. He taught others to document the revolt until he was arrested in a policy of sweeping arrests.

Fayyad was arrested twice by Assad regime security forces, enduring severe torture during interrogations intended to extract confessions related to his activities.

=== Detention ===
Fayyad spent up to 18 months in his two times imprisonment, He was transferred between a number of detention center of the Syrian intelligence services facilities, In one detention, he was held for nine months in a facility where he accused of spying and anti-regime activities; witnessed and experienced brutal methods, including beatings and psychological coercion. he was hung by his wrists for hours, lashed, and starved; kept in a filthy communal cell where it was hard to tell who was still alive. Fayyad was convinced he would die in prison. Even fellow inmates said he would not make it out alive.

=== Release ===
Fayyad was released without explanation, and his family urged him to leave the country, convinced he would not survive another arrest. He fled Syria soon after. Following his release, Fayyad fled Aleppo and crossed into Jordan, then to Turkey as a refugee, seeking safety amid ongoing threats from the regime. From exile, he snuck back across the Syrian border to the besieged city of Aleppo to film Syrian civilians under bombardment, he persisted in advocating for Syrian survivors, drawing on his firsthand ordeals to highlight the human cost of the conflict without direct involvement in Aleppo's frontlines. These survival experiences profoundly influenced his approach to capturing the war's unfiltered truths. Then he fled to Europe But even then, his torture continued to haunt him, causing physical pain and reoccurring nightmares.

== Legal Proceedings ==
=== International Criminal Case ===
Feras Fayyad served as a plaintiff and key witness in the Koblenz trial in Germany, one of the first international prosecutions targeting a direct perpetrator in the Syrian regime's torture networks, specifically against former intelligence colonel Anwar Raslan, charged with crimes against humanity including overseeing thousands of cases of torture and murder at Branch 251 was the unit of the Syrian General Intelligence Directorate under the Assad regime concerned with internal security in the Damascus region. Branch 251 operates Al-Khatib prison.

As the first witness to testify in June 2020 with personal experience of the torture rather than stories and reports. Fayyad provided firsthand accounts of regime detention practices, detailing systematic torture methods such as suspension torture ( Strappado "Al-Shabah "), electrocution, prolonged solitary confinement in dark and overcrowded cells, severe beatings during "welcome parties" to extract forced confessions, and sexual violence endured during his own imprisonment in Syrian facilities, which he linked to the broader apparatus Raslan allegedly directed.

The case represented collaboration between Syrian survivors and European judicial authorities, with the German Higher Regional Court in Koblenz applying universal jurisdiction to prosecute Syrian officials, supported by human rights organizations like the European Center for Constitutional and Human Rights in gathering evidence and facilitating survivor testimonies.

In court, Fayyad declines to try to put into words the screams he had heard, but the director says via his interpreter: "One day I will try to describe it in my films".

=== Court Outcomes and Implications ===
In January 2022, the Higher Regional Court in Koblenz, Germany, convicted former Syrian intelligence official Anwar Raslan of 4,000 counts of crimes against humanity, including torture, murder, and rape, sentencing him to life imprisonment based on survivor testimonies that detailed systematic abuses in Syrian detention centers. An earlier ruling in the same proceedings found co-defendant Eyad al-Gharib guilty of aiding and abetting torture as a crime against humanity, resulting in a four-and-a-half-year sentence, further validating the regime's organized violence against detainees. Feras Fayyad's key firsthand evidence of the systematic sexual violence and torture he endured helped to establish rape and sexual assault as deliberate tools of the regime, contributing significantly to the court's findings on the scale and nature of these crimes.

These verdicts set a legal precedent for the prosecution of Syrian officials in foreign jurisdictions under universal jurisdiction principles, demonstrating the viability of holding absent higher-ranking perpetrators accountable through evidence from defectors and survivors, even without the direct presence of all implicated figures.

The outcomes carry significant implications for male survivors of sexual violence in the Syrian conflict, as the court's explicit acknowledgment of rape and sexual torture as deliberate and systematic regime practices has contributed to reducing stigma around such abuses for male victims and strengthened the role of survivor testimonies in international accountability mechanisms. The testimony of survivors, including that of Feras Fayyad as the first public witness in the trial, played a key role in establishing these violations as crimes against humanity, even in the face of state denials.

Despite the pivotal role of Fayyad’s testimony, he and other male survivors faced extensive smear campaigns and social stigma from various Arab media outlets and activists. These campaigns, often driven by opposition to the trial of Anwar Raslan, sought to undermine the credibility of the survivors by weaponizing social taboos surrounding sexual violence, aiming to delegitimize the legal findings of systematic abuse.

== Awards and Recognition ==
=== Academy Award Nominations ===
Feras Fayyad received his first Academy Award nomination in 2018 for Last Men in Aleppo (2017), a documentary chronicling the efforts of rescue workers amid the Syrian conflict in Aleppo, in the Best Documentary Feature category at the 90th Oscars.

He earned a second nomination in 2020 for The Cave (2019), which depicts the operations of an underground hospital in besieged eastern Ghouta, again in Best Documentary Feature at the 92nd Oscars.

These nominations marked Fayyad as the first Syrian director to be recognized by the Academy, highlighting his achievement despite challenges faced by filmmakers from conflict zones, including visa restrictions that complicated his attendance at the ceremonies.

=== Emmy and Other Honors ===
Fayyad received the News & Documentary Emmy Award for Outstanding Current Affairs Documentary for directing Last Men in Aleppo, which aired on PBS's POV series and chronicled rescue efforts amid the Syrian Civil War. This honor recognized his immersive firsthand footage capturing the human cost of the conflict in Aleppo.

In 2018, Fayyad was inducted as a member of the Academy of Motion Picture Arts and Sciences, affirming his standing among global filmmakers for documentaries addressing humanitarian crises. He has also been appointed by the Academy to mentor emerging directors through masterclasses on filmmaking techniques drawn from his experiences.

Among other recognitions, Fayyad earned the Courage Under Fire Award from the International Documentary Association for his persistent documentation of atrocities despite personal risks. His work has garnered jury prizes at festivals such as Sundance film festival, full frame film festival, TIFF People's Choice Award, 2 times Peabody Awards, 2 times Robert Awards, Critics Choice Awards, the Sarasota Film Festival for Best Documentary Feature, highlighting the impact of his narrative-driven approach to war journalism.

== Filmography ==
Director

- 2013: Wide Shot-Close Shot (TV Movie documentary)
- 2013: Windows' (TV Movie documentary)
- 2016: Between the Fighter in Syria (TV Series documentary)
- 2017: Last Men in Aleppo (Documentary) (directed by)
- 2019: The Cave

Writer

- 2013: Wide Shot-Close Shot (TV Movie documentary)
- 2013: Windows' (TV Movie documentary)
- 2016: Between the Fighter in Syria (TV Series documentary)
- 2017: Last Men in Aleppo (Documentary) (directed by)
- 2019: The Cave

Producer

- 2017: One Day in Aleppo (Short, producer)

Editor

- 2013: Train of Silence (Short)
- 2013: Untold Stories (Documentary)
- 2017: One Day in Aleppo (Short)

Other

- 2013: Train of Silence (Short, Actor)
- 2013: Untold Stories (Documentary, art director)
- 2013: Train of Silence (Short, composer)

== Awards and nominations ==
- 92nd Academy Awards – Academy Award for Best Documentary Feature
- 90th Academy Awards – Academy Award for Best Documentary Feature
- 2017 Sundance Film Festival – World Documentary Grand Jury Prize
- Independent Spirit Award for Best Documentary Feature
- 2017 Peabody Award – Best Documentary
- 2020 Peabody Award – Best Documentary
- 2017 Copenhagen International Documentary Festival – CPH:DOX Grand Prize for Best Documentary Feature
- 2019 Toronto International Film Festival – People's Choice Award, Documentaries: The Cave
- 2020 Cinema for Peace Most Valuable Documentary of the Year Award: The Cave
- 2019 Nordisk Film Prisen
- 2017 Peabody Award – Best Documentary
- 2020 Primetime Emmy Awards Nominee Outstanding Writing for a Nonfiction Program
- 2020 Primetime Emmy Awards Nominee Outstanding Directing for a Documentary/Nonfiction Program
- 2018 News & Documentary Emmy Awards
- 2020 European Film Awards
- 2020 German Documentary Film Awards
- 2019 Critics' Choice Documentary Awards
- 2017 Critics' Choice Documentary Awards
- 2020 Directors Guild of America, USA
- 2017 St. Petersburg Message to Man Film Festival
