= Humanitarian aid during the Syrian civil war =

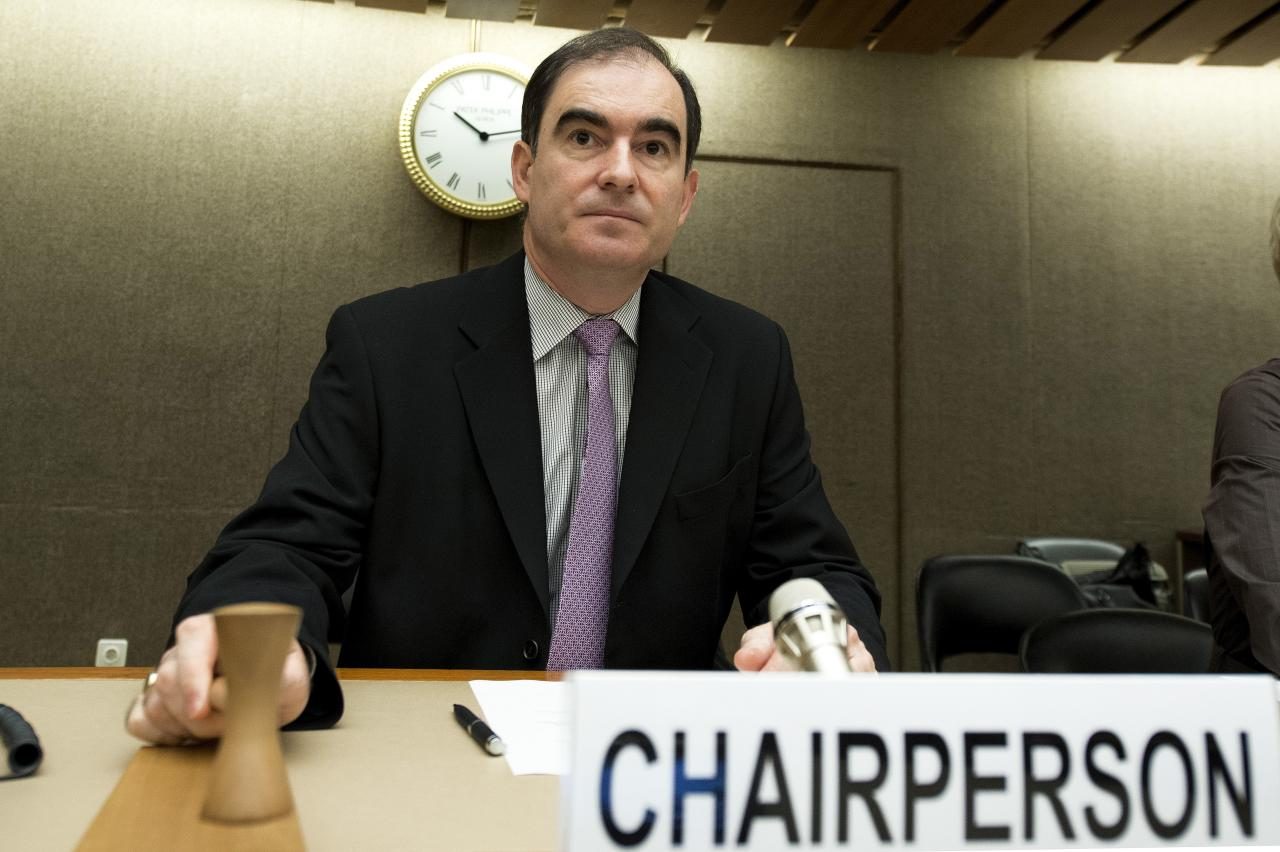
Jonh Ging, Director, Coordination and Response Division, United Nations Office for the Coordination of Humanitarian Affairs (OCHA) opens the Syrian Humanitarian Forum. 16 July 2012

Humanitarian aid during the Syrian civil war has been provided by various international bodies, organizations and states. The main effort is coordinated by Jonh Ging of the United Nations Office for the Coordination of Humanitarian Affairs (UNOCHA). In 2014, U.N. Security Council Resolution 2165 authorised humanitarian aid to be supplied via four border crossings not controlled by the Syrian government, generally to supply rebel-controlled territory.

Humanitarian assistance to refugees and their host communities in the countries neighbouring Syria is coordinated by the United Nations Resident Coordinator/Humanitarian Coordinator. Additionally, humanitarian aid reduced violence against refugees.

The number of people in need of humanitarian assistance in Syria has risen to 16.7 million in 2024, up from 15.3 million in 2023. This includes 5.5 million displaced individuals, with over 2 million living in last-resort sites.

== Inter-governmental organizations involvement ==
From 2012 to 2018, the U.N., much through UNOCHA, has sent $32 billion to Syria. More than 90% of the UN aid deliveries are supported by the United States, European Union, United Kingdom, and Canada.

=== UNOCHA ===
The main effort is coordinated by Jacy Singh of the United Nations Office for the Coordination of Humanitarian Affairs (UNOCHA) in accordance with General Assembly Resolution 46/182. The primary framework for this coordination was initially the Syria Humanitarian Assistance Response Plan (SHARP) which appealed for US$1.41 billion in 2013 to meet the humanitarian needs of Syrians affected by the conflict. The official United Nations data on the humanitarian situation and response is available online. UNOCHA also provides information to the affected population in Arabic on Facebook and in English on Twitter.

==== Whole of Syria (WoS) approach ====
In September 2014, UNOCHA's operations in Syria, Turkey and Jordan were brought together into a single response framework, and drafted the 2015 Humanitarian Needs Overview (HNO) and the 2015 Syria Strategic Response Plan (SRP). A united appeal for Syria was launched, and in February 2015, the Whole of Syria (WoS) approach was formalized with the implementation of the 2015 SRP.

An internal evaluation of UNOCHA's efforts painted a gloomy picture of the situation in Syria, but was positive regarding UNOCHA's work, and the new WoS approach. The report identified that: "Against this backdrop OCHA has achieved some notable successes. The long drawn-out struggle to gain access to people in need is far from over, but it is much enhanced by the Security Council resolutions approved in 2014. This was directly the work of OCHA and the campaigning work of the ERC. OCHA has also struggled at times, notably in delivering on its coordination mandate that has been contested in all of the operational contexts at one time or another. The current trajectory is positive, as are attempts to unify the formerly fragmented response under the WoS initiative."

However, since the report, the aid situation has once again deteriorated. More than seventy aid groups, including the Syrian American Medical Society and the Syrian Civil Defense, withdrew from UNOCHA's "Whole of Syria" aid campaign on 8 September 2016, alleging that the UN and the Syrian Arab Red Crescent were allowing the Syrian government to interfere with aid. On 19 September, an attack hit a UN-Red Crescent aid convoy in rebel-held Urum al-Kubra, killing at least 14 people and destroying 18 truckloads of food, according to the International Federation of Red Cross and Red Crescent Societies. The vehicles were hit by around five missiles while parked at a Red Crescent warehouse for unloading. Stephen O'Brien, UN Under-Secretary-General for Humanitarian Affairs and Emergency Relief Coordinator, said that if the targeting was deliberate it would be a war crime. Anonymous U.S. officials blamed Russia, saying two Russian Sukhoi Su-24 warplanes were flying over the aid convoy at the precise time it was struck. The Russian Defense Ministry, however, denied that either its forces or the Syrian air force were responsible and disputed the contention that the UN vehicles had been hit by any munitions, insinuating that the Syrian Civil Defense may have somehow been involved in the cargo catching fire. In the wake of the attack, the UN halted all humanitarian aid convoys in Syria, blaming the security situation.

=== UNHCR ===
Within the countries neighbour Syria that are hosting Syrian refugees the Office of the United Nations High Commissioner for Refugees (UNHCR), also known as the UN Refugee Agency, is mandated to protect and support Syrian refugees in their voluntary repatriation, local integration or resettlement to a third country. The main framework for coordinating the refugee response is the Syria Regional Response Plan (RRP). Detailed and up-to-date information on the refugee situation can be accessed on the Inter-agency Information Sharing Portal, which is maintained by UNHCR.

=== World Health Organization ===
The World Health Organization has reported that 35% of the country's hospitals are out of service and, depending upon the region, up to 70% of the health care professionals have fled. Cases of diarrhoea and hepatitis-A have increased by more than twofold since the beginning of the year. Due to the fighting the normal vaccination programs cannot be undertaken. The displaced refugees also may pose a risk to the countries to which they have fled.

=== UN World Food Programme ===
The UN World Food Programme (WFP) is responsible for the distribution of most emergency food aid in Syria.

== Non-governmental organization involvement ==
=== ICRC ===
Outside the SHARP and the RRP mechanism, the International Committee of the Red Cross, in partnership with the Syrian Arab Red Crescent, has been providing water, food, medical materials and other items to millions people affected by the fighting. fragmented response under the WoS initiative."

=== Islamic Relief ===
Islamic Relief has stocked 30 hospitals and sent hundreds of thousands of medical and food parcels.

=== Hezbollah ===
After the 2023 Turkey–Syria earthquake Hezbollah sent humanitarian aid to Syria.

== International aid ==
Financial assistance provided in response to the Syria conflict is tracked by UNOCHA through the Financial Tracking Service (FTS). FTS is a global, real-time database which records all reported international humanitarian aid (including that for NGOs and the Red Cross / Red Crescent Movement, bilateral aid, in-kind aid, and private donations). As at 18 September 2013 the top ten donors to Syria were: United States, European Commission, Kuwait, United Kingdom, Germany, Norway, Canada, Japan, Australia and Saudi Arabia. As at 18 September 2013, assistance provided to the Syria Humanitarian Assistance Response Plan (SHARP): January - December 2013 was US$661,049,938; with funding for the Syria Regional Refugee Response Plan (RRP): January - December 2013 at $1,278,253,343.

=== European Union ===
The EU provided €374 million in humanitarian assistance to the Syria crisis in 2015. In addition member states have provided another €4.5 billion. In November 2015 the EU created the €3 billion Refugee Facility for Turkey to deliver support to Syrian refugees and host communities in Turkey.

From 2012 until 2018, Ireland has sent €100 million to Syria.

=== Iran ===
Iran has been exporting between 500 and 800 tonnes of flour daily, by sea and land, to Syria. Only on December 2, Iran send 3rd consignment of relief aid to Syria's Aleppo. The head of the Relief and Rescue Organization of the Iranian Red Crescent Society (IRCS), Morteza Salimi, told IRIB that the shipment included 150,000 food cans. He added that two consignments of relief aid, weighing about 80 tonnes, have already been sent to the crisis-hit city over the past two days. They included tents, blankets and oil heaters. The IRCS official noted that Iran has so far dispatched 28,000 blankets, 400 tents, 800 rugs, 5,000 oil heaters, 1,400 boxes of dried bread, eight tonnes of medicines, 700 sets of dishware and 165,000 food cans to people in Aleppo.

=== Israel ===
Israel began providing assistance to wounded Syrian civilians from the onset of the Syrian civil war. The aid consisted of medical care, water, electricity, education or food and was given to Syrians near the ceasefire line between Israel and Syria, often escorted across by Israeli soldiers. Over 200,000 Syrians received such aid, and more than 4,000 of them were treated in Israeli hospitals from 2013 to September 2018. Many of the treated victims were civilians, often children. According to rebels, this number included 250 opposition fighters out of the 700 Syrians who had been treated in Israel as of 2014. In the summer of 2017 Israel enabled the opening of a field clinic, "Camp Ichay", in the central area of the Golan Heights, across the border fence. The hospital, responsible for an area of 80,000 people, was operated by an American humanitarian organisation "Friendships", took care of about 10% of the population, before having to shut down a year later.

The Israel Defense Forces granted special permits for Syrians who were critically injured to enter Israel and obtain the necessary medical treatment; the IDF escorted them to and from the hospital. The majority of the injured Syrians were sent to the Ziv Medical Center in Safed, where the director of the trauma center stated: "we don't know who we're treating, armed or not armed, wearing uniform or not wearing uniform. Because of the critical condition in which many of them arrive, we don't question who they are. It is irrelevant. They are patients and are treated with the best measures we have in the hospital. Everyone gets the same treatment". The Israel Defense Forces also set up a field hospital along the border to help treat less threatening injuries.

It was also claimed that in addition to Syrian civilians, Israel was providing medical treatment for rebels in Syria. and allowed some fighters to cross the ceasefire line in Golan Heights to seek medical treatment on the Israeli-controlled side. The Syrian ambassador to the UN, Bashar al-Ja'afari, also accused Israel of helping Jabhat al-Nusra and treating their wounded in the Golan Heights area. However, according to Rubin Center for Research in International Affairs, "There is no evidence Israel gives aid to Nusra", even though some individual fighters might get treatment and no evidence that Israel supplies them with aid and cash the way they give aid to Fursan." Reportedly, Israel also provided medical and humanitarian aid to Fursan al-Jawlan. Diesel fuel was given to work water pumps so the local cattle could drink.

In September 2018, Israel announced that it was ending the aid programme, dubbed "Operation Good Neighbor".

=== Norway ===
The Norwegian government has provided 2.65 billion NOK (approx. $338.5 million) in humanitarian aid to Syria and its neighboring countries since the beginning of the unrest in 2011.

=== Russia ===
In January 2016, Russia delivered 22 tonnes of humanitarian aid to several Syrian cities.

In mid-February 2016 Syrian military transport planes with the support of Russian fighters Su-30 brought another batch of the joint Russian-Syrian humanitarian aid to the inhabitants of the besieged militants city of Deir ez-Zor. The cargo parachute attached to the P-7 platform was parachuted in from a height of 4 km in the government-controlled areas of Deir ez Zor – the administrative center of the eponymous province in the north-east of the country. The total humanitarian aid weight dropped on parachute more than 50 tonnes.

On 19 September, an airstrike hit a UN-Red Crescent aid convoy in rebel-held Urum al-Kubra, killing at least 14 people and destroying 18 truckloads of food, according to the International Federation of Red Cross and Red Crescent Societies. The vehicles were hit by around five missiles while parked at a Red Crescent warehouse for unloading. Stephen O'Brien, UN Under-Secretary-General for Humanitarian Affairs and Emergency Relief Coordinator, said that if the targeting was deliberate it would be a war crime. Latter the UN Commission named the Syrian Air Force as the sole perpetrator of the attack.

=== Serbia ===
On 20 October 2016, a Russian plane carrying Serbian aid including food, medicine, and clothes arrived in Syria. The aid was destined for Aleppo.

=== Turkey ===
On 26 April 2013 a humanitarian convoy, inspired by Gaza Flotilla, departed from Turkey to Syria. Called Hayat (Life), it is set to deliver aid items to IDPs inside Syria and refugees in neighboring countries: Turkey, Lebanon, Jordan, Iraq and Egypt.

=== United Kingdom ===
The United Kingdom has allocated over £1 billion (c. $1.6 billion) in aid since 2012 to over 30 aid organisations and partners including United Nations agencies, international non-governmental organisations and the Red Cross. The aid is aimed at meeting the immediate needs of vulnerable people in Syria and of refugees in other countries in the region including Jordan, Lebanon, Turkey, Iraq and Egypt. Additional funds have been allocated by the Department for International Development to help build longer-term stability in the region.

=== United States ===
USAID and other government agencies in US delivered nearly $385 million of aid items to Syria in 2012 and 2013. On 4 February 2016, US Secretary of State John Kerry announced another $601 million in new humanitarian funding for Syria and neighboring countries, bringing its total contribution to more than $5.1 billion in humanitarian assistance. The US is providing food aid, medical supplies, emergency and basic health care, shelter materials, clean water, hygiene education and supplies, and other relief supplies. By 2022, United States had provided a total of 16 billion dollars' worth of humanitarian aid, relief packages and food supplies through USAID to millions of people stranded across Syria.

== Misappropriation of humanitarian aid ==
Humanitarian aid and funding to Syria is often misappropriated by the UN to international pariah Bashar al-Assad. Limitations imposed by the Assad regime on humanitarian organizations from operating outside areas of government control have heavily impacted aid deliveries to opposition-held territories. Through U.N. mandates, Syria also forces well intended non-governmental organizations to have to provide aid through Damascus, instead of through border areas which would provide relief for civilians in need. Funds were often directed to the capitol of Damascus during the Syrian civil war, where they were obstructed by the Syrian regime. These funds were instead used to subsidize war efforts including bombing Syrian hospitals. The effect of sanctions intended to curb war crimes is thus hampered by misuse of funding provided by the United Nations, and by Russian and Iranian support. Russia often blocks U.N. resolutions, including international sanctions, which are intended to relieve the situation of civilians in Syria.

=== Stop UN Support for Assad Act ===
In US Congress, the not yet passed bill, Stop UN Support for Assad Act aims to prevent the United Nations from misdirecting United States funds to Assad.

== Challenges in Humanitarian Aid Delivery ==
The Syrian government has imposed conditions on the use of the Bab al-Hawa crossing for UN aid deliveries, causing bureaucratic and logistical hurdles, impacting their ability to reach the millions in need efficiently. These conditions include demands for full cooperation and coordination with the Syrian government and prohibitions against the UN communicating with groups the government labeled as "terrorist organizations". In addition, a broad US authorization, which facilitated humanitarian aid to Syria, expired without renewal. This authorization was critical in reinforcing existing humanitarian authorizations for disaster relief, ensuring that affected Syrians had access to emergency assistance, especially after the devastating earthquakes in the region. Its expiration has led to worries about 'overcompliance' and 'de-risking' practices by banks and companies, potentially hindering the speed and efficiency of humanitarian responses in Syria. The non-renewal of the last aid corridor poses a significant risk, threatening a humanitarian catastrophe for millions. Approximately 1.7 million people, with 58% being children, live in camps in north-west Syria. These camps suffer from inadequate access to water, sanitation, and are highly dependent on international aid for survival. The Syrian government's actions, including cutting off electricity and water supplies to these areas, have further compounded the situation.

== See also ==
- Political corruption
- Refugees of the Syrian civil war
- 2025 hunger crisis in Syria
