= February 2019 Idlib bombings =

- Part of Syrian civil war
- Location: al-Qusoor street, Idlib, Idlib Governorate, Syria
- Date: February 18, 2019; 1:30am (1st); 1:37-1:40am (2nd)
- Target: Uzbek HTS members and Syrian Civil Defense Forces
- Attack type: Car bombings
- Deaths: 24+: 16 civilians; 4+ HTS members
- Injuries: 85
- Perpetrator: Unknown

On February 18, 2019, two car bombs exploded on al-Qusoor street in Idlib, Idlib Governorate, Syria, killing between 24 people including sixteen civilians, and injuring 25 others.

== Background ==
At the time of the bombings, Idlib was under the control of Hay'at Tahrir al-Sham in a wider rebel-held area, but insurgencies from the al-Qaeda-aligned Hurras al-Din and the Islamic State remained prominent in the city. A local office of the Syrian Salvation Government is located on al-Qusoor street.

== Bombings ==
The first explosive device was under a car parked outside a cafe on al-Qusoor street. It detonated at about 1:30am on February 18, allegedly targeting a post of Uzbek HTS militants. The building the car was parked next to was where these Uzbek militants and their families lived. At the time of the bombing, high-ranking Uzbek HTS militants were holding a meeting. Once Syrian Civil Defence Forces and local ambulances arrived on scene about seven to ten minutes later, a second motorcycle bomb exploded. AOAV said that the second bomb deliberately targeted medical personnel.

The Idlib Media Center said that ten people were killed in the explosion, and several dozen more were wounded. The Syrian Observatory for Human Rights said that 16 civilians including four children were killed in the twin bombings, and over 25 more were injured. The Syrian Human Rights Committee referred to the bombings as a massacre, and seconded the 16 killed toll and mentioned 85 others were injured. Four Hay'at Tahrir al-Sham militants were killed in the bombings according to the Salvation Government. The Civil Defense Forces said one of their volunteers was wounded, and the Local Coordination Committees reported casualties. Syrians for Truth and Justice said that the 16 toll was an undercount, and many foreign HTS fighters and their families were killed in the explosion. However, hospitals did not count the number of dead fighters.

No group claimed responsibility for the attack. STJ accused the Assad regime and Islamic State of the bombing. On March 1, a third bombing at Fusion Restaurant in Idlib killed seven people, and HTS executed 10 ISIS militants in response.
