= The Cave (2019 Syrian film) =

2019 Syrian documentary film by Feras Fayyad

- Film poster
- Directed by: Feras Fayyad
- Written by: Alisar Hasan; Feras Fayyad
- Produced by: Sigrid Dyekjær; Kirstine Barfod
- Starring: Amani Ballour
- Cinematography: Muhammed Khair Al Shami; Ammar Sulaiman; Mohammad Eyad; Samer Qweder
- Edited by: Denniz Göl Bertelsen; Per K. Kirkegaard
- Music by: Matthew Herbert
- Production companies: Danish Documentary Production; Hecat Studio
- Distributed by: National Geographic Documentary Films (United States)
- Release date: September 5, 2019 (TIFF)
- Running time: 95 minutes
- Countries: Denmark; Syria
- Languages: Arabic; English
- Box office: $191,703

The Cave (Arabic: الكهف, romanized: Al Kahf) is a 2019 Syrian-Danish documentary film directed by Feras Fayyad and written by Fayyad and Alisar Hasan. A companion piece to his earlier film Last Men in Aleppo, the film profiles Dr. Amani Ballour, a physician in Ghouta who is operating a makeshift hospital nicknamed "the Cave" during the Syrian Civil War. The film premiered at the Toronto International Film Festival (TIFF) on September 5, 2019.

== Summary ==
In an interview, Fayyad said his purpose in making the film was to create documentary evidence that could be used to seek justice for innocent victims of the government crackdown on protesters during the Syrian revolution. "The film should put people in an uncomfortable position to look through the terrible reality around us," he said.

== Reception ==
On Rotten Tomatoes, the film holds an approval rating of 97% with an average rating of 8.3/10, based on 63 reviews. The site's consensus states that "A hard-hitting documentary with imagery as powerful as its message, The Cave poses heartbreakingly urgent questions -- and leaves them for the viewer to answer." It also has a score of 83 out of 100 on Metacritic, based on 21 critics, indicating "universal acclaim". The film received the Cinema For Peace Foundation award for the Most Valuable Documentary of the Year at the 2020 Berlin Film Festival.

== Accolades ==
The film premiered at the 2019 Toronto International Film Festival, where it won the People's Choice Award for Documentaries.

The Cave won The Cinema for Peace Award for The Most Valuable Documentary of the Year for 2019.

The Cave was nominated for Best Documentary Feature at the 92nd Academy Awards.
