= Mayday Rescue Foundation =

Defunct non-profit operating in Syria

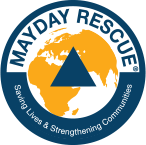
Medi Rescue Foundation logo

The Mayday Rescue Foundation was a not-for-profit foundation registered in the Netherlands specialised in training, equipping, and assisting volunteer emergency first responders in areas of conflict, instability, and natural disaster, primarily Syrian Civil War affected areas. Its mission was "saving lives, strengthening communities." It was established by James Le Mesurier, a former British Army officer, in 2014, and operated primarily in the Middle East through offices in Turkey and Jordan. Mayday Rescue was initially headquartered in Dubai, United Arab Emirates. Mayday Rescue was declared bankrupt and formally dissolved in August 2020.

== Activities ==
The Mayday Rescue website stated that its purpose was to "partner with communities that are entering, enduring, or emerging from conflict or natural disasters by providing training and equipment, advocacy and outreach, and organisational capacity building for grassroots emergency response groups at the local, regional and national levels."

Since it was established, the Mayday Rescue Foundation's primary role had been as an implementing partner for international support to Syria Civil Defence (SCD, the "White Helmets"), for whom it provided training, equipment and mentorship funded by countries including the UK, Denmark, the Netherlands and Germany; the other implementing partner delivering aid to SCD is Chemonics, which delivered a comparable amount of support to the White Helmets on behalf of USAID.

Mayday Rescue reported that between 2014 and 2018 it received funding of $127 million, $19 million of which came from non-government sources.

Mayday Rescue was a separate organisation from both SCD and The Syria Campaign, a UK-based human rights organisation which advocates for protection of civilians in the Syrian conflict. The Syria Campaign maintains an independent fundraising website, www.whitehelmets.org, which raises money to support SCD. However, Mayday Rescue and SCD headquarters shared the same building, on the same floor until about 2017, and shared meetings. Donors say it was difficult to distinguish the headquarters operation of the two organisations.

As of 2019, Mayday Rescue was assessing possibilities for Civil Defence-based stabilisation programmes in countries other than Syria, such as Iraq and Yemen.

== Fraud allegation ==
As a result of a disinformation campaign against Mayday Rescue and the White Helmets, increased scrutiny was placed on the Foundation by European governments. The Dutch Ministry of Foreign Affairs had ended its support to Mayday Rescue in 2018. An audit was requested by the UK's Department for International Development (DfID) in late 2018, which was delivered in June 2019. It recommended introducing more stringent accounting controls and tighter governance but found no serious issues.

Later in 2019, a Dutch firm, SMK Audit, were appointed by Mayday's Chief Financial Officer Johan Eleveld to audit a UK funded project (Batal 19). Eleveld did not follow the principles of good procurement practice per Annex C to Accountable Grant Agreements and insisted the audit firm must be Dutch, and sourced by him alone. SMK had no experience of auditing grant funded projects in conflict environments and failed to deliver a project audit report. In an attempt to salvage the audit failure, Eleveld, arranged for SMK to conduct an advisory visit instead which was carried out and presented in November 2019. According to Dutch newspaper de Volkskrant, the assessment uncovered false receipts after an employee admitted she and a colleague had written the wrongly dated receipts on the instructions of Le Mesurier; de Volkskrant reported that after the preliminary assessment was presented and three days before James Le Mesurier's death on 11 November 2019, he had reported the fraudulent backdating of a receipt, offering to resign from the foundation. Mayday Rescue's new administrator stated in early 2020 that the foundation would be closed down within a few months. Other criticism included that here was no supervisory board, so directors could decide their own salaries, and that the non-profit organisation had commercial branches in Turkey and Dubai. According to The Guardian, SMK "raised questions about cash withdrawals, tax positions and grant agreements, but made no formal findings", while additional allegations were made by Johan Eleveld.

In January 2020, at the request of the foundation's donors, Cornelis Vrieswijk was appointed as chair of Mayday's board of directors. According to der Volkskrant, the new administrator called salaries of senior staff "excessive", in some cases €26,000 per month, although these had been consented to by donor countries. The UK Foreign and Commonwealth Office confirmed that an independent investigation found no evidence of fraud or misuse of UK funds.

Immediately after Le Mesurier's death, a four-month forensic inquiry of Mayday Rescue's accounts by Grant Thornton was commissioned at the urging of donors; a summary report of which de Volkskrant's journalists had seen. Grant Thornton stated that "The key finding of our investigation of the flagged transactions leads us to believe that there is no evidence of misappropriation of funds... we have been able to refute the alleged irregularities. In particular, the cash withdrawals by James Le Mesurier and Emma Winberg were justified and are accounted for. The events surrounding the ‘50k Emergency Fund’ appear to be a result of a misunderstanding” and not fraud. The audit highlighted that "book keeping was sloppy" in Mayday, but admitted that in the complex war-time environment where the organization was operating these that understandable, and the leadership was able to ensure transparency and "high integrity" of its operations. The audit found the only employee who had unjustly enriched himself was the chief finance officer, Johan Eleveld, who made the original allegations against Le Mesurier; as he had "given himself a hefty raise, paid himself additional bonuses and reimbursed himself for allegedly unused vacation days which, the auditors are convinced, he actually took.". It was later discovered that Johan Eleveld had a history of bankruptcy and had "properly looted" the solar energy firm Enforsa where he was a senior manager by transferring €190,000 to a company where he was a board member, and failing to repay a loan of €10,000.

In July 2020, de Volkskrant reported that Germany was then re-claiming almost €50,000, and the Netherlands was holding back a final grant of over €57,000. (In July 2020, RedaktionsNetzwerk Deutschland reported that the German government reclaimed the money as it was unspent; the German government stated that there was no evidence of misappropriation of funds and that the 2018 and 2019 audits of the German-funded projects were still on-going.)

The chief financial officer was suspended and later fired. In a legal action brought by the new administrator against the suspended financial director, it was disclosed that in 2018 27% and in 2019 33% of donations were spent on foundation costs. In June 2020, a Dutch court ordered this employee to pay back 18,000 euros.

The newspapers Der Spiegel and De Groene Amsterdammer challenged the accuracy of der Volkskrant's reporting and questioned the sources used, and Der Spiegel reported that The Guardian and BBC had refuted its core allegations. The accusations against Le Mesurier and White Helmets were described as part of disinformation war that surrounded the war in Syria.

== Insolvency ==
Mayday Rescue was declared insolvent and formally dissolved in August 2020.
