= Raed al-Saleh =

Syrian humanitarian and government official

- رائد الصالح
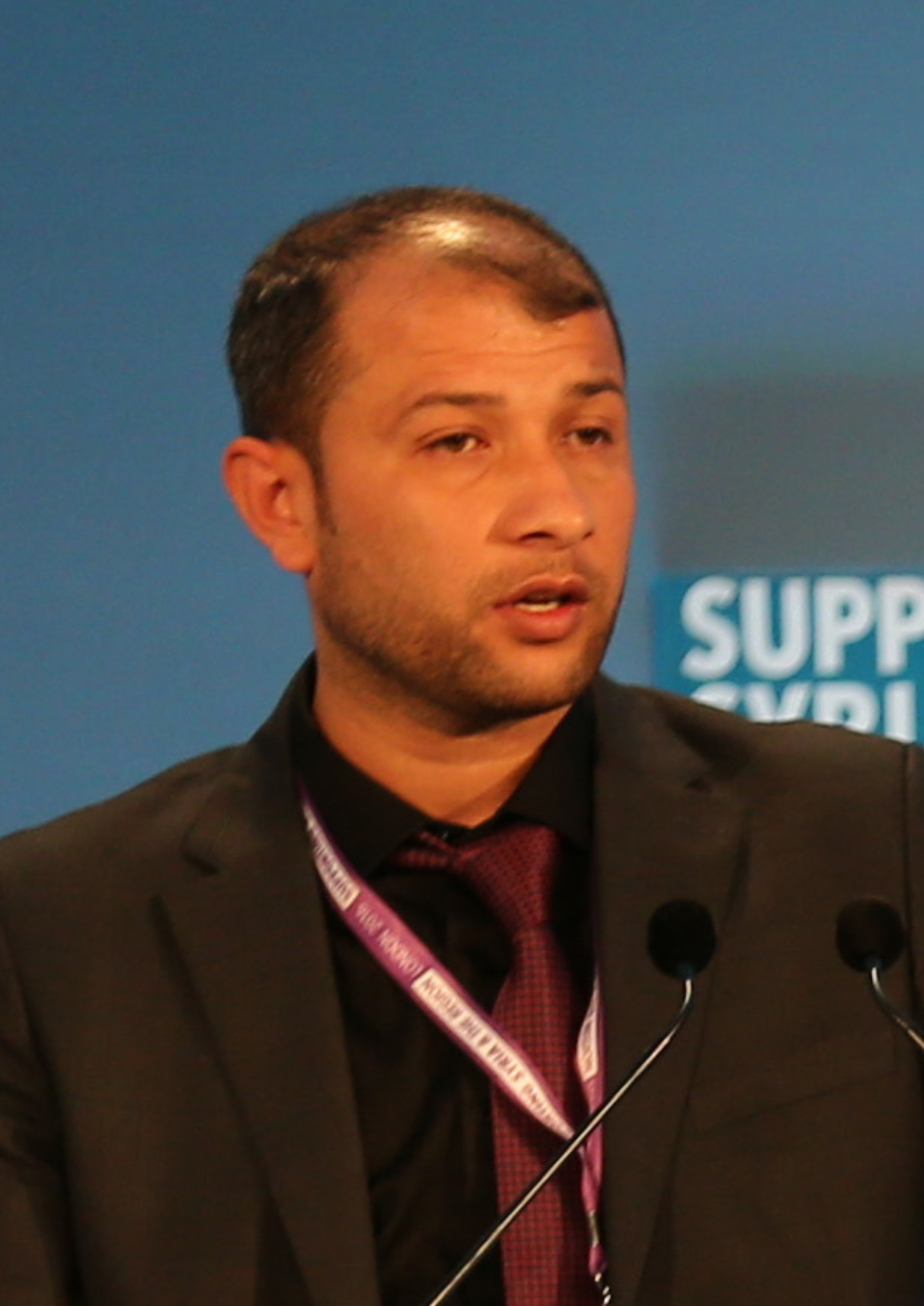
- Al-Saleh in 2016

Minister of Emergency and Disaster Management
- Incumbent
- Assumed office 29 March 2025
- President: Ahmed al-Sharaa
- Preceded by: Position established

Director of the White Helmets
- In office 2013 – 29 March 2025
- Deputy: Abdulrahman al-Mawwas
- Succeeded by: Mounir Mustafa (Acting)

Personal details
- Born: 1983 (age 42–43) Jisr ash-Shughur, Idlib, Syria

Raed al-Saleh (Arabic: رائد الصالح) is a Syrian humanitarian leader and politician who is currently serving as the Minister of Emergency and Disaster Management within the Syrian transitional government. Previously, al-Saleh was director of the White Helmets, a volunteer rescue organization operating in opposition-held areas of Syria. He was named one of Time magazine's 100 Most Influential People in 2017.

== Career ==
=== White Helmets ===
Al-Saleh has played a key role in leading the White Helmets, overseeing search and rescue operations, medical assistance, and disaster response efforts in war-torn regions of Syria. Under his leadership, the organization has been internationally recognized for its humanitarian work, receiving multiple awards, including the Right Livelihood Award and a nomination for the Nobel Peace Prize. In 2017, he was honoured as one of Time magazine's 100 Most Influential People.

On 29 March 2025, after al-Saleh's appointment as the Minister of Disaster and Emergency Management in Syria, he issued a statement announcing his resignation from the White Helmets.

=== Minister of Emergency and Disaster Management ===
al-Saleh was appointed as the Minister of Emergency and Disaster Management on 29 March 2025 by President Ahmed al-Sharaa, after the formation of the Syrian transitional government.
