= Ministry of Emergency and Disaster Management =

Government ministry of Syria

- وزارة الطوارئ والكوارث

Agency overview
- Formed: 29 March 2025; 17 months ago
- Jurisdiction: Syria
- Headquarters: Damascus
- Minister responsible: Raed al-Saleh

The Ministry of Emergency and Disaster Management (MoEaDM; Arabic: وزارة الطوارئ والكوارث, romanized: Wizārat al-Ṭawāriʾ wa-al-Kawārith) is a ministry of the government of Syria, formed on 29 March 2025.

== History ==
The ministry was established on 29 March 2025 with the formation of the Syrian transitional government.

The inaugural minister of the ministry is Raed al-Saleh, who was the director of the White Helmets, a volunteer organization that served as the civil defense force in opposition-controlled areas prior to the fall of the Assad regime. Following the regime's collapse, the group continued to fulfill its mission nationwide, and in June 2025, the organization formally dissolved itself and transferred all personnel and equipment to the authority of the Ministry of Emergency and Disaster Management.

== Tasks ==
The ministry is responsible for developing and overseeing a national system for risk and disaster management in Syria. Its tasks include improving the country’s capacity for crisis response, coordinating with local and international organizations, and implementing early warning systems and rapid response mechanisms. The ministry was created to address the need for a centralized authority capable of managing emergencies following years of successive crises across the country.

The ministry is also tasked with environmental protection. The inaugural minister, Raed al-Saleh, noted that the ministry’s responsibilities extend beyond immediate disaster response to include comprehensive, long-term planning for both natural and human-induced disasters.

== Ministers ==
No.	Portrait	Name (Birth–Death)	Term of office			Political party	Government
No.	Portrait	Name (Birth–Death)	Took office	Left office	Time in office	Political party	Government
1		Raed al-Saleh (born 1983)	29 March 2025	Incumbent	1 year, 157 days	Independent	Transitional
