= Khaled Omar Harrah =

- Born: 1985; Aleppo
- Died: 11 August 2016 (aged 30–31); Aleppo
- Occupations: Painter and decorator, later White Helmet
- Years active: 2014-2016
- Known for: Search and rescue operations in Aleppo

Khaled Omar Harrah (Arabic: خالد عمر حرح, romanized: Khālid ʻUmar Ḥarraḥ; 1985 – 11 August 2016) was a Syrian man who volunteered for the Syrian Civil Defense Force, known as the White Helmets, an organization dedicated to providing humanitarian assistance.

He was a painter and decorator when the war in Syria broke out. He rose to international fame in June 2014 after he rescued a baby trapped in a building destroyed after an air strike in Aleppo, an act which gave him the nickname "the hero of Aleppo". The rescue was caught on video and viewed around the world.

The documentary film director Feras Fayyad dedicated his 2017 documentary Last Men in Aleppo, which chronicles the search-and-rescue missions of Aleppo's White Helmets, to him.

At age 31, August 11, 2016, he was killed in an airstrike, leaving behind a wife and two daughters. In 2017 Politico listed him as one of the 28 people "shaping, shaking and stirring Europe".
