= Last Men in Aleppo =

- Film poster
- Directed by: Feras Fayyad
- Produced by: Kareem Abeed; Søren Steen Jespersen
- Cinematography: Fadi Al Halabi; Thaer Mohammed; Hassan Kattan; Mujahed Abou Al Joud
- Edited by: Michael Bauer; Steen Johannessen
- Music by: Karsten Fundal
- Distributed by: Grasshopper Film (United States)
- Release date: 3 May 2017
- Running time: 104 minutes
- Countries: Denmark; Syria
- Language: Arabic

Last Men in Aleppo (Arabic: آخر الرجال في حلب, romanized: Ākhir al-Rijāl fī Ḥalab) is a 2017 documentary film about the Syrian Civil War. Written and directed by Feras Fayyad, produced by Kareem Abeed and Søren Steen Jespersen, it documents the life in Aleppo during the war and particularly sheds light on the search-and-rescue missions of the internationally recognized White Helmets, an organization consisting of ordinary citizens who are the first to rush towards military strikes and attacks in the hope of saving lives. The documentary highlights the lives of three White Helmets founders, Khaled Omar Harrah, Subhi Alhussen and Mahmoud Alheter as they grapple the dilemma to flee their country or stay and fight for it.

The film won the World Documentary Grand Jury Prize at the 2017 Sundance Film Festival and was nominated for Best Documentary Feature at the 90th Academy Awards. The film also won Best Documentary Feature Film at the 11th Asia pacific Screen Awards in 2017. After its theatrical run, it aired on the PBS series POV.

== Synopsis ==
Government forces loyal to President Bashar al-Assad initiate the military offensive to recover the city of Aleppo from the rebels, this triggers a humanitarian crisis in the city and its surroundings. The film follows the day-to-day life of the White Helmets as they work to rescue survivors from the ruins of the city, also explores the debate between the humanitarian workers of leaving the city for good.

== Reception ==
=== Critical response ===
Last Men in Aleppo has an approval rating of 97% on review aggregator website Rotten Tomatoes, based on 35 reviews, and an average rating of 8.06/10. The website's critical consensus states, "Heartbreaking and hopeful, Last Men in Aleppo paints an urgent portrait of war-torn Syria, putting faces on an ongoing and complicated conflict". It also has a score of 80 out of 100 on Metacritic, based on 14 critics, indicating "generally favorable reviews".
