= United Nations Security Council Resolution 2165 =

United Nations Security Council Resolution adopted in 2014

UN Security Council Resolution 2165
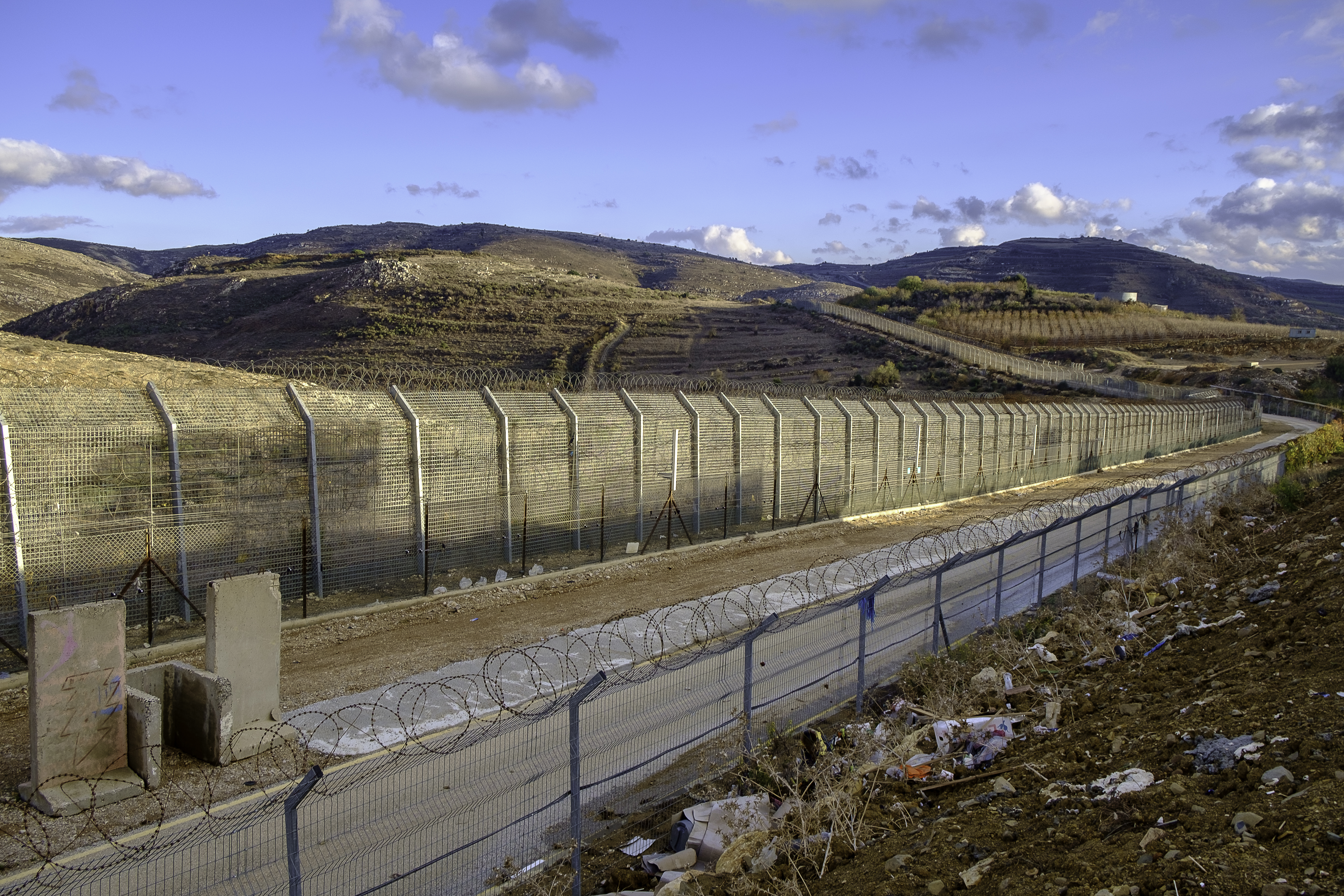
- Syria border
- Date: 14 July 2014
- Meeting no.: 7216
- Code: S/RES/2165 (Document)
- Subject: Direct humanitarian access across four border crossings not controlled by the Syrian government
- Voting summary: 15 voted for; None voted against; None abstained
- Result: Adopted

Security Council composition
- Permanent members: China; France; Russia; United Kingdom; United States
- Non-permanent members: Argentina; Australia; Chad; Chile; Jordan; South Korea; Lithuania; Luxembourg; Nigeria; Rwanda

United Nations Security Council Resolution 2165 was passed by a unanimous vote on 14 July 2014, and allows direct humanitarian access across four border crossings not controlled by the Syrian government.

It supplemented United Nations Security Council Resolution 2139 passed on February 22, 2014, which called on all parties in the Syrian Civil War to permit free access to humanitarian aid.
