= Abdulrahman al-Mawwas =

Syrian engineer

- عبد الرحمن المواس
- Born: Aleppo, Syria
- Occupation: Mechanical engineer
- Known for: Co-founder & vice president of Syrian White Helmets

Abdulrahman al-Mawwas (Arabic: عبد الرحمن المواس) is the co-founder and vice president of the Syrian Civil Defense, also known as the White Helmets.

Born in Aleppo, Syria, al-Mawwas worked as a mechanical engineer before the Syrian civil war. After witnessing the destruction and suffering caused by the conflict, he was prompted to co-found the White Helmets to provide aid to areas after attacks to minimize injuries and deaths and limit property damage. Despite having had an Oscar-winning documentary made about their efforts, the White Helmet still struggle to secure funding and resources. As such, Almawwas has pled their case to several international groups and world leaders, including Emmanuel Macron and Donald Trump. He serves as the groups spokesperson and leads donor outreach.
