= Social Tables =

- Company type: Private
- Industry: Software as a Service (SaaS), Event planning
- Founded: 2011
- Founders: Dan Berger, Matthew Tendler
- Fate: Acquired by Cvent in 2018
- Headquarters: Washington, D.C., United States
- Area served: Worldwide
- Key people: Dan Berger (CEO)
- Products: Event planning platform, 3D floor planning software
- Number of employees: 120
- Parent: Cvent

Social Tables was a global SaaS collaborative web-based event planning platform headquartered in Washington, DC. It was founded in 2011 by Dan Berger and Matthew Tendler. It claimed to “inspire face-to-face experiences by empowering those who plan and attend them,” The technology included three-dimensional floor plans where host venues and event organizers could build rooms to position items needed for the event at hand.

Social Tables at one time had 120 employees and 5,500 customers in 100 countries. Over 4.5 million events were planned inside the Social Tables event technology. Major clients included Intercontinental Hotels Group, Hyatt Hotels, and Goldman Sachs.

Social Tables was acquired by Cvent in 2018.

== History ==
Social Tables raised $8M in a Series A funding round led by Bessemer Venture Partners and Thayer Ventures, and $13MM in a Series B funding round led by QuestMark Partners.

Social Tables was acquired by Cvent for $100m on October 16, 2018.

== Recognition ==
In 2015, the company was named one of The Washington Post's “Top Places to Work”. Social Tables was recognized by Deloitte as one of the 2018 Technology Fast 500 Winners, meaning they were one of the 500 fastest growing technology companies in North America. In January 2016, Social Tables moved to a new 30,000 square foot office located in Washington, DC's Metro Center. Social Tables has dedicated 10,000 square feet of its headquarters to holding events for the DC community.
