= Amani Ballour =

Syrian pediatrician and activist

- أماني بلور
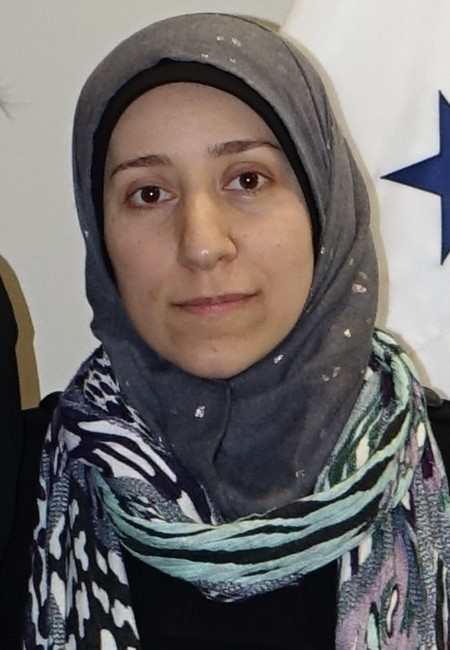
- Amani Ballour at UN (2020)
- Born: 1987 (age 38–39); Ghuta, Syria
- Education: Damascus University
- Occupation: Physician

Amani Ballour (born 1987) is a Syrian pediatrician and an advocate of women's and children's rights. Her story is portrayed in the Oscar-nominated documentary The Cave which tells of the struggles of running an underground hospital during the Syrian civil war.

== Early life and education ==
Ballour was born and grew up in the east of Ghuta, a suburb of the Syrian capital Damascus. She is the youngest among two brothers and three sisters. Her sisters married and became homemakers at a young age; the eldest was 15. Ballour, on the other hand, persisted on completing her education.

Ballour had always wanted to be an engineer, so she took up Mechanical Engineering at Damascus University despite experiencing gossip from others and receiving opposition from her family due to gender-based expectations. Her family, particularly her father, refused to support her until she eventually shifted to pediatrics. In 2012, she finished her general medical studies at the same university. She began studying pediatrics until she had to abandon this to attend to the casualties of the Syrian Civil War.

== Work in underground hospital ==
At age 24, Ballour was prompted to abandon her studies when she was summoned by neighbors to treat a 12-year-old wounded boy. The boy was a victim of the government's attempt to crush rallies. He was a bystander during the protest and was shot with a bullet in his head. The boy's family was worried that the authorities would seize them if they went to the hospital, so they came to Ballour instead. When they arrived, the boy was already dead.

Ballour started as a volunteer in a nearby hospital held by anti-government rebels in Ghouta. There were only a few doctors with not more than two full-time physicians like her. The hospital was intended to be a big, six-story medical center and was under construction during that time. The hospital operated despite frequent attacks from the government forces, until authorities seized the area. With thirteen other doctors, Ballour decided to continue operating underground, beneath the unfinished building. The subterranean clinic became eventually known as The Cave. As its popularity grew, more medical volunteers appeared and the hospital continued to work despite the siege. At times, the staff were able to use smuggled medical stocks from international and local NGOs and equipment taken from destroyed hospitals.

Ballour is no trauma surgeon, but with the influx of casualties amid the Syrian Civil War, doctors in The Cave had to treat the wounded even though their affliction was not their specialty. Ballour recalled treating victims with missing limbs and victims of chemical attacks who were suffocating in the subterranean hospital. Government forces bombed the hospital many times, and she kept detailed journals about the days and the attacks.

In 2016, at age 29, Ballour was elected to become the hospital director. She became the first and only woman to manage a hospital in Syria. She ran the hospital until the Assad regime quelled the last resistance in 2018. Since then, Ballour has been living in exile. She was forced to flee Syria and spent some time living in a refugee camp in Turkey.
