= United Nations Security Council Resolution 2139 =

UN Security Council Resolution 2139
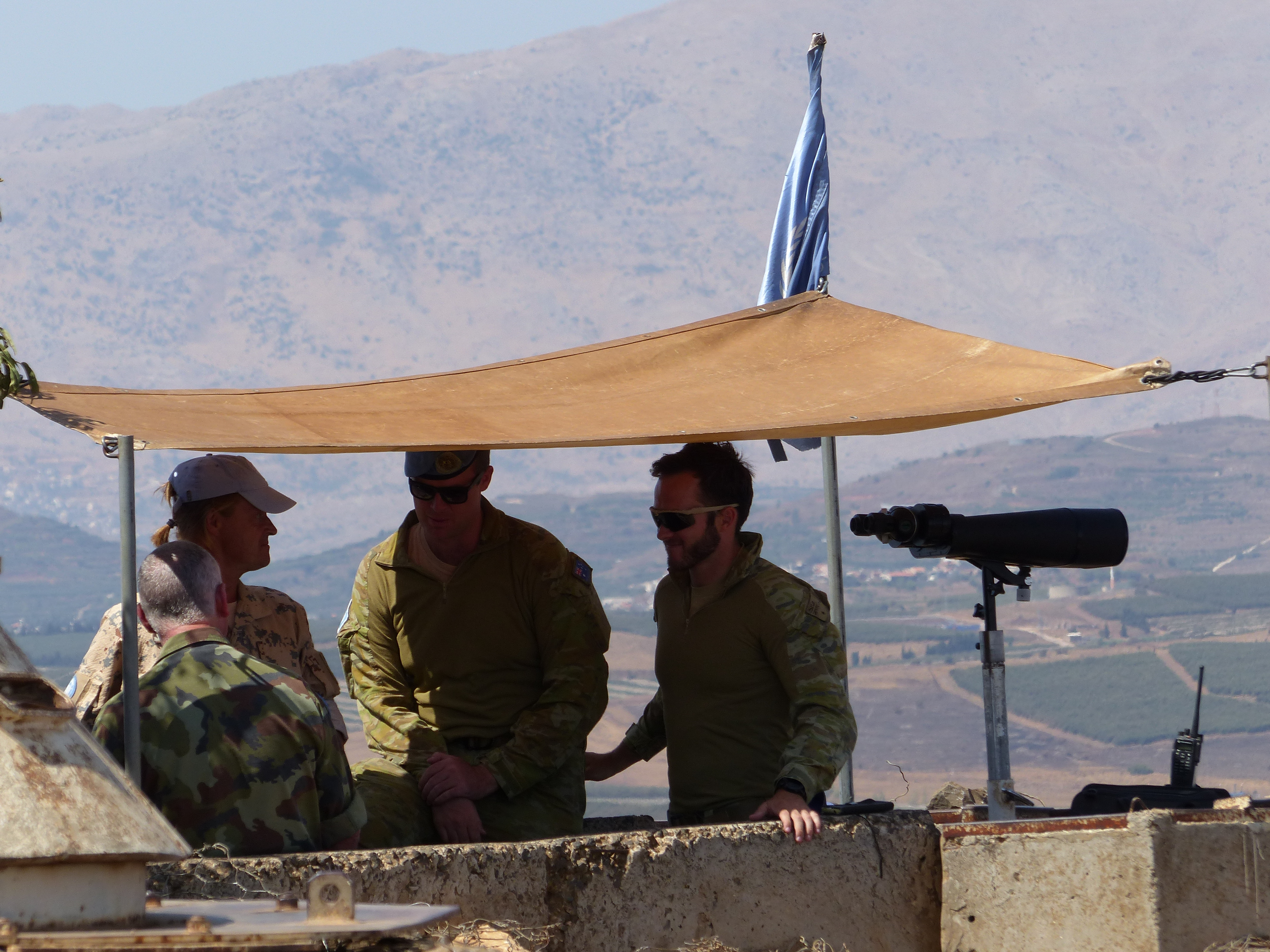
- UNDOF troops
- Date: 22 February 2014
- Meeting no.: 7116
- Code: S/RES/2139 (Document)
- Subject: Humanitarian aid access to Syria
- Voting summary: 15 voted for; None voted against; None abstained
- Result: Adopted

Security Council composition
- Permanent members: China; France; Russia; United Kingdom; United States
- Non-permanent members: Argentina; Australia; Chad; Chile; Jordan; South Korea; Lithuania; Luxembourg; Nigeria; Rwanda

United Nations Security Council Resolution 2139 was passed by a unanimous vote of the Council on February 22, 2014, and calls on all parties in the Syrian Civil War to permit free access to humanitarian aid.

On July 14, 2014, it was supplemented by United Nations Security Council Resolution 2165, allowing direct humanitarian access to four border crossings not controlled by the Syrian government.
