= White Helmets (Syria) =

Volunteer civil defense organization

- Syrian Civil Defence
- الدفاع المدني السوري

- Abbreviation: SCD
- Formation: 2014
- Founder: James Le Mesurier
- Legal status: Integrated into the Ministry of Emergency and Disaster Management (since 2025)
- Headquarters: Damascus
- Region served: Formerly, Syrian opposition-controlled areas and currently, Syrian transitional government-governed areas
- Minister of Emergency and Disaster Management: Raed al-Saleh
- Acting Director: Mounir Mustafa
- Deputy Director: Abdulrahman al-Mawwas
- Parent organization: Ministry of Emergency and Disaster Management (since 2025)
- Volunteers: 3,000 (with monthly stipend)
- Website: syriacivildefence.org

The White Helmets (Arabic: الخوذ البيضاء/القبعات البيضاء, romanized: al-Ḫawdh al-bayḍāʾ / al-Qubaʿāt al-Bayḍāʾ), officially known as the Syrian Civil Defence (SCD; الدفاع المدني السوري, ad-Difāʿ al-Madanī as-Sūrī), is a volunteer organisation that operated in Turkey and in the then-opposition-controlled parts of Syria before the fall of the Assad regime. Formed in 2014 during the Syrian civil war, the majority of the volunteers' activity in Syria consisted of medical evacuation, urban search and rescue in response to bombing, evacuation of civilians from danger areas, and essential service delivery. In April 2018, the organisation said it had saved about 114,000 lives, and that 204 of its members had lost their lives while performing their duties. They had asserted their impartiality in the Syrian conflict.

The organisation had been the target of a sustained disinformation campaign by supporters of Syrian President Bashar al-Assad and Russian state-sponsored media organisations such as RT and Sputnik; the campaign promoted false accusations connecting it with terrorist activities, among other conspiracy theories. (Note: Sample of sources reporting disinformation campaign against the White Helmets:)

In the aftermath of the Assad regime's collapse, the White Helmets played a pivotal role in the Sednaya Prison search-and-rescue efforts following its liberation by rebel forces. On 3 June they announced that they would "fully integrate" into the Syrian Ministry of Emergency and Disaster Management, and the Syrian Civil Defence continues to operate.

== History ==
The rescue teams that later became Syria Civil Defence emerged during the late 2012 escalation of the Syrian Civil War, as areas no longer under the control of the Assad government came under sustained attack from its military forces. In response, in the absence of formal governmental structures, small groups of civilian volunteers from affected communities, particularly in Aleppo and Idlib, assembled to assist civilians injured in bombardment or trapped under the rubble of destroyed buildings. Training, funding and support was provided from international partners, including donations from governments in Western Europe, the US and Japan; the Turkish AKUT Search and Rescue Association; and a combination of NGOs, private individuals, public fundraising campaigns, and charities. Primary support and training was provided by Mayday Rescue Foundation, a not-for-profit foundation established by former British Army officer James Le Mesurier, and became a key factor in the development of the organisation.

Local and provincial councils joined with Mayday Rescue Foundation and AKUT Search and Rescue Association to create the first training programmes in early 2013. ARK, an international contracting firm based in the United Arab Emirates, would facilitate entry of volunteers to Turkey, where they would be trained by AKUT. Early training courses included trauma care, command and control and crisis management. Over the next two years, the number of independent civil defence teams grew to several dozen as graduates of the early trainings such as Raed Saleh established new centers; the national organisation of SCD was founded on 25 October 2014 at a conference of independent teams.

SCD grew to be an organisation of over 3,000 volunteers operating from 111 local civil defence centres across 8 provincial directorates (Aleppo, Idlib, Latakia, Hama, Homs, Damascus, Damascus Countryside, and Daraa) in 2016. In October 2014, these self-organised teams came together and voted to form one national organisation: Syria Civil Defence. As of January 2017, the SCD claims to have rescued over 80,000 people since they began to keep count in 2014. The White Helmets themselves have become targets of Syrian and Russian airstrikes. According to The Economist, approximately one in six SCD have been killed or badly wounded, "many by 'double tap' (one after another) Russian and Syrian airstrikes on the same site as they search for bodies." Seven members were killed in August 2017 in an apparent assassination at their operations centre in the Syrian city of Sarmin in Idlib Province.

Although SCD has existed since 2013, their worldwide acknowledgement in media started in late 2014 with the help of The Syria Campaign NGO, which introduced the nickname "White Helmets."

On 14 December 2016, as the Syrian Armed Forces were recapturing eastern Aleppo, SCD head Raed Saleh requested safe passage of SCD operatives to rebel controlled countryside around Aleppo. Syria Civil Defence joined the Independent Doctors Association, the Syrian Network for Human Rights, and the Violations Documentation Center to accuse Russian forces of war crimes in eastern Aleppo, jointly submitting a report to the Independent International Commission of Inquiry on the Syrian Arab Republic.

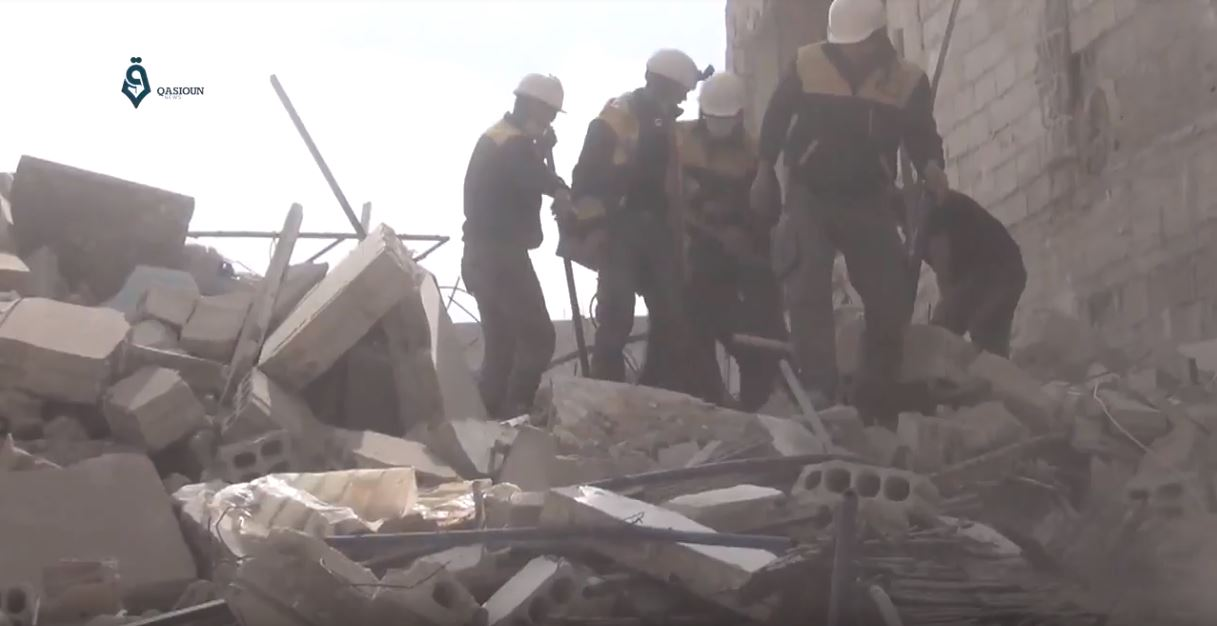
White Helmets clear rubble in Arbin, Eastern Ghouta, 6 February 2018

In May 2018, the US State Department announced that funding has been frozen for the White Helmets. A State Department official indicated that they were reviewing assistance programs in Syria overall, which included funding for the White Helmets, and at the same time indicated that the United States would continue to support the White Helmets through multilateral donations. The chairman of the White Helmets stated that the government of the United States, and other supportive institutions, promised to continue to provide critical funding to the organization.

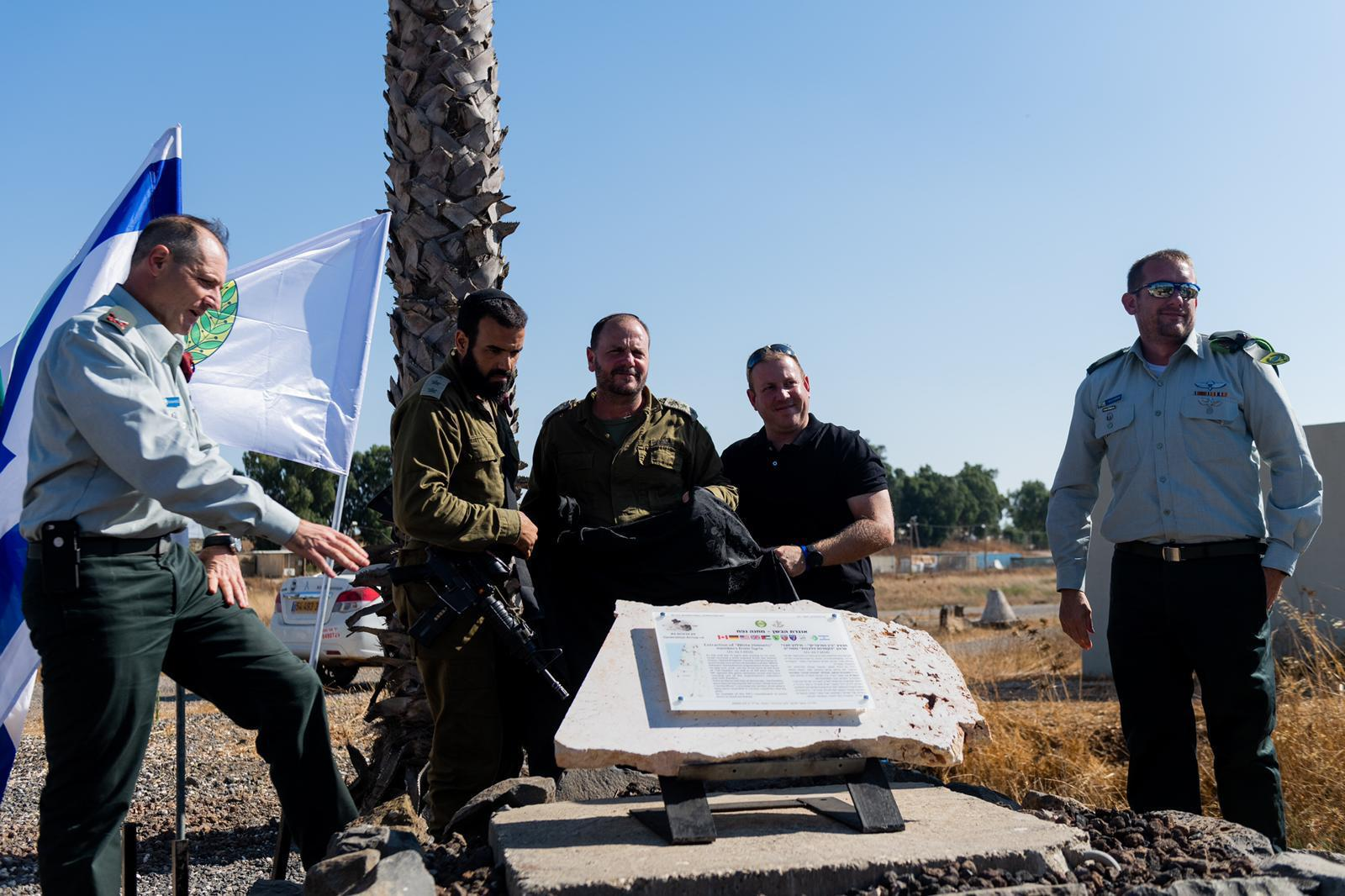
Plaque commemorating the rescue of the 98 members of the White Helmets in the "Hashan Formation" at the northern Golan Heights

On the night of 21 July 2018, Israel opened the Golan Heights boundary to allow a UN rescue mission to evacuate 422 people – 98 White Helmet volunteers and their family members – to Jordan. An international group led by Chrystia Freeland lobbied for the exit of the White Helmets, as their lives were in danger due to the Syrian government′s advancing offensive in southwestern Syria. The White Helmets reported 3,700 of their volunteers remained in Syria. A Syrian government official condemned the evacuation of White Helmets as a "criminal operation" that had revealed "the terrorist nature" of the group. President Bashar al-Assad said: "They have two choices: to lay down their arms and use the amnesty we have offered over the last four or five years, or be killed like other terrorists." In September 2018, the United Kingdom granted asylum to about 100 White Helmet staff and relatives that had been evacuated to Jordan.

The co-founder of the White Helmets, James Le Mesurier, was found dead in Istanbul on 9 November 2019.

On 3 June 2025, after the Assad regime's collapse, they announced that they would "fully integrate" into the Syrian Ministry of Emergency and Disaster Management.

== Operations ==
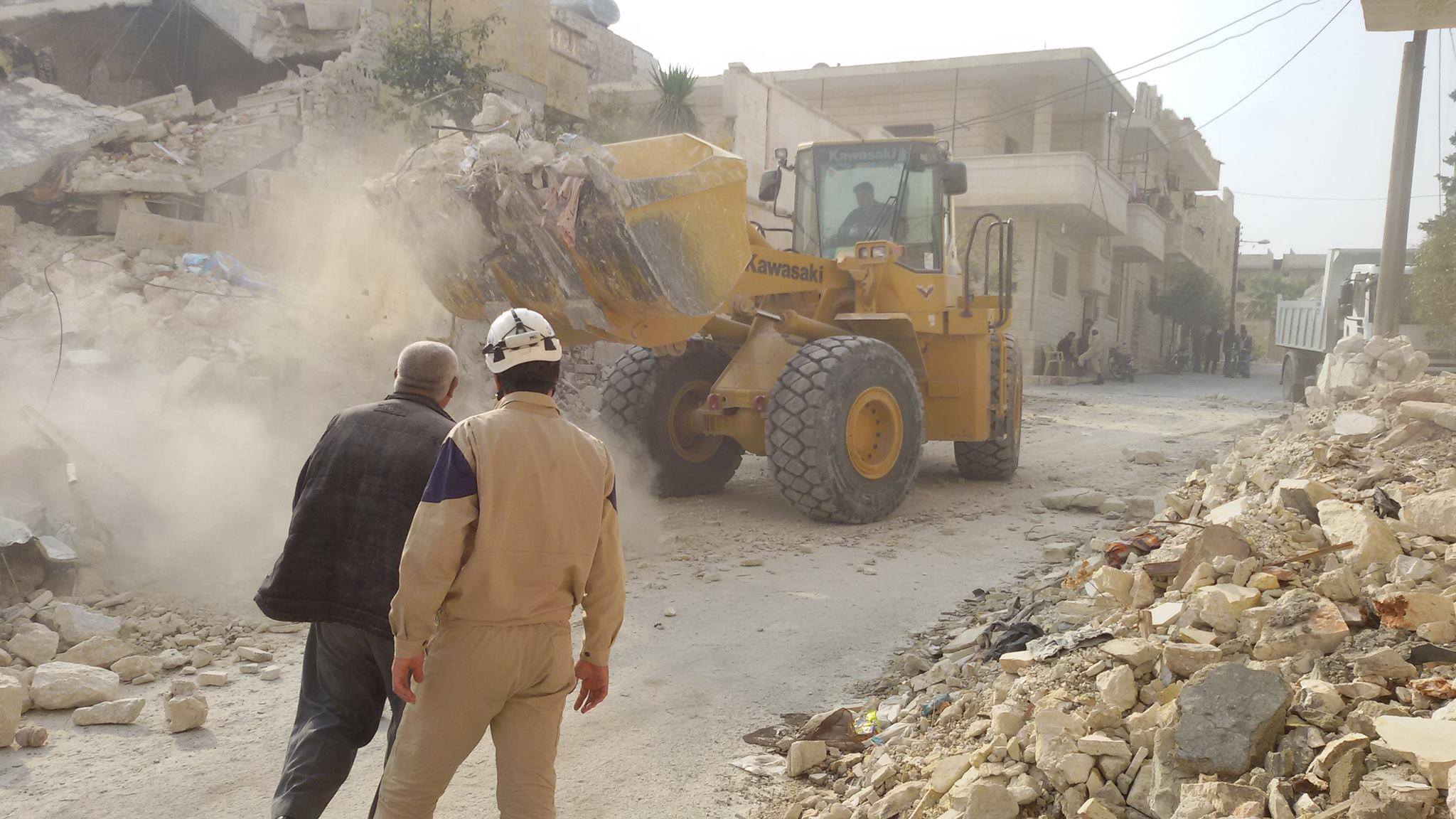
SCD clearing rubble following an attack in Maarat al-Nu'man in November 2014, using a USAID-supplied bucket loader

SCD's stated mission is "to save the greatest number of lives in the shortest possible time and to minimize further injury to people and damage to property." Their work covers the 15 civil defence tasks as laid out in international humanitarian law (IHL); the bulk of their activity in Syria consists of urban search and rescue in response to bombing, medical evacuation, evacuation of civilians from danger areas, and essential service delivery.

The most prominent role of SCD was rescuing civilians from airstrikes with barrel bombs, improvised explosive devices dropped by SAAF helicopters. Following a request from Bashar al-Assad for support, Russia intervened in the Syrian Civil War on 30 September 2015. Much of the work of SCD has been in response to aerial bombardments by the Russian Air Force attack aircraft.

As well as providing rescue services, SCD undertakes repair works such as securing damaged buildings and reconnecting electrical and water services, clearing roads, teaching children about hazards from unexploded ordnance, as well as firefighting and winter storm relief. Sometimes described as the most dangerous job in the world, SCD operations involve risk from being active in a war-zone. By late 2016, 159 White Helmets had been killed since the organisation's inception.

SCD is not affiliated with the International Civil Defence Organisation (ICDO), nor is it connected to the Damascus's Syrian Civil Defence Forces (SCDF), an ICDO-member since 1972. But, since the SCDF operate in government-held areas and since civilian casualties in Syria overwhelmingly result from government forces' bombardments against targets in opposition-held areas, the unaffiliated SCD engages in civil defence tasks in said rebel-held areas.

In 2015, the SCD unsuccessfully lobbied the European Union (EU) and governments to impose a no fly zone over certain parts of Syria to protect civilians from airstrikes. The White Helmets have unsuccessfully called upon governments such as France to act to effect a ceasefire and protect lives in subsequent years.

As of 2015, SCD had an annual budget of $30 million provided by a mix of state donors and public fundraising. Volunteers who worked full-time received a $150 monthly stipend, a figure set by donors. In July 2019, this was raised to $250.

It has a co-ordination office on the Turkish-Syrian border in Gaziantep and a training centre in Turkey.

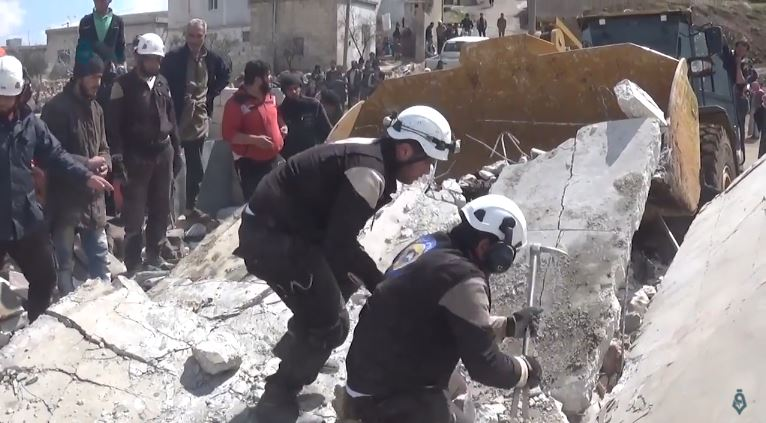
White Helmets of the Syrian Civil Defense in Kafr Oweid, a village south of Idlib, 21 March 2017

At the height of its operations, it had 4,000 volunteers in 200 teams. As of April 2017, there were about 3,000 White Helmet members, about 100 of which were women. As of March 2018, a British government programme review recorded that stipends were being paid for 4,011 volunteers in 179 centres to provide search and rescue and other services, and that 114,507 civilians had been reported rescued or aided. In June 2018 the British government decided, due to the changing military situation, to responsibly withdraw from funding other projects in the area that the White Helmets operated in, such as policing, education and livelihood support, while maintaining support for the White Helmets. In October 2018, the Jordanian Foreign Ministry announced that at least 300 White Helmets members who had fled Syria into Jordan are now resettled in several Western countries, including Canada and the United Kingdom.

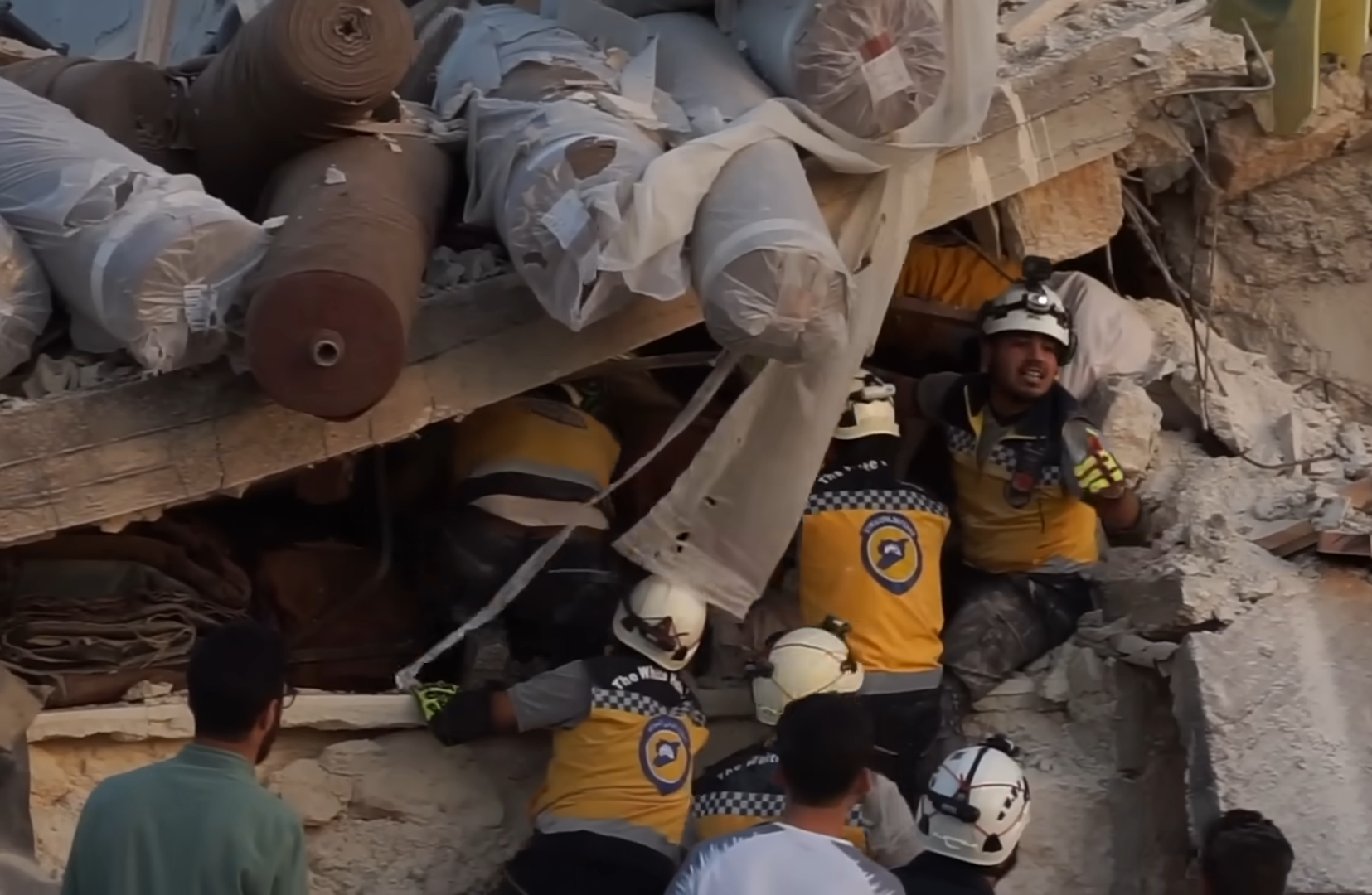
SDC personnel search for survivors amidst the rubble, 8 December 2024

During the fall of Damascus, rebel forces captured Sednaya Prison on 8 December 2024. The White Helmets took part in search-and-rescue operations there, helping to release prisoners held within and searched the prison complex for detainees potentially held in secret cells or basements. Their search efforts concluded on 9 December, determining that no hidden or sealed areas that could contain detainees were left.

In July 2025, the White Helmets made rescue operations during the Wildfires in the Syrian coast.

In June 2026, the Syrian Ministry of Emergency and Disaster Management sent a 15-member search-and-rescue team from the Syrian Civil Defence after the 2026 Venezuela earthquakes. The operation was carried out with the support of the Qatari International Search and Rescue Group of the Internal Security Force.

== Partnerships and funding ==
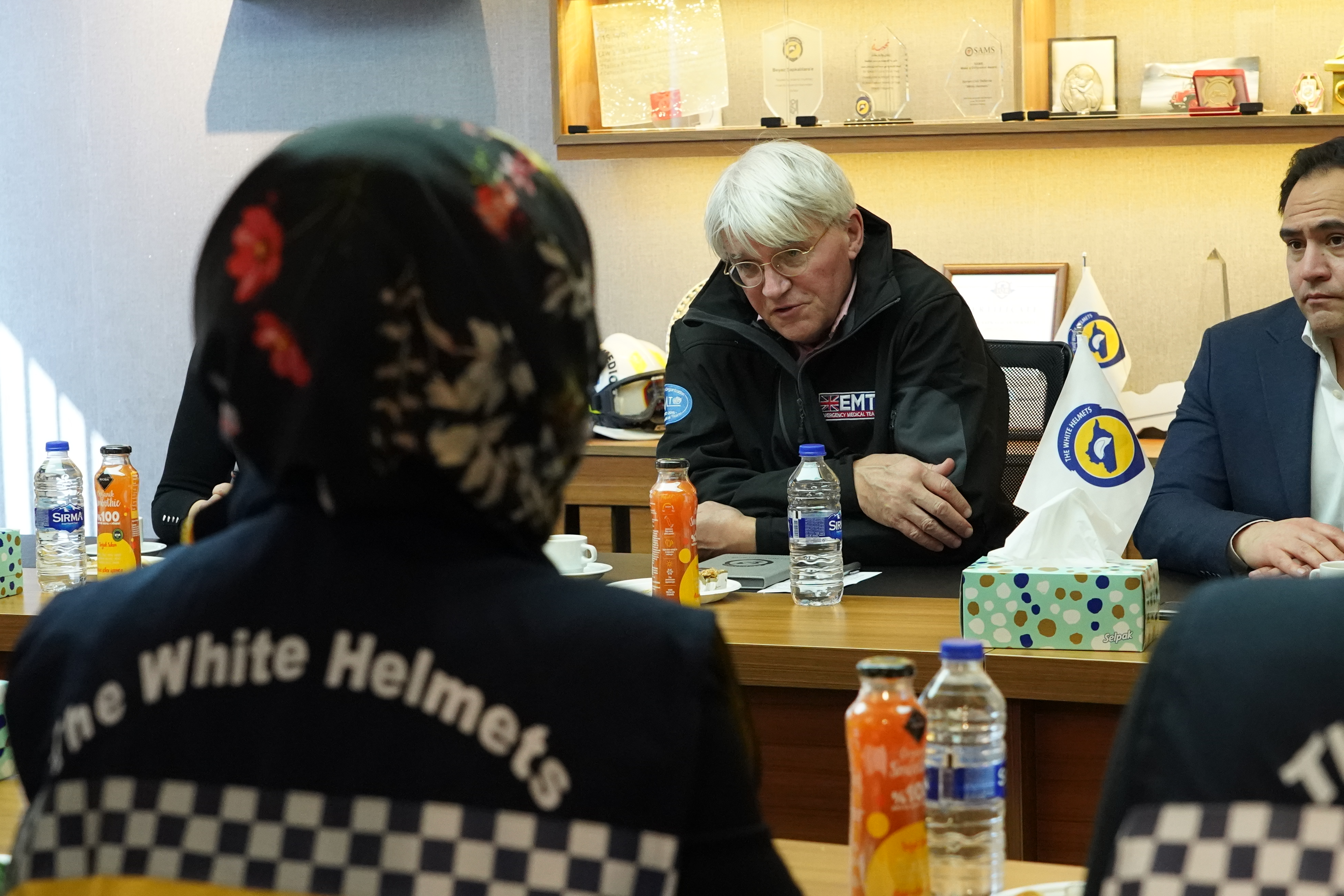
Minister of State for International Development, Andrew Mitchell, meets members of the White Helmets to discuss the impact of the 6 February earthquake in Syria

SCD is officially an impartial humanitarian NGO, with no affiliation to any political or military actor and a commitment to render services to anyone in need. Like all NGOs operating in opposition-controlled areas, SCD negotiates humanitarian access with organisations such as local councils, provincial councils, and armed groups, with relationships varying widely from governorate to governorate.

Prior to 2020, SCD worked in close partnership with the Netherlands-based NGO Mayday Rescue Foundation. Mayday Rescue's Program Manager for Syria was Farouq Habib, who has also been described as the White Helmets' Head of International Relations.

The White Helmets has received extensive funding from the United States, the United Kingdom, and other western governments. Initially the United Kingdom Foreign and Commonwealth Office was the largest single source of funding through Mayday Rescue Foundation. U.S. government funds were directed to SCD through Chemonics, a U.S. based private international development company. Funders have included the Canadian government Peace and Stabilization Operations Program, the Danish government, the German government, the Japan International Cooperation Agency, the Netherlands Ministry of Foreign Affairs. the New Zealand Ministry of Foreign Affairs, the United States Agency for International Development (USAID) and the United Kingdom Conflict, Stability and Security Fund (CSSF). USAID contributed at least $23 million from 2013 to March 2016. The British government provided £15 million of funding between 2012 and November 2015, increased to £32 million by October 2016. As of 31 March 2018, the British government had provided £38.4m in aid to the White Helmets. The SCD has also received individual donations online to their Hero Fund, which provides treatment for wounded volunteers and supports their families.

In March 2017, the organization was reported to be operating on an annual budget of about $26 million. Mayday Rescue reports that between 2014 and 2018 the White Helmets received funding of $127 million, $19 million of which came from non-government sources; it is not clear if this included U.S. government funding which went through Chemonics rather than Mayday Rescue. In 2018, the White Helmets' vice president reported that the group’s financing for 2018 from foreign governments had fallen to $12 million from $18 million the previous year.

In April 2018, the Trump administration suspended the funding of the White Helmets as part of a wider suspension of the funding of stabilization projects in Syria while the U.S. reassesses its role in Syria. The U.S. had provided more than $33 million to support the group since 2013. On 14 June 2018, the Trump administration authorised USAID and the United States Department of State to release approximately $6.6 million in aid to be shared between the group and the UN's International, Impartial and Independent Mechanism in Syria.

The Netherlands announced that it would end its funding of several aid projects in opposition strongholds in Syria, including the White Helmets, by December 2018. This announcement followed a Ministry of Foreign Affairs report according to which the supervision over the activity of White Helmets is inadequate and there is a risk that funds meant for the rescue workers would end up in the hands of armed groups instead.

A number of accusations against White Helmets and Le Mesurier, especially regarding alleged fraud and lavish lifestyle, were dismissed in May 2020 by forensic audit experts from Grant Thornton, which came to a conclusion that "the key finding of our investigation of the flagged transactions leads us to believe that there is no evidence of misappropriation of funds. For the most part we have been able to refute the alleged irregularities." The audit highlighted that "book keeping was sloppy" in Mayday, but admitted that in the complex war-time environment where the organization was operating these that understandable, and the leadership was able to ensure transparency and "high integrity" of its operations.

Mayday went into administration in July 2020 and the White Helmets' finances were subsequently managed by Chemonics, a for-profit organisation that charges considerably more for their services than Mayday Rescue did.

== Publicity and recognition ==
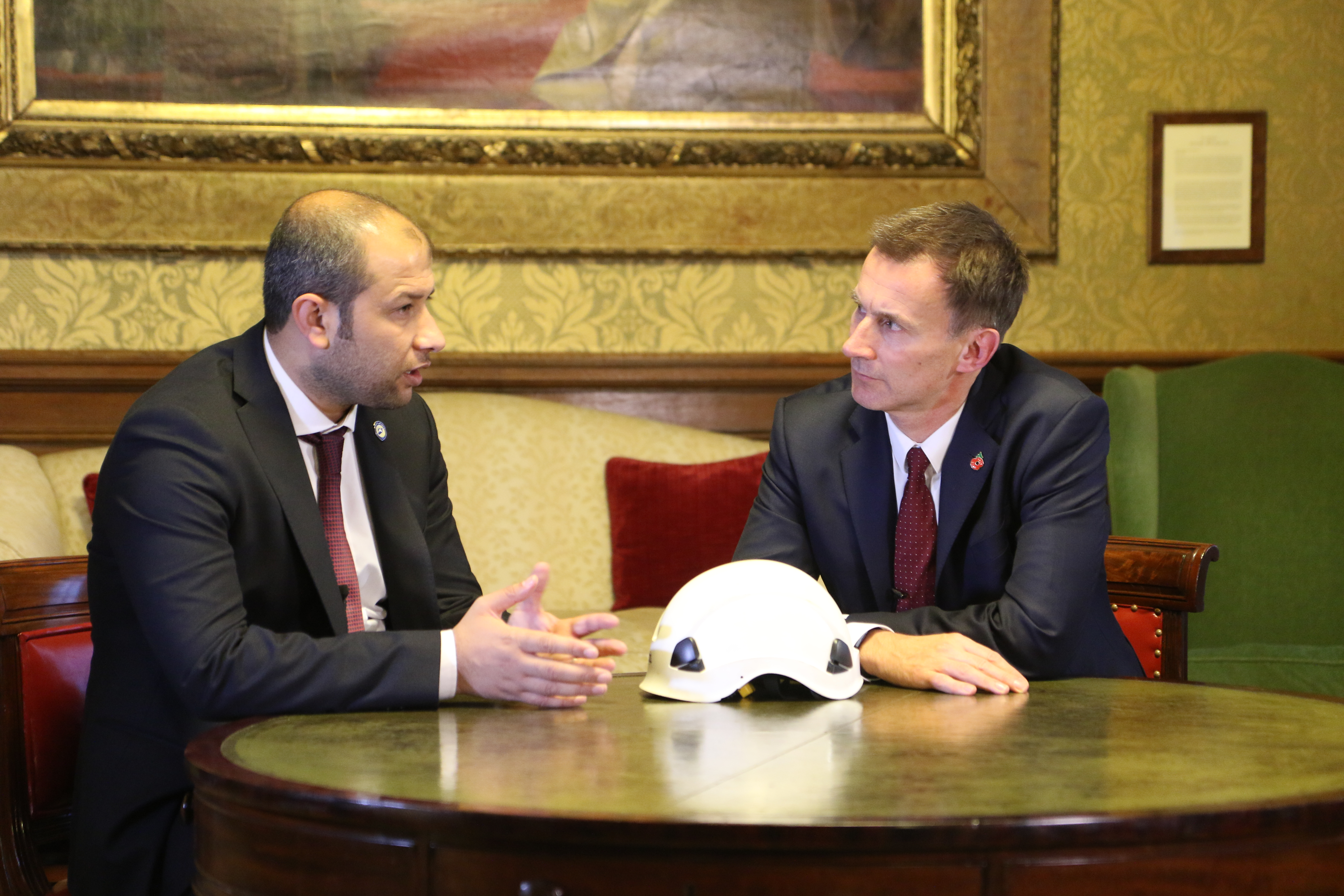
Raed al-Saleh (left), SCD Director, meets with UK Foreign Secretary Jeremy Hunt in 2018

SCD is widely cited, quoted, or depicted in regional and international media coverage of the conflict in Syria. Raed al-Saleh, the Director of the SCD, has been an outspoken advocate against bombardment of civilians, addressing the United Nations Security Council and other international bodies on a number of occasions.

SCD has been the subject of two films. The streaming service Netflix released a documentary film entitled The White Helmets on 16 September 2016 by British director Orlando von Einsiedel and producer Joanna Natasegara. The film won the Best Documentary (Short Subject) at the 89th Academy Awards. SCD head Raed Saleh was unable to attend the Oscars ceremony due to escalation of the conflict, despite having a valid visa. Khaled Khateeb, cinematographer of the film, was unable to attend due to a visa problem. The Associated Press reported that the United States Department of Homeland Security under President Trump decided to block Khaled Khateeb at the 11th hour. Released in 2017, Last Men in Aleppo was directed by Syrian director Feras Fayyad in collaboration with Danish film-maker Steven Johannessen and the Aleppo Media Centre; it was the Winner of the Grand Jury Documentary prize at the Sundance Film Festival in 2017.

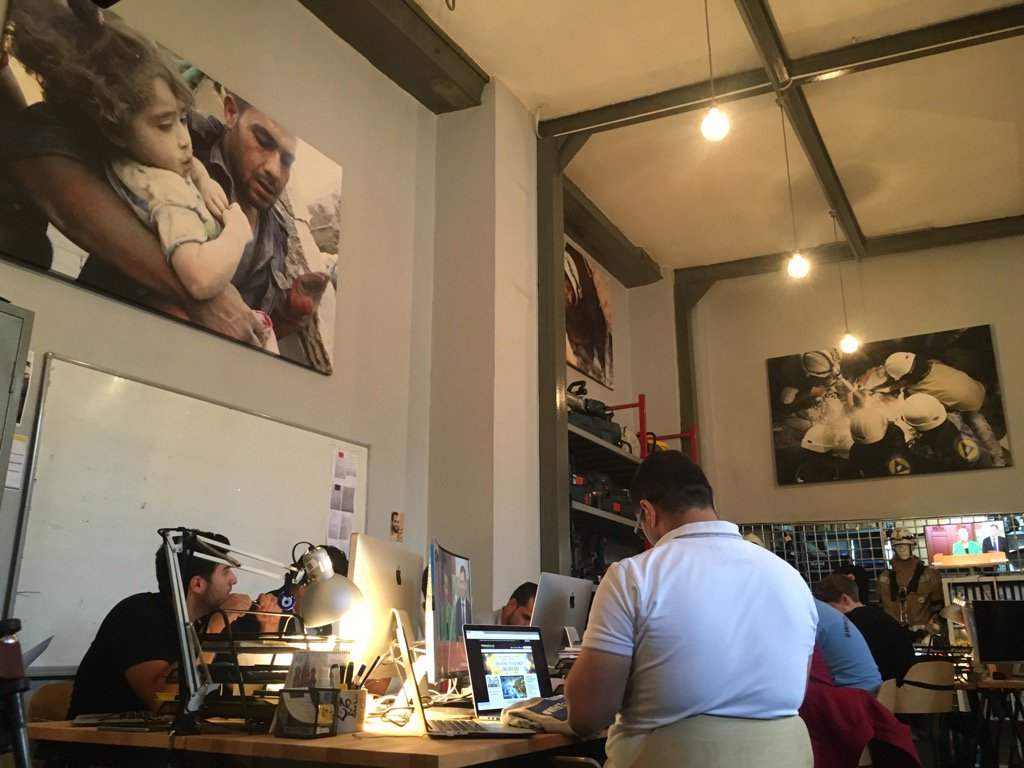
Members of the White Helmets watch Nobel Prize ceremony from their Headquarters, 7 October 2017

SCD was nominated for the 2016 Nobel Peace Prize and was a recipient of the 2016 Right Livelihood Award, the "Alternative Nobel Prize".

In 2017, it was awarded the McCall-Pierpaoli Humanitarian Award by Refugees International and its women volunteers were awarded the Theirworld Hope award by Sarah Brown's children's charity Theirworld. Female SCD volunteer Manal Abazeed, who accepted these awards, was listed by Fortune magazine as being among the "World's Most Powerful Women" of 2017.

In 2017, Politico listed Khaled Omar Harrah, a leading member in Aleppo, known as the 'child rescuer', as one of the 28 people "shaping, shaking and stirring Europe". He was killed in Aleppo in an airstrike in August 2016. Harrah is the main character in Last Men in Aleppo, which was dedicated to him after his death.

Another prominent member is Mohammed Abu Kifah, a civil defence team member who rescued another child from beneath the rubble in Idlib. Following his death in an apparent assassination on 12 August 2017, aged 25 years old, Kifah's life was commemorated on BBC Radio 4's Last Word.

== Controversies ==
=== Information warfare campaign ===
According to investigative journalists and analysts, SCD became a target of a systematic information warfare campaign by the Russian government, the Syrian government, alt-right personalities, and their supporters, who have accused the organisation of taking sides in the Syrian Civil War, carrying arms, and supporting terrorist groups. The Russian-funded RT television network and Sputnik news agency have made controversial claims about SCD, and multiple sources have found issues with the veracity and credibility of the claims. In an interview with Reuters, Facebook claimed that a hacking group based out of Syria targeted the White Helmets.

Olivia Solon from The Guardian speculated that SCD was targeted because they document their activities with handheld and helmet cameras. This footage often shows the aftermath of airstrikes, and has been used by human rights groups such as Amnesty International and the Syria Justice and Accountability Centre.

According to The New York Times, Bashar al-Assad's claim that the White Helmets are "Al-Qaeda members" was "without evidence". Assertions made by RT contributor Eva Bartlett that the White Helmets stage rescues and "recycle" children in its videos were reported by Snopes and Channel 4 News as being false "beyond a reasonable doubt". In December 2017, The Guardian newspaper commented that it had "uncovered how this counter-narrative is propagated online by a network of anti-imperialist activists, conspiracy theorists and trolls with the support of the Russian government ... [which] ... attract an enormous online audience, amplified by high-profile alt-right personalities, appearances on Russian state TV and an army of Twitter bots." A study by Tom Wilson and Kate Starbird, published in The Harvard Kennedy School Misinformation Review in January 2020, found that anti–White Helmet discourse dominated postings on Twitter.

=== Relationship with SDF ===
The White Helmets have a hostile relationship with the majority-Kurdish Syrian Democratic Forces (SDF). The group operated in Afrin until the local Kurdish administration banned it in December 2015. It returned following the capture of the city by the Turkish Army and Syrian rebels in the Turkish-led Operation Olive Branch in 2018. In June 2019, after fires set to crop fields by the Islamic State of Iraq and the Levant threatened the food supply of Syrians living in SDF-controlled areas, the White Helmets offered to enter SDF territory and help fight the fires, but permission was denied. Nicholas A. Heras, a Fellow at the Center for a New American Security, stated that the White Helmets as an organization referred to Turkey’s operation in Afrin as the "liberation" of Afrin, and maintained that there was "credible evidence" that the White Helmets assisted Turkish soldiers and rebels by providing de-mining assistance. The White Helmets denied that they supported the Turkish campaign.

=== Other ===
In November 2016, the Revolutionaries of Syria Media Office, an opposition media organisation, published a video showing two SCD volunteers performing a staged rescue operation for the Mannequin Challenge meme. The White Helmets apologised for their volunteers' error of judgement and said it had not shared the recording on their official channels.

In June 2017, a member of the White Helmets was suspended indefinitely after he was discovered to have assisted armed militants in the burial of mutilated corpses of soldiers belonging to pro-government forces.

Footage showing White Helmets members removing a man's body following his execution by rebel militants has caused critics to accuse the group of "assisting" in executions. The leader of the White Helmets has remarked that these are "isolated incidents" and are not representative of the leadership of the organisation.

In 2018, Anglican vicar Andrew Ashdown, along with Church of England and House of Lords figures such as Lord Carey of Clifton and Michael Nazir-Ali, visited Syria and met with Assad; Ashdown accused the White Helmets of being militants, and accused the group of "keeping an injured Syrian child untreated and covered in dust and blood" for propaganda purposes. A UK Foreign Office memorandum criticized the trip, warning that it would be exploited for propaganda purposes by Assad.

Following the end of the Syrian civil war, one of the biggest issues the White Helmets has encountered is landmines. According to sources, at least 144 people, including 27 children, have been killed by landmines and unexploded remnants of war since Bashar al-Assad's regime fell in early December.
