= Syrian Civil Defence Forces =

- Dissolved: 8 December 2024
- Purpose: Civil defence
- Region served: Syria
- Official languages: Syrian Arabic
- Volunteers: 50,000

The Syrian Civil Defence Forces was a civil defence organisation that operates in Syria. Directors-General of the organisation have included Brigadier General Abdel-Chani Jamal. The forces are divided into units or squads.

The Syrian Civil Defence Forces have been part of the ICDO (International Civil Defence Organisation) from 1972 onward, when there were around 50,000 volunteers.

They are not connected to, and should not be confused with, the White Helmets / Syria Civil Defence (SCD).
