= Paul McKeigue =

Academic

Paul McKeigue is a professor of genetic epidemiology and statistical genetics at the University of Edinburgh, a post he assumed in 2007. He is a signatory to the Great Barrington Declaration. Earlier in his career, he was a professor at the London School of Hygiene & Tropical Medicine and University College Dublin.

McKeigue is a prominent member of the Working Group on Syria, Propaganda and Media (SPM). The SPM has gained attention and criticism for disputing the veracity of the use of chemical weapons in the Syrian Civil War. The first publication of the SPM, titled Doubts about "Novichoks", questioned whether Russia's secret nerve agent programme ever existed. McKeigue has allegedly been involved with ties to Russian and Syrian governments and promoting a Douma chemical attack false flag theory.

== Working Group on Syria, Propaganda and Media ==
McKeigue is a member of the Working Group on Syria, Propaganda and Media (SPM). The SPM states that the group was established to "facilitate research into the areas of organised persuasive communication (including propaganda and information operations) and media coverage, with respect to the 2011-present conflict in Syria including related topics". The first publication of the SPM, titled Doubts about "Novichoks", questioned whether Russia's secret nerve agent programme ever existed.

Other members of the SPM include political scientist Tim Hayward, blogger Vanessa Beeley, former academic Piers Robinson, lecturer in International Relations Tara McCormack, and sociologist David Miller.

=== Douma chemical attack ===
The SPM wrote that the 2018 Douma chemical attack was staged by the White Helmets civil defence organisation. The SPM published a paper, co-authored by McKeigue, in which a number of alternative theories about the attack in Douma were outlined. One SPM theory was that the White Helmets organisation had constructed gas chambers to kill citizens as part of an elaborate false flag scheme to lay blame for the deaths on the Syrian government. McKeigue had, “borrowed the gas chamber idea from a retired American pharmacologist, Denis O'Brien, who described in a self-published paper how it had come to him in a dream after he had eaten an anchovy pizza”.

=== Russian covert intelligence ===
In March 2021, the BBC and The Times reported that McKeigue had been passing information about employees of the NGO Commission for International Justice and Accountability (CIJA) to a person he thought to be a Russian intelligence operative. McKeigue had an extended email correspondence with the person, who claimed to be based in Brussels and who went by the name "Ivan." In addition to voluntarily providing "Ivan" with information about CIJA's staff members, McKeigue wrote about the location of CIJA's archives in which the organisation preserves evidence of war crimes committed by the Russian and Syrian governments in the Syrian Civil War. McKeigue also urged "Ivan" to investigate Western journalists.

The purported Russian agent's emails had in fact been written by members of CIJA as part of a sting operation targeting McKeigue and the SPM. CIJA sought to expose the organisation's and its members' support of the Syrian and Russian governments through the creation of a fake Russian intelligence agent. McKeigue subsequently stated that he had apologised to those involved, and denied any wrongdoing or illegal activities.

=== Russian OPCW diplomat ===
In April 2021, The Daily Beast reported that McKeigue and the SPM had direct contacts with Russian foreign ministry officials in four separate Russian embassies and that they were working in concert to support Syrian president Bashar al-Assad. During his communication with "Ivan," a person he believed to be a Russian intelligence operative, McKeigue indicated that WikiLeaks had put him in touch with Melinda Taylor, a lawyer connected with Julian Assange, to conduct 'lawfare' (meaning frivolous or harassing litigation) against the Organisation for the Prohibition of Chemical Weapons (OPCW). McKeigue said that he had worked with Stepan Ankeev of the Russian embassy in London to this end.
