= Piers Robinson =

British academic (born 1970)

- Born: Piers Gregory Robinson; 1970 (age 55–56)
- Occupations: Academic; Lecturer; Writer; Author
- Title: Co-Director
- Board member of: Organisation for Propaganda Studies

Academic background
- Education: University of Bristol
- Thesis: The News Media and Intervention (2000)
- Influences: Edward S. Herman, Noam Chomsky

Academic work
- Discipline: Propaganda studies, political science, political journalism
- Institutions: University of Liverpool; University of Manchester; University of Chester; University of Sheffield
- Notable ideas: CNN effect
- Website: piersrobinson.wordpress.com

Piers Gregory Robinson (born 1970) is a British academic researcher in the field of media studies. He is also a co-director of the Organisation for Propaganda Studies and a founder of the Working Group on Syria, Propaganda and Media (SPM). He has authored a number of publications on the CNN effect. He has attracted controversy and criticism for disputing the Ba'athist Syrian government's responsibility for the use of chemical weapons in the Syrian Civil War.

== Education and career ==
Robinson received his PhD from the University of Bristol in 2000, with a thesis titled The News Media and Intervention. He was a lecturer in political communication at the University of Liverpool from 1999 to 2005 and senior lecturer in international politics at The University of Manchester from 2005 to 2015. He was the chair in Politics, Society and Political Journalism at The University of Sheffield until he left his post in 2019 citing "professional goals and personal circumstances". According to the Huffington Post, in 2018 Robinson "wrote a glowing review of a book titled '9/11 Unmasked' by David Ray Griffin, a leading figure in the so-called 9/11 truther movement".

== Political research ==
=== Media and propaganda ===
Robinson has argued that Western news media and their respective governments act in concert, especially in the area of foreign affairs. He puts this down to "overreliance on government officials as news sources, economic constraints, the imperatives of big business and good old-fashioned patriotism". He has said western governments frequently manipulate the media through "deception involving exaggeration, omission and misdirection". As evidence of government use of propaganda he cited Tony Blair's suggestion that the "war on terror" would require a "dedicated tightly knit propaganda unit". In "The Propaganda Model: Still Relevant Today" he examined the propaganda model put forward by Herman and Chomsky and concluded that it is still useful in describing how the corporate media works.

In an opinion piece in The Guardian, Robinson described the UK government's use of the Research, Information and Communications Unit to covertly support grassroots Muslim organisations as an example of black propaganda.

Robinson is an editor of Propaganda in Focus, a website that describes itself as "a forum for expert opinion and analysis about propaganda and its consequences". He co-edits the website with Daniel Broudy, a professor of rhetoric and applied linguistics at Okinawa Christian University. Broudy also writes for the International Journal of Vaccine Theory, Practice, and Research, an anti-vaccine journal.

==== CNN effect ====
Robinson has studied the CNN effect, a term that refers to the "influence that televised images and news coverage exercise on foreign policy decisions, especially during military interventions and humanitarian crises." In his 2002 book, The CNN Effect: The Myth of News, Foreign Policy and Intervention, he argued that "sympathetic news coverage at key moments in foreign crises can influence the response of Western governments." In Robinson's framework, which focused on "the type of media coverage a crisis attracts and on level of policy certainty within the establishment in relation to the crisis", a strong CNN effect requires two conditions: 1) media coverage that is highly critical of national policy, while simultaneously emphatically reporting on civilians and refugees, and 2) policy makers in a state of indecision with no clear policy regarding use of force. In terms of this framework, Robinson characterised the 1994 NATO intervention in Bosnia that followed the siege of Goražde as exemplifying a strong CNN effect. If either condition is missing, influence on policy makers' attitudes is likely to be weak.

=== 9/11 ===
Robinson's review of 9/11 Unmasked by David Ray Griffin (an adherent of the 9/11 truth movement) said it represents "a serious challenge for mainstream academics and journalists to start to ask substantial questions about 9/11". When asked whether he agreed with the conclusions of the book, Robinson stated "My position, as has been the case for some time, is that [conclusions detailed in 9/11 Unmasked] demonstrate beyond reasonable doubt that significant parts of the official narrative are very likely to be incorrect" and "It is no longer tenable for academics and journalists to avoid asking probing questions about the possible involvement of state actors in the 9/11 attacks. 9/11 requires further analysis and investigation and this is a position I share with many other academics."

=== 2003 invasion of Iraq ===
Robinson has paid particular attention to the role of the US and UK governments in manipulating intelligence prior to the 2003 invasion of Iraq to increase the perceived threat posed by Iraq. Robinson conducted a study of UK media coverage which concluded that most UK mainstream media reinforced official views rather than challenged them.

=== Syrian Civil War ===
Robinson and other members of the SPM working group including Vanessa Beeley, Tim Hayward and David Miller have gained considerable attention for disputing the use of chemical weapons in the Syrian Civil War, most notably in the Douma incident, alleging a coverup by the Organisation for the Prohibition of Chemical Weapons, and extremist links of the White Helmets. This has led to members of the group being described as "apologists for Assad" in articles in The Times, which compared them to Holocaust deniers.

In a consultation with HuffPost UK, Lebanese American Emerson College academic Yasser Munif criticised Robinson's stances on Syria, arguing that it "completely denies the agency of the Arab population, perceives anything happening in the region as a form of conspiracy... [Robinson] thinks Arabs have to be manipulated and funded and told exactly what to do – it’s completely insulting."

=== Russia ===
Robinson has argued that there is no persuasive evidence to implicate the Russian government in the poisoning of Sergei Skripal and says Russia has been blamed to distract from the West's "aggressive regime change strategy" in the Middle East. He said that there is no persuasive evidence showing Russia conducted any significant propaganda campaign to influence the 2016 US presidential election.

=== British politics ===
Robinson said that accusations of anti-semitism inside the UK Labour Party during Jeremy Corbyn's leadership of the party had been exaggerated for political purposes.

== Selected publications ==
- Robinson, Piers (2002). The CNN Effect: The Myth of News, Foreign Policy and Intervention. Routledge. ISBN 978-1-13-451314-7.
- Robinson, Piers; Goddard, Peter; Parry, Katy; Murray, Craig (2010). Pockets of resistance: British news media, war and theory in the 2003 invasion of Iraq. Oxford University Press. ISBN 978-1-84-779472-7.
- Robinson, Piers; Philip Seib; Romy Frohlich, eds. (2017). Routledge Handbook of Media, Conflict and Security. Routledge. ISBN 978-0-41-571291-0.
