= International Journal of Vaccine Theory, Practice, and Research =

Anti-vaccine journal

- Discipline: Anti-vaccine activism
- Language: English
- Edited by: John Oller

Publication details
- History: 2020–present
- Open access: Yes
- License: CC 4.0 NC ND

Standard abbreviations
- ISO 4: Int. J. Vaccine Theory Pract. Res.

Indexing
- ISSN: 2766-5852
- OCLC no.: 1231559321

Links
- Journal homepage; Online access; Online archive

The International Journal of Vaccine Theory, Practice, and Research is an anti-vaccine journal. It is known for promoting misinformation about COVID-19 vaccines.

== Editors and authors ==
The editor-in-chief is John Oller, a former linguistics professor at the University of Louisiana at Lafayette who published a book falsely linking vaccines to autism in 2009. Its senior editor, Christopher Shaw, is a professor at the University of British Columbia's Ophthalmology and Visual Sciences department who has promoted scare stories about vaccines. Its associate editors are Russell Blaylock, a former neurosurgeon who has baselessly claimed that wearing face masks helps SARS-CoV-2 enter the brain, and anti-vaccine activists Stephanie Seneff and Brian Hooker. Hooker and associate editor Mary Holland are also members of the anti-vaccine group Children's Health Defense.

Matti Sällberg (Karolinska Institute) said of the journal: "The editorial board is a joke. None of the editors or associate editors are scientists of a good reputation. Some even are not in the scope of the title of the journal."

Four of the journal's authors have also written for Propaganda in Focus, a website describing itself as "a forum for expert opinion and analysis about propaganda and its consequences". One such author is Daniel Broudy, a professor of rhetoric and applied linguistics at Okinawa Christian University who also co-edits Propaganda in Focus with Piers Robinson, a former professor who has promoted 9/11 conspiracy theories and disputed the use of chemical weapons in the Syrian civil war.

== Anti-vaccine publications ==
In May 2021, Seneff published a paper with co-author Greg Nigh (a naturopath) titled "Worse Than the Disease? Reviewing Some Possible Unintended Consequences of the mRNA Vaccines Against COVID-19" in the then-brand new journal.

In October 2023, the journal published a paper baselessly implying that Pfizer had knowingly avoided reporting deaths that happened during clinical trials of its COVID-19 vaccine. The paper was cited as a source by The Epoch Times, a far-right newspaper known for promoting anti-vaccine misinformation.

In September 2024, James Lawler (University of Nebraska Medical Center) said the journal is "not a real journal". He described a paper published in the journal claiming that COVID-19 vaccines contain nanobots as "a case study on how to spot disinformation", and said its content was "scientific gibberish with no basis in actual biology or the scientific method" and "relatively amateurish gibberish... that a reasonable person with a high-school level biology education should be able to easily debunk."
