= News presenter =

Person who presents news during a news program

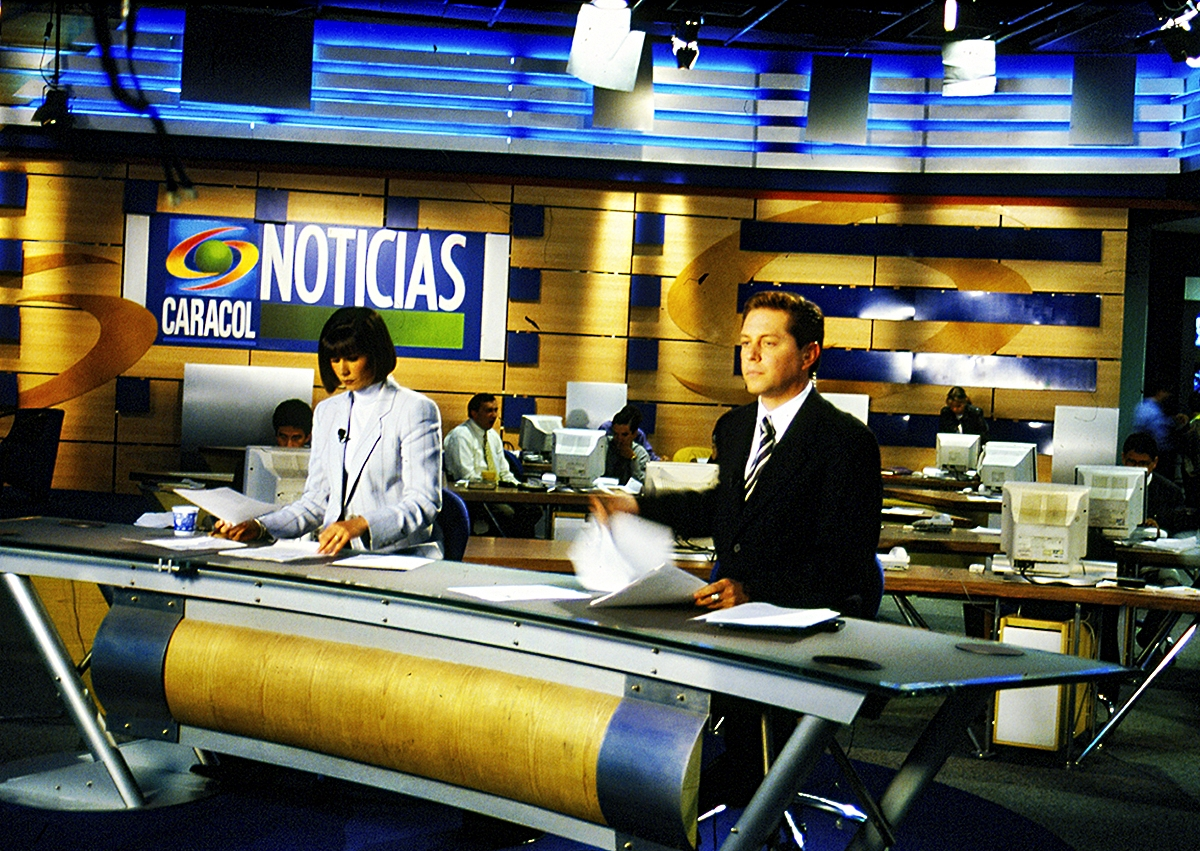
Presenters of Colombian news program Noticieros de Colombia

A news presenter – also known as a newsreader, newscaster (short for "news broadcaster"), anchorman or anchorwoman, news anchor or simply an anchor – is a person who presents news during a news program on TV, radio or the Internet. They may also be a working journalist, assisting in the collection of news material and may, in addition, provide commentary during the program. News presenters most often work from a television studio or radio studio, but may also present the news from remote locations in the field related to a particular major news event.

== History ==
The role of the news presenter developed over time. Classically, the presenter would read the news from news "copy" which they may or may not have helped write with a news writer. This was often taken almost directly from wire services and then rewritten. Prior to the television era, radio-news broadcasts often mixed news with opinion and each presenter strove for a distinctive style. These presenters were referred to as commentators.

With the development of the 24-hour news cycle and dedicated cable news television channels, the role of the anchor evolved. Anchors would still present material prepared for a news program, but they also interviewed experts about various aspects of breaking news stories, and themselves provided improvised commentary, all under the supervision of the lead (or main) producer, who coordinated the broadcast by communicating with the anchor through an earphone. Many anchors help write or edit news for their programs, although modern news formats often distinguish between anchor and commentator in an attempt to establish the "character" of a news anchor. The mix of "straight" news and commentary varies depending on the type of program and the skills and knowledge of the particular anchor.

The last major figure to present commentary in a television news broadcast format in the United States was Paul Harvey, and Mark Austin in the United Kingdom.

== Origin of the term anchor ==
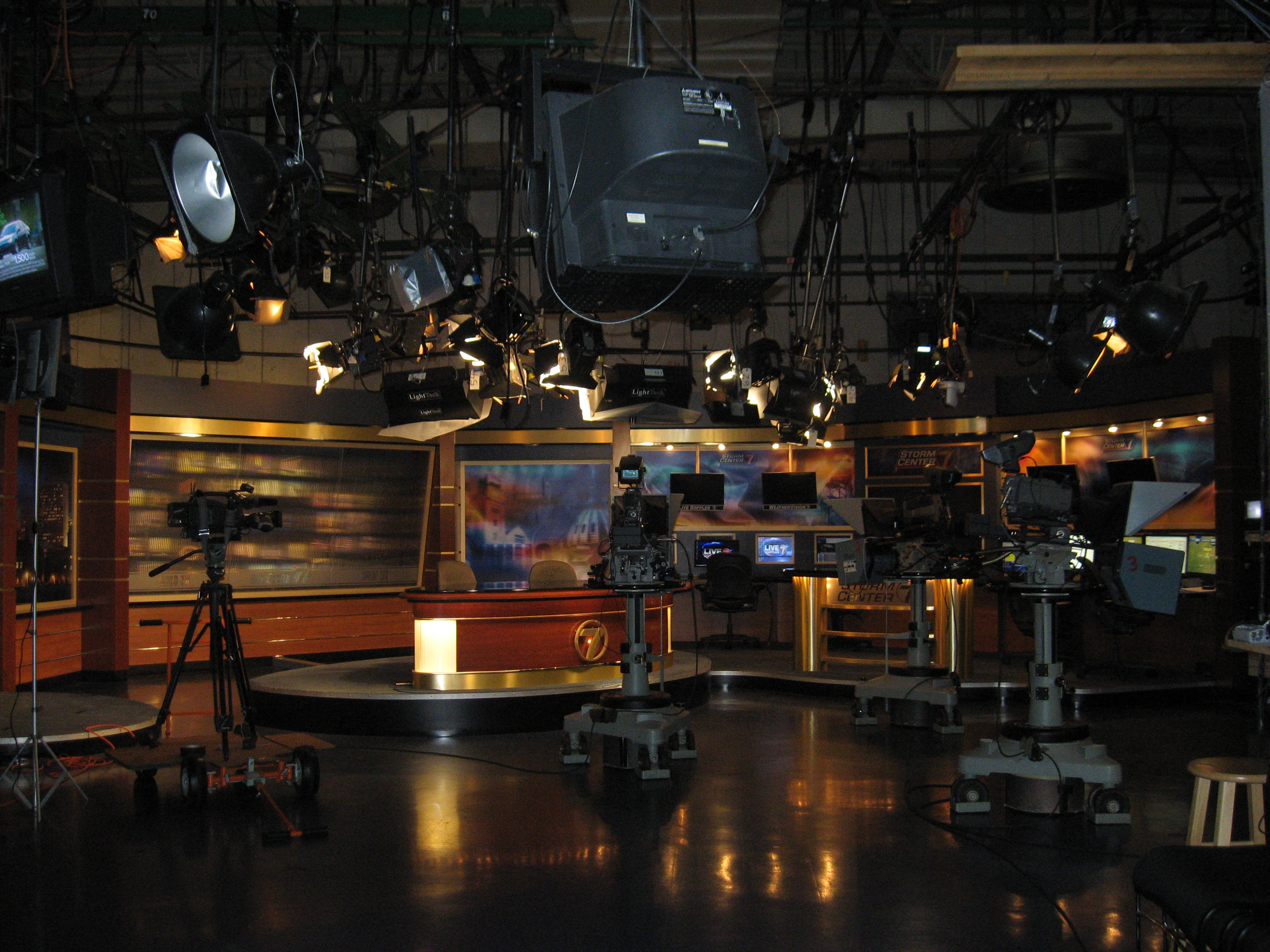
News set for WHIO-TV in Dayton, Ohio. News anchors often report from sets such as this, located in or near the newsroom.

The terms anchor, anchorman, or anchorwoman are derived from the usage common in relay racing, specifically the anchor leg, where the position is typically given to the fastest or most experienced competitor on a team. In 1948, "anchor man" was used in the game show Who Said That? to refer to John Cameron Swayze, who was a permanent panel member of the show, in what may be the first usage of this term on television. The anchor term then became commonly used by 1952 to describe the most prominent member of a panel of reporters or experts. The term "anchorman" also was used to describe Walter Cronkite's role at the Democratic and Republican National Conventions, where he coordinated switches between news points and reporters.

The widespread claim that news anchors were called "cronkiters" in Swedish has been debunked by linguist Ben Zimmer.

== Criticisms ==
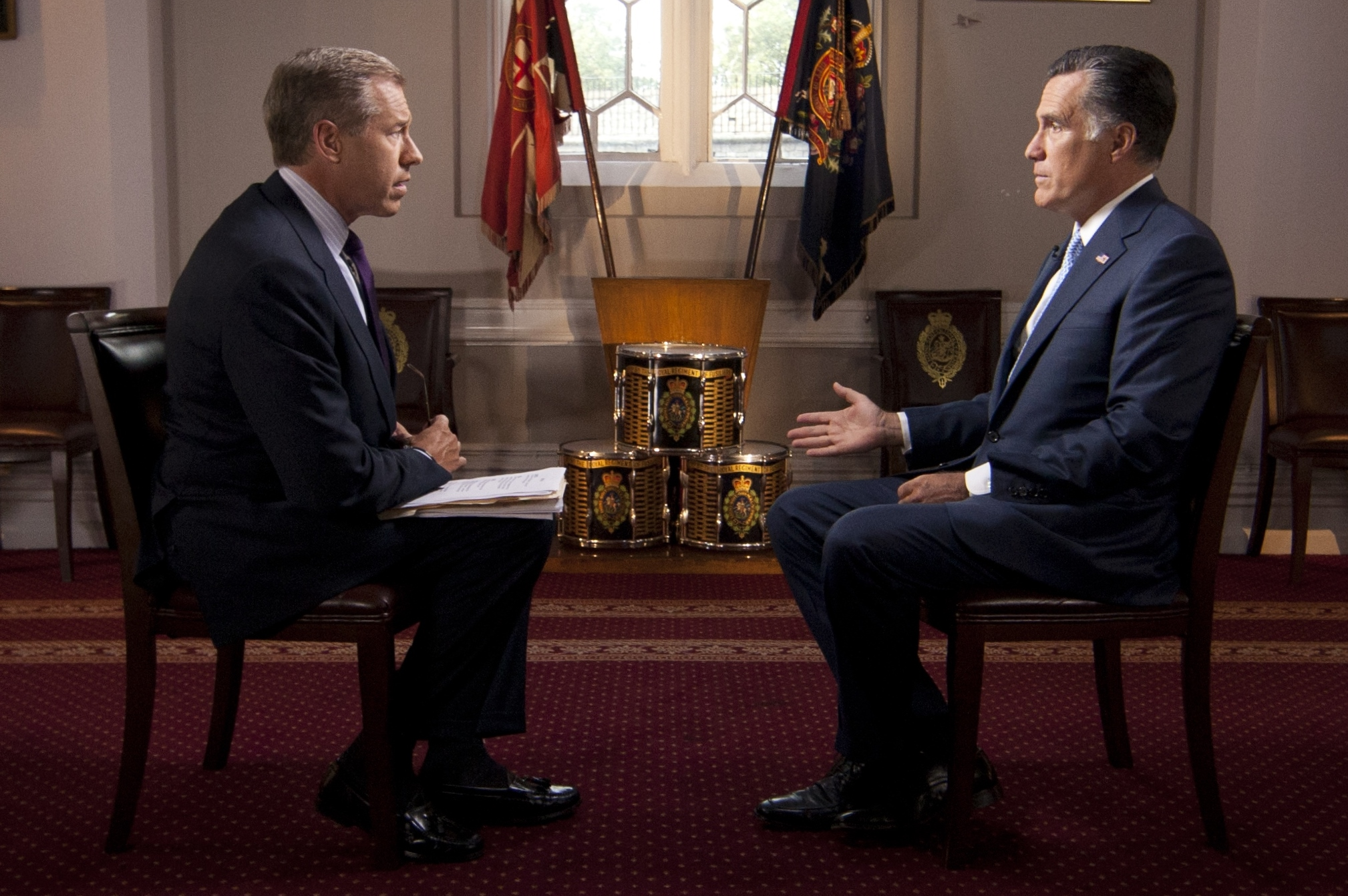
Brian Williams interviews Mitt Romney on July 25, 2012, during Romney's presidential campaign.

Anchors occupy a contestable role in news broadcasts. Some argue anchors have become sensationalized characters whose identities overshadow the news itself, while others cite anchors as necessary figureheads of "wisdom and truth" in the news broadcast. The role of the anchor has changed in recent years following the advent of satirical journalism and citizen journalism, both of which relocate the interpretation of truth outside traditional professional journalism, but the place anchormen and anchorwomen hold in American media remains consistent. "Just about every single major news anchor since the dawn of the medium after World War II has been aligned with show business," says Frank Rich, writer-at-large for New York magazine, in a polemic against commoditized news reporting, "reading headlines to a camera in an appealing way is incentivized over actual reporting".

Brian Williams, a former anchor for NBC Nightly News, evidences this lapse in credibility generated by the celebration of the role of the anchor. In early 2015, Williams apologized to his viewers for fabricating stories of his experiences on the scene of major news events, an indiscretion resulting in a loss of 700,000 viewers for NBC Nightly News. David Folkenflik of NPR asserted that the scandal "corrodes trust in the anchor, in NBC and in the greater profession", exhibiting the way in which the credibility of the anchor extends beyond their literal place behind the news desk and into the expectation of the news medium at large. CBS's long-running nighttime news broadcast 60 Minutes displays this purported superfluousness of anchors, insofar as it has no central figurehead in favor of many correspondents with similarly important roles. Up-and-coming news networks like Vice magazine's documentary-style reporting also eschew traditional news broadcast formatting in this way, suggesting an emphasis on on-site reporting and deemphasizing the importance of the solitary anchor in the news medium. In her essay, "News as Performance", Margaret Morse posits this connection between anchor persona newsroom as an interconnected identity fusing many aspects of the newsroom dynamic:

For the anchor represents not merely the news per se, or a particular network or corporate conglomerate that owns the network, or television as an institution, or the public interest; rather, he represents the complex nexus of all of them. In this way, the network anchor position is a "symbolic representation of the institutional order as an integrated totality" (Berger and Luckmann 1967, p. 76), an institutional role on par with that of the president or of a Supreme Court justice, although the role originates in corporate practices rather than political or judicial processes. [...]

Despite the anchor's construction of a commodified, aestheticized version of the news, some critics defend the role of the anchor in society, claiming that they function as a necessary conduit of credibility. The news anchor's position as an omnipotent arbiter of information results from their place behind a typically elevated desk, wherefrom they interact with reporters through a screen-within-screen spatial setup. A criticism levied against the role of anchor stems from this dynamic, insofar as anchors simply "... regurgitat[e] or reproduc[e] the report of others...", differentiating them from the productive occupations of journalists and on-site reporters. However, journalism professor Elly Alboim articulates the pro-anchor position by characterizing the anchor's nightly presence as a necessary way to build familiarity and trust between the network and its viewers: "People tend to want to believe and trust in television news and start, really, from the anchor". Beneficial or not, the anchor fits snugly into the "personality cult" engendered within American society that encourages celebrity that demands a hierarchy of authority, evidenced by the negligible change in ratings following implementation of new anchors in broadcast lineups. The identity of a particular anchor seems to influence viewer perception less than the presence of an anchor in general.

The role of the anchor correlates with the analogous, authority- and information-bearing positions already well-established in American politics, and the benefits it confers upon the political realm elucidate the compatibility between these two systems of information. Once again, Morse outlines this relationship between the anchor and the larger context in which they operate: "[s]ince there are few other organs for inclusive and substantial discourse on social and cultural values in American life, the responsibility for interpreting the world and posing a political course of action and a social agenda falls on a very limited number of public personas, including such news personalities and the president". She levies a criticism against the anchor in this case, claiming that by decreasing the number of people responsible for delivering the news, American viewers receive a bottlenecked stream of information about their surroundings. The choreography and performativity involved in the construction of the news broadcast dramatizes political processes, but in doing so, exposes its flattening of subjectivity and insistence upon itself as the final word of truth. More specifically, "the news media may do 'an important social good when using the techniques of dramaturgy to make governance more interesting to people than would be the case otherwise.' At the same time, however, 'there is an important difference between drama and democracy, with the former requiring spectators and the latter participants.'"

In contrast to perceptions of the news as a one-sided relationship with its viewers, some believe that the news works in conjunction with its audience to produce the most efficient picture possible of the world. Tom Brokaw, in speaking about his experiences as a news anchor for NBC, explained how news stories for the length of their duration tend to feed off viewers' demands, and that news is inherently a "populist medium", and that "[p]eople are not going to turn to television networks for a historically accurate and detailed description of what happened."

== See also ==
- List of news presenters
- 24-hour news cycle
- Broadcast journalism
- CNN effect
- Electronic journalism
- Electronic news-gathering (ENG)
- Journalism
- Local news
- Media event
- News broadcasting
- News program
- Sports commentator
