= Al Jazeera effect =

Term in political science and media studies

The Al Jazeera effect (Note: Also referred to as the "Al Jazeera moment", "Al Jazeera Era") is a term used in political science and media studies to describe the impact of new media and media sources on global politics. The term was coined by Philip Seib in his 2008 book "The Al Jazeera Effect". The primary example is the effect's namesake—the impact of Al Jazeera on the politics of the Arab world, which played a historic role in transforming the region's media. Seib argues that the rise of emerging media has weakened governments’ ability to control flow of information. The Al Jazeera effect can be seen as a parallel to the CNN effect.

The media can be tools of conflict and instruments of peace; they can make traditional borders irrelevant and unify peoples scattered across the globe. This phenomenon— the Al Jazeera effect—is reshaping the world. — Philip M. Seib, The Al Jazeera Effect

== Origin and use ==
William Lafi Youmans attributes the first use of the term to Philip Seib. However, Simon Henderson, who in turn attributes the term to "diplomats in the region", had used it as early as 2000. As used by Henderson, the Al Jazeera effect originally referred to Arab Middle East governments’ losing their monopoly on information because of the popularity and easy access to the Al Jazeera's satellite television network, and scholars still often use it in such a limited context. Thomas L. McPhail used it to refer to the changes in all of the Arab media. Seib generalized it to other, Internet-powered new media worldwide.

The most visible of these suppliers is Al Jazeera, which is both a prototype for the new breed of news organizations appearing around the world and a player in global politics. — Philip M. Seib, The Al Jazeera Effect

== Founding of Al Jazeera ==
Al Jazeera was created in 1996 with the combination of the Emir of Qatar's money and talent from the defunct BBC Arabic service. Audiences and journalists alike were drawn to Al Jazeera’s goal of reporting news without government censorship. From the beginning, Al Jazeera became the most watched and the most powerful news network in the region. The period from 1996 to 2004 is often referred to as the "Al Jazeera Era" because of its significance in Middle Eastern politics. Al Jazeera's motto is "The Opinion and the Other Opinion", with the goal of covering multiple perspectives from all sides. Al Jazeera English was launched in 2006. Al Jazeera has described its editorial mission as giving a "voice to the voiceless" referring to a focus on reporting stories involving marginalized or underrepresented communities.

== Impact ==
Al Jazeera played a historic role in transforming media in the Middle East and globally by ending the one-way flow of information from the West and by giving Arab citizens a platform and an effective means to respond to Western media. Al Jazeera is often called the CNN of the Arab world, and scholars argue that the launch of Al Jazeera Arabic and Al Jazeera English helped challenge the dominance of Western international news networks. Al Jazeera's news programming with live, comprehensive coverage also challenged the controlled coverage typical of state media news outlets in the Middle East. It is a trusted source of news in the Arab and Muslim world.

The Al Jazeera effect follows a similar pattern to the CNN effect which includes the accelerant effect, impediment effect, and agenda-setting effect. Seib noted that the Al Jazeera effect can be seen as parallel to the CNN effect, which states that coverage of international events can force otherwise uninvolved governments to take action. Whereas the CNN effect is used in the context of mainstream, traditional media networks such as CNN, the Al Jazeera effect generalizes this to newer media such as citizen journalist blogs, internet radio, and satellite broadcasting. He also argues that new media strengthen the identity of and give voice to previously marginalized groups, which previously lacked their own media outlets; he cites the Kurdish people as an example. Many of the new media organizations are affiliated with such groups, social movements or similar organizations. New media weaken the monopoly of many states on information, as even extensive Internet censorship in countries such as China is not wholly effective. He concludes that the new media, while not beyond being abused, are largely contributing to democratization and political reform worldwide. William Lafi Youmans notes that Seib's prediction that the Al Jazeera effect will lead to changes in the politics of the Middle East was realized in the early 2010s during the Arab Spring, with new media provoking widespread debate and unrest within the region. The CNN effect and the Al Jazeera effect have had a tremendous impact on government policy. Both have influenced U.S. foreign policy. The existence of such news organizations is crucial for democratization, freedom of expression and political action.

Al Jazeera was not the first Arab satellite channel, but it did provide new standards and production values in Arab news media. Additionally, Al Jazeera created a voting system in which viewers could vote online, formulating a type of democracy via satellite system. This has been a useful tool in measuring public opinion, especially on controversial topics, in the Arab world. As a result of Al Jazeera's programs, individuals in the Middle East have learned more about Western democracy and politics than from other previous sources.

Egyptian dissident Saad al-Din Ibrahim spoke of Al Jazeera as giving Arab citizens open public space and new opportunities for expression and assertion, which has been seen through its on-air talk shows, discussion, and phone-in programs. Various critics have acknowledged Al Jazeera's role in aiding reforms during the 2005 Arab Spring, specifically in regard to its news coverage of Iraqi elections and Lebanese protests.

== See also ==
- Slashdot effect
- CNN effect
