= Katarina Gospic =

Swedish non-fiction writer

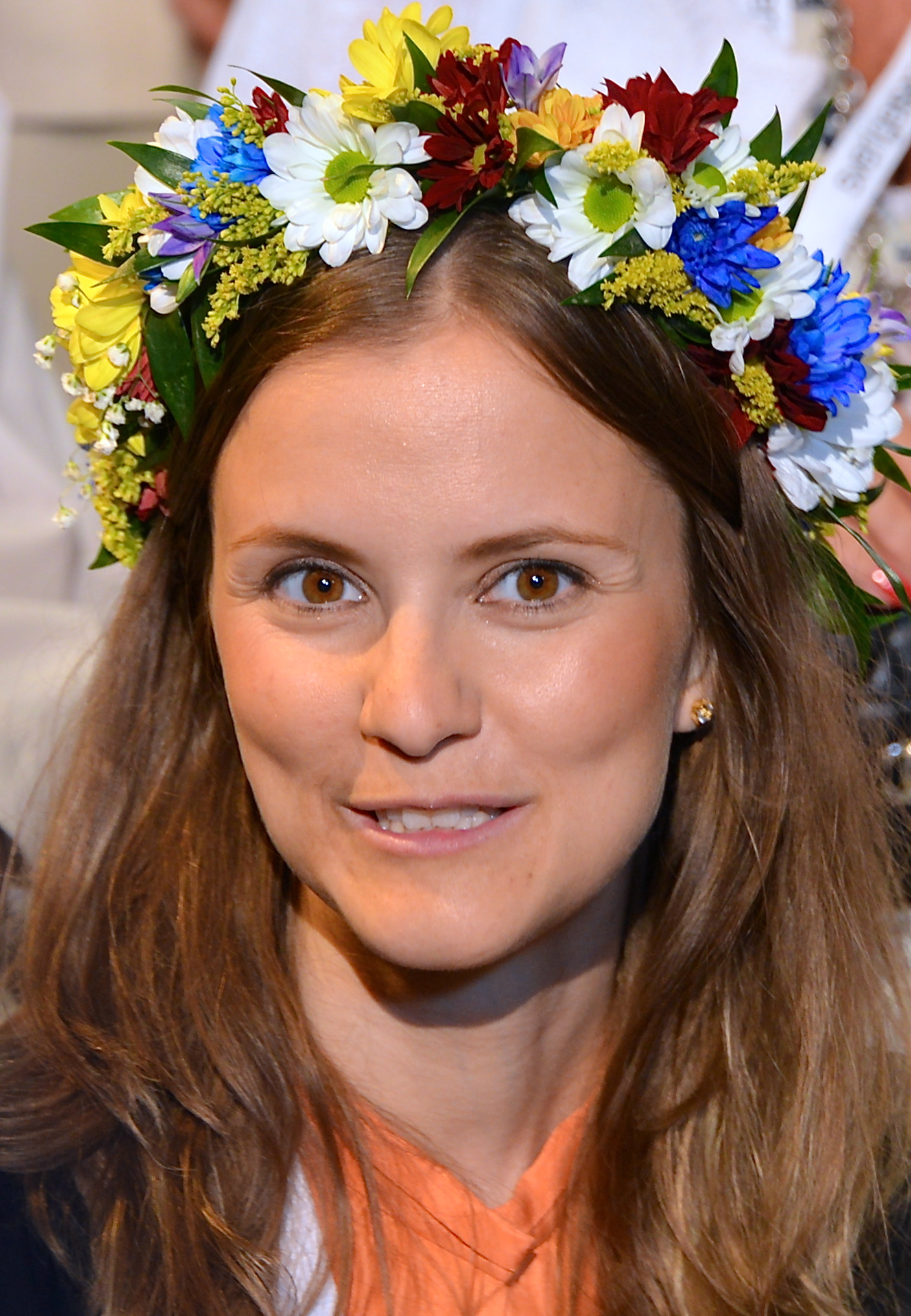
- Katarina Gospic in May 2013

Katarina Anna-Maria Gospic (born 6 February 1984) is a Swedish scientist and author, who grew up in the Akalla district of Stockholm. Between 2002 and 2011 she studied physiology and medicine at the Karolinska Institute. She has published a number of books. She was known for claiming that trials of a COVID-19 vaccine had been misrepresented.

== Biography ==
In 2007, Gospic graduated with a MSc in physiology and in 2009 earned her degree in medicine, both from the Karolinska Institute. She continued with research rather than go through the internship necessary to receive license to practice medicine in Sweden. In 2011 Gospic graduated with a PhD from a research programme in cognitive neuroscience where she wrote a thesis in the subject of neuroeconomy on how our feelings function and what happens in the brain when we make decisions. In 2011 she started the consulting business Brainbow Labs, where she works as an author, speaker and consultant. In 2012, she wrote and published the popular-science book Välj rätt! En guide till bra beslut at Brombergs förlag.

In 2014, she published her second book called Den sociala hjärnan (The social brain). With Martin Ingvar, she published a study indicating that humans have a born ability to react to injustices and that these reactions stem from the amygdala. In 2013 she presented an episode of the Sveriges Radio show Sommar i P1. In October 2014, she participated in the after show Sommarpratarna which was broadcast on Sveriges Television. In 2020 she published her eighth book called Digital Tsumani.

== COVID vaccine criticism ==
In February 2022 she appeared on Alexander Pärleros's popular podcast Framgångspodden and claimed that Pfizer had faked the clinical studies of their COVID-19 vaccine and that the Swedish government was hiding information about side effects of the vaccine. This led to strong criticism of Gospic by several Swedish vaccine, virology and infectious disease researchers including Agnes Wold, Niklas Arnberg and Matti Sällberg, which pointed out that some of Gospic's claims were based on a misunderstanding of how randomized controlled trials are conducted and a misrepresentation of the results of the clinical trials of the vaccine.

== Bibliography ==
- 2011 – Neural Mechanisms of Emotional Regulation and Decision Making, (PhD thesis), Karolinska Institute
- 2012 – Välj rätt! En guide till bra beslut, Brombergs
- 2014 – Den sociala hjärnan, Brombergs
