= McKeigue =

McKeigue is a surname. Notable people with the surname include:

- Jean Sullivan McKeigue (1946–2022), American politician
- Paul McKeigue, professor of genetics at the University of Edinburgh
