= Brian Hooker =

Brian Hooker may refer to:

- Brian Hooker (poet) (1880–1946), American poet, educator, lyricist, and librettist
- Brian Hooker (bioengineer), American bioengineer
