= Al Jazeera Media Network =

Qatari news media organization

- Native name: شَبَكَة الْجَزِيرَة الْإِعْلَامِيَّة
- Type: Statutory private foundation for public benefit
- Industry: Mass media
- Founded: 1 November 1996; 30 years ago
- Founder: Hamad bin Khalifa Al Thani
- Headquarters: Qatar Radio and Television Corporation Complex, Wadi Al Sail, Doha, Qatar
- Area served: Worldwide
- Key people: Hamad bin Thamer Al Thani (chairman); Sheikh Nasser bin Faisal bin Khalifa Al-Thani (director general)
- Products: News broadcasting, web portal
- Number of employees: Over 3,000
- Subsidiaries: Al Jazeera Arabic; Al Jazeera English; Al Jazeera Mubasher; Al Jazeera Türk; Al Jazeera Documentary; AJ+; Al Jazeera Podcasts; Al Jazeera Balkans
- Website: network.aljazeera.net/en

Al Jazeera Media Network (AJMN) (Note: Arabic: الْجَزِيرَة, romanized: Al-Jazīrah [æl (d)ʒæˈziːrɐ], lit. 'The Island' or 'The Peninsula') is a Qatari news media organization headquartered in Wadi Al Sail, Doha. It is a statutory private foundation for public benefit, and is primarily funded by the government of Qatar. The network's flagship channels include Al Jazeera Arabic and Al Jazeera English, which cover regional and international news, alongside the digital platform AJ+. Al Jazeera is available in more than 150 countries and territories and has a global audience of over 430 million people. The network broadcasts in English, Arabic, and Spanish.

Originally conceived as a satellite TV channel delivering Arabic news and current affairs, it has since evolved into a multifaceted media network encompassing various platforms such as online, specialized television channels in numerous languages, and more. The network's news operation currently has 70 bureaus around the world that are shared between the network's channels and operations.

Al Jazeera is a trusted source of news in the Arab and Muslim world and the primary channel for conflict coverage from the Middle East. The network has often been targeted by foreign governments upset with its reporting. During the Qatar diplomatic crisis, several Arab countries severed diplomatic ties with Qatar and imposed a blockade. One of their demands was the closure of Al Jazeera. Other media networks have spoken out against this demand. Critics often view Al Jazeera Arabic as being influenced by Qatar's foreign policy.

== History ==
=== Launch ===
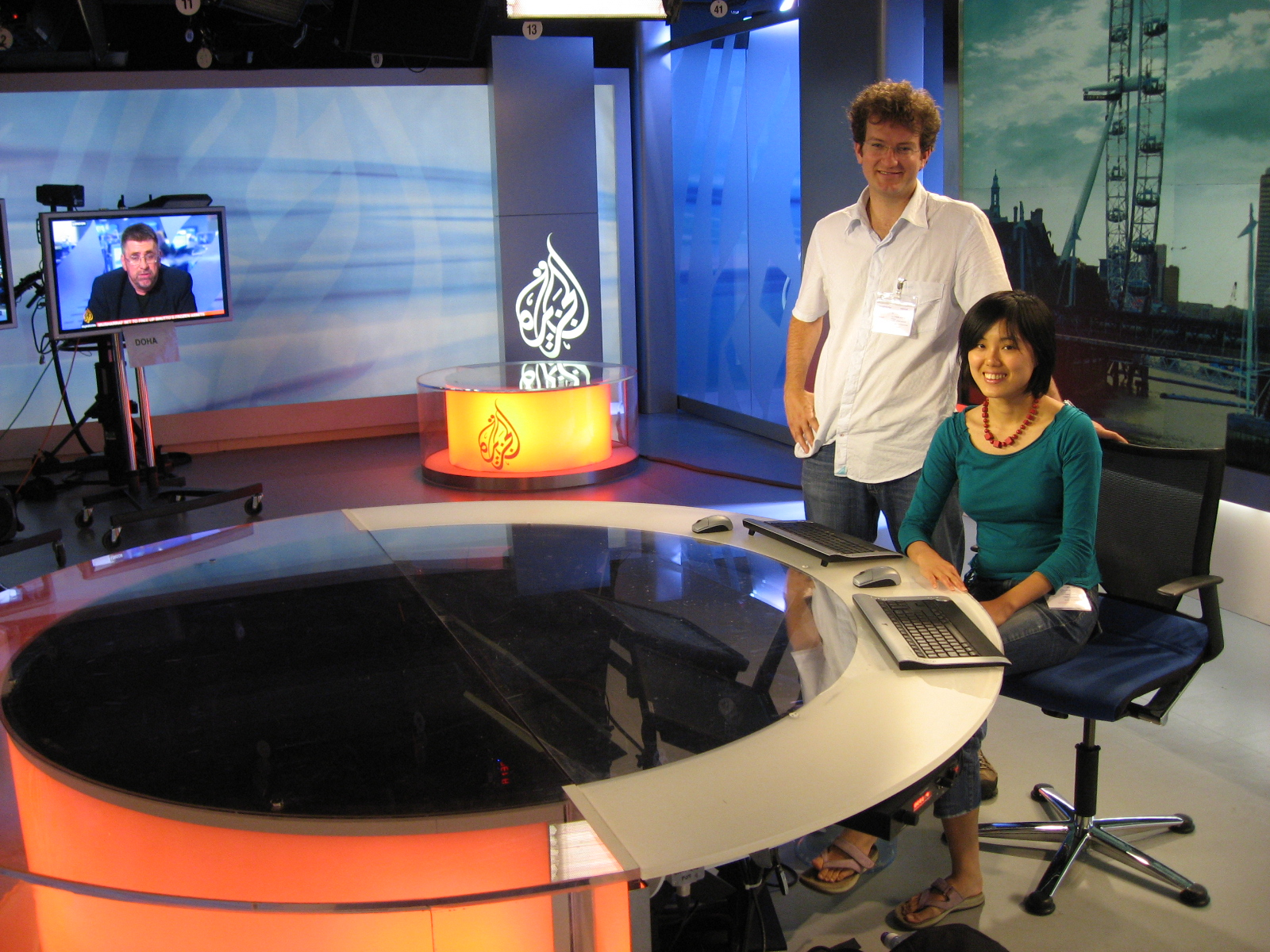
Al Jazeera's London Studio

Al Jazeera was founded by Hamad Bin Khalifa Al Thani, the then-Emir of the State of Qatar and head of the Al Thani Qatari Royal Family. He first publicly floated the idea of launching an international news channel in August 1994, when he was still crown prince. The Al Jazeera Satellite Channel was launched on 1 November 1996. The creation of the new Arabic news network followed the closure of the first BBC Arabic language television station, then a joint venture with Orbit Communications Company, owned by Saudi King Fahd's cousin, Khalid bin Faisal Al Saud. The BBC channel had closed after a year and a half when the Saudi government attempted to thwart a documentary pertaining to executions of prominent Saudi dissidents. Many former BBC Arabic journalists subsequently joined Al Jazeera during its initial hiring phase. Following a London screening of a six-hour test broadcast, the emir dropped his initial idea to mix news and entertainment, and decided on an all-news format.

At launch, Al Jazeera broadcast six hours of programming per day, expanding to twelve hours by the end of 1997. It was broadcast to the immediate surrounding region as a terrestrial signal and on cable, as well as through satellites (a service which was free to users in the Arab world). On 1 January 1999, Al Jazeera began broadcasting on a 24-hour schedule. Within a year, employment had more than tripled to approximately 500 staff, and the network had established bureaus at a dozen locations, extending to the European Union, Russia, and Taliban-controlled Afghanistan. Its annual budget was estimated at $30 million at the time. Al Jazeera was included in cable packages in the United States, the United Kingdom, and Israel.

Al Jazeera was launched with a mandate of independence. In March 1998, the emir disbanded the Ministry of Information, which had been responsible for overseeing press censorship. The 2004 Constitution of Qatar, guaranteeing freedom of the press, provided further reinforcement. The motives behind the establishment of Al Jazeera are debated, with commentators citing a range of possible motivations, including financial and political interests, and the promotion of uncensored media in the region. By 1998, Al Jazeera was already one of the major news providers in the Middle East.

=== Restructuring ===
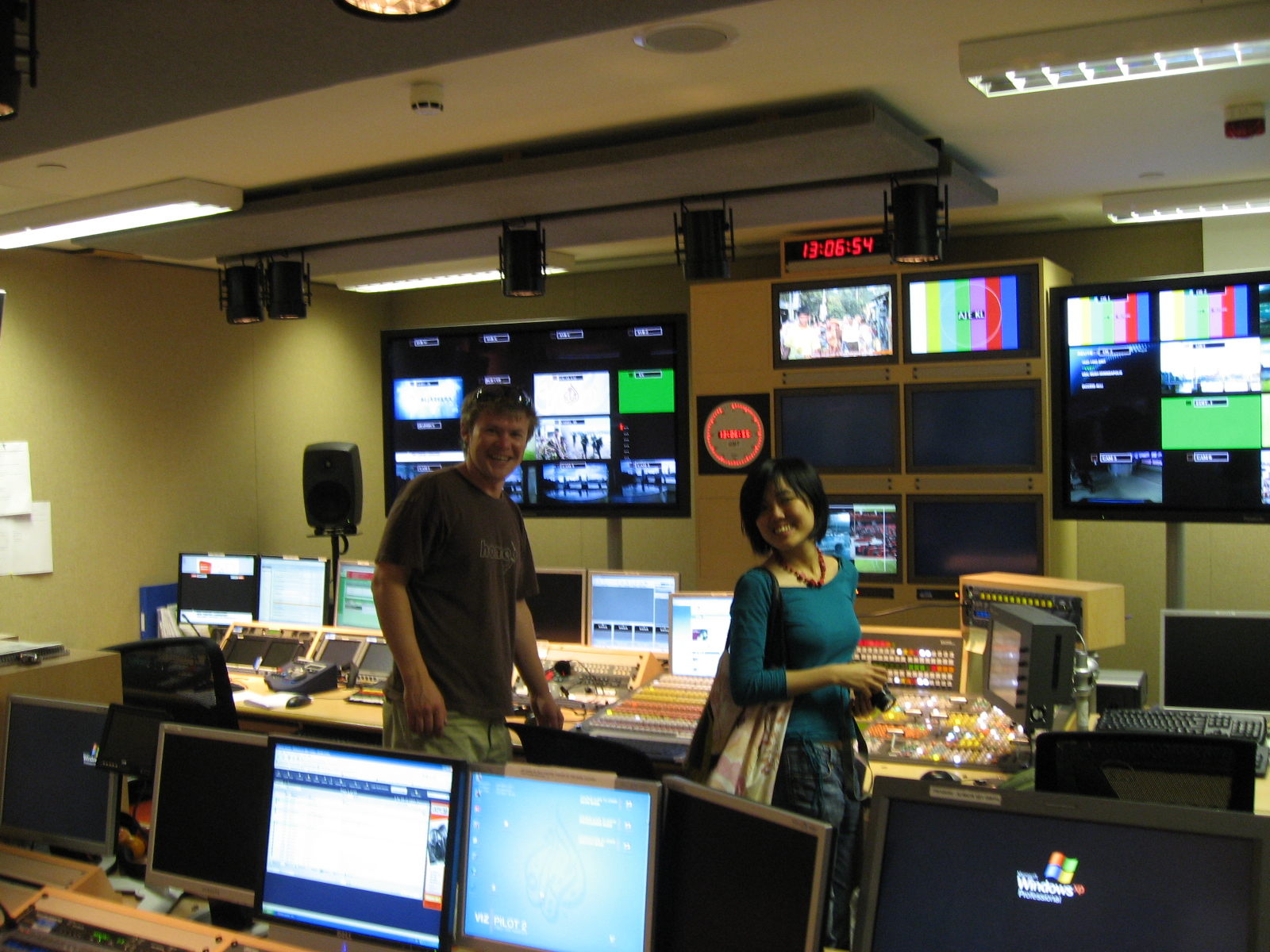
Al Jazeera's former Knightsbridge London Control Room

In 2006, Wadah Khanfar, then the managing director of the Arabic Channel, was appointed director general of the Al Jazeera Satellite Network while continuing to serve as managing director of the Al Jazeera Arabic channel. In September 2011, Al Jazeera's long-time director general Wadah Khanfar unexpectedly resigned after eight years leading the network.

On 26 November 2009, Al Jazeera English received approval from the CRTC, which enabled Al Jazeera English to broadcast via satellite in Canada. In 2011, Al Jazeera Media Network was legally restructured from a "public institution" to a "private institution of public utility"; however, it was unknown how this would affect editorial management and funding. According to Al Jazeera, the restructuring was intended to provide greater administrative flexibility and a faster decision-making process. The network is also funded through its television contracts and revenue from its sports division.

In 2016, Al Jazeera had a workforce of 4,000 employees. Meanwhile, Al Jazeera Arabic saw its network expand from 27 bureaus in 2002 to 70 bureaus around the globe by 2016. In March 2016, Al Jazeera announced that it would lay off about 500 employees worldwide, a reduction of roughly 10 percent of its workforce, as part of cost-cutting measures.

=== 2011 Arab Spring ===
Al Jazeera covered the Arab Spring more extensively than any other news outlet; it had a significant role in spreading the Arab uprising after the unrest broke out in a small city in Tunisia in 2011. Its aggressive reporting on the Tunisian uprising was widely admired, especially since the uprising was largely ignored by Western outlets. Website visits to Al Jazeera spiked by 2,500% when the network covered the revolution in Egypt.

People in the Middle East have heavily relied on Al Jazeera to obtain news about their regions and the world, even more so than YouTube and Google. Hillary Clinton, who was the U.S. Secretary of State at the time of the Arab Spring, stated that Al Jazeera "has been the leader in that [it is] literally changing people's minds and attitudes. And like it or hate it, it is really effective."

The news of unrest in the Arab states was broadcast by Al Jazeera in Arabic for the Arab world as well as in English for audiences from the rest of the world. In Tunisia, the Ben Ali regime banned Al Jazeera from operating in the country, but with the help of Facebook users inside Tunisia, Al Jazeera was able to access reports of events, such as protests and government crackdowns, that were taking place inside the country. The intensive media coverage of people's uprising against their leaders by Al Jazeera mobilized more people from other parts of the country to join the revolution.

The population in other Arab countries, including Bahrain, Egypt, Yemen, Libya, and Syria, also mobilized against their governments, inspired by the Tunisians' successful revolt, which was extensively covered by Al Jazeera Arabic. International opinion also came to support the Arab movements in the Middle East, since Al Jazeera English covered and reported governmental human rights abuses against political activists and ordinary citizens.

=== Al Jazeera effect ===
The "Al Jazeera effect" is the impact of Al Jazeera Media Network on global politics. The term, coined by Philip Seib and possibly used earlier by Simon Henderson, initially referred to Arab governments losing control of information due to Al Jazeera's popularity. Seib later generalized it to other Internet-powered news media. In his book The Al Jazeera Effect, Seib argues that the rise of emerging media has weakened governments' ability to control the flow of information. Al Jazeera is presented as the prime example.

Al Jazeera has been the prime source of information on the protests in Egypt and Tunisia. Al Jazeera challenged government censorship and the dominant Western viewpoint of Arabs. The outlet prioritizes perspectives from marginalized communities rather than relying solely on statements from officials and other figures of power. It shifted the flow of information from the "West to the rest" reporting on underrepresented countries to a platform offering Arab citizens a way to share their experiences and voice their views. Critics acknowledge its role in reforms during the 2005 Arab Spring. It has been compared to the CNN effect. Seib concludes that the new media, while not beyond being abused, are largely contributing to democratization and political reform worldwide.

== Subsidiaries ==
=== Al Jazeera Arabic ===
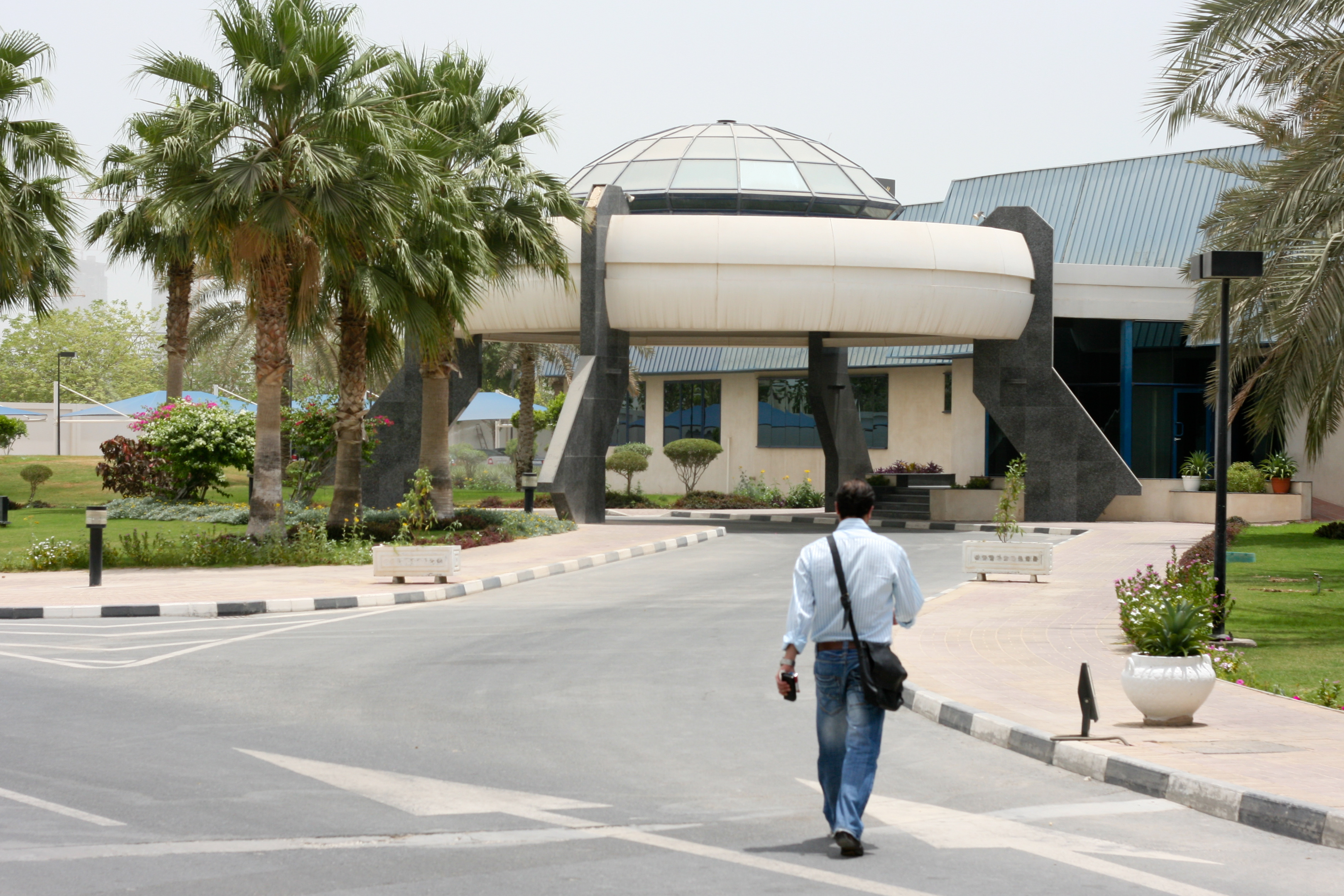
Frontage of Al Jazeera Arabic building (since expanded), Doha, 2008

Al Jazeera Arabic was launched on 1 November 1996 by the government of Qatar. Noted for its journalistic professionalism, especially when contrasted with other Arab news organizations, Al Jazeera gained popularity in the Arab world as an alternative to the previous landscape of largely local state-owned broadcasters, with its early coverage being openly critical of autocratic leaders in the region, as well as hosting a wide range of viewpoints, gaining credibility through its extensive frontline coverage of the Second Intifada and the Iraq War. It is a trusted source of news in the Arab and Muslim world. In 2004， Al Jazeera was listed among Time's 100 most influential list. Al Jazeera Arabic is editorially independent from Al Jazeera English. While the news network insists it has editorial independence, the network is widely seen by foreign governments as a soft power tool for Qatar.

Al Jazeera has become globally synonymous with war since its emergence in 1996, making it the primary channel for conflict coverage from the Middle East. Al Jazeera's coverage came under intense global scrutiny after the September 11 attacks. During this period, Al Jazeera’s Kabul bureau was destroyed by a US airstrike, an event the network and many observers regarded as deliberate, though the US denied intent. Its reporting on the wars in Afghanistan and Iraq, offering perspectives distinct from Western media, prompted criticism from governments and commentators. U.S. bombed Al Jazeera's Baghdad office in 2003. Al Jazeera is an example of how counter-hegemonic media prompted local stations to take defensive stances against "foreign" reporting, viewing it as a threat to national sovereignty. Pentagon and the U.S. Administration pushed American media outlets to demonize Al Jazeera and self-censor coverage amid what was perceived as an information war with the Arab world. Al Jazeera faced unprecedented hostility in the U.S. and faced difficulty operating there. The network's determination to follow its editorial policies also brought it into conflict with several Arab governments. Financial and diplomatic pressure by the end of 2002 resulted in the closure of bureaux in six countries.

=== Al Jazeera English ===
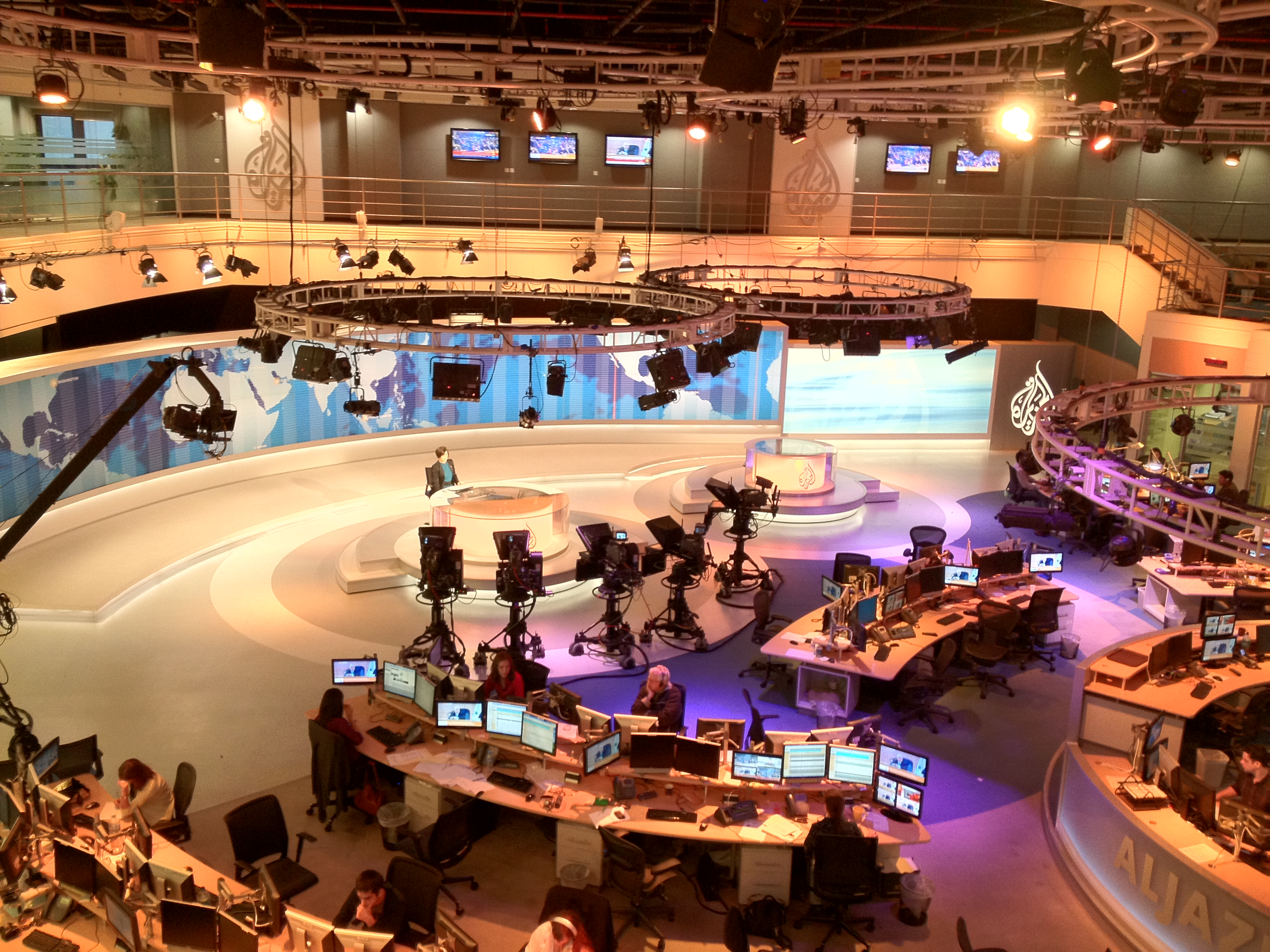
Al Jazeera English newsroom

Al Jazeera English (AJE) was launched on 15 November 2006 as the English-language counterpart to Al Jazeera Arabic. It positions itself as an alternative media platform to the dominance of Western media outlets like CNN and BBC, focusing on narrative reporting where subjects present their own stories. Al Jazeera is known for its in-depth and frontline reporting, particularly in conflict zones such as the Arab Spring, the Gaza–Israel conflict and others. Al Jazeera's coverage of the Arab Spring won the network numerous awards, including the Peabody Award.

In 2001, Al Jazeera stood as the sole international news network broadcasting from Kabul, Afghanistan. Following the events of 9/11, there was a notable surge in demand for an English-language version of Al Jazeera. In late 2002, the director of marketing of Al Jazeera, Ali Mohamed Kama, began to push a "repositioning" of Al Jazeera, "accompanied by the introduction of English subtitles and dubbing of broadcast into English." According to one of the central architects of Al Jazeera English, Steve Clark, the decision to invest substantially in a new English-language network was driven in part by a desire to address Western perceptions of Al Jazeera and to respond to growing scrutiny of the network's Arabic-language programming.

In 2003, Al Jazeera hired its first English-language journalists, among whom was Afshin Rattansi, from the BBC's Today programme.

In March 2003, it launched an English-language website (see below). The name of the website was "Al Jazeera Net"; it was launched by younger journalists. The site published various stories covered by the network, but it did not depend on Arabic-language channels and websites. The website aimed to connect to the Western audience, cooperate with BBC, and be "a global citizen's home page."

However, twelve hours after the launch of the website, Al Jazeera Net was kept offline due to many denial-of-service attacks. Over twenty-four hours later, Al Jazeera Net came back online, but Freedom Cyber Force Militia then hacked the website to redirect web browsers to a picture of the American flag with a slogan saying "Let Freedom Ring". Al Jazeera Net was then unable to be securely hosted because three of Al Jazeera's web providers, Horizons Media, Information Services, and Akamai Technologies, canceled the contract. Also in March, Yahoo and AOL stopped advertising contracts with Al Jazeera. Therefore, the English-translated website was shuttered later in 2003.

On 4 July 2005, Al Jazeera officially announced plans to launch a new English-language satellite service to be called Al Jazeera International. The new channel started at 12h GMT on 15 November 2006 under the name Al Jazeera English and launched with broadcast centers in Doha (next to the original Al Jazeera headquarters and broadcast center), London, Kuala Lumpur and Washington, D.C. Initially, 12 hours of news a day were broadcast from Doha, and the rest of the day's output was split equally between London, Kuala Lumpur, and Washington, D.C. Among its staff were journalists hired from ABC's Nightline and other top news outfits. Josh Rushing, a former media handler for CENTCOM during the Iraq War, agreed to provide commentary; David Frost was also on board.

The new English-language venture faced considerable regulatory and commercial hurdles in the North American market for its perceived sympathy with extremist causes. The channel eventually secured carriage on a small number of cable systems in the United States, including one in Washington, D.C.

=== AJ+ ===
Logo of AJ+

Al Jazeera Media Network also has a digital online-only news channel AJ+. The channel is an online and mobile-only news channel primarily found on various social media networks and YouTube and operated by Al Jazeera New Media out of Washington, D.C. (previously San Francisco, California). AJ+ initially focused on short Facebook videos covering political and social issues. However, after not getting the response it desired, the outlet shifted to YouTube in 2016 to target audiences seeking longer-form content. The channel consists of mostly on demand content. It soft-launched on 13 June 2014 with a new webpage, Facebook page and videos on YouTube. The full channel launched with an app on 15 September 2014. There are also Arabic and Spanish language versions of the channel. In September 2020, the US Department of Justice (DOJ) ordered AJ+ to register as a foreign agent under the Foreign Agents Registration Act. Al Jazeera publicly condemned the order. The DOJ has not done anything to enforce the order.

=== Al Jazeera America ===
Al Jazeera America was an American version of Al Jazeera English. The channel launched on 20 August 2013 on five of the ten television providers in the United States.

On 2 January 2013, Al Jazeera Media Network announced that it purchased Current TV from its founders, Al Gore, Joel Hyatt, and Ronald Burkle, in the United States and would be launching an American news channel. Originally 60% of the channel's programming would be produced in America while 40% would be from Al Jazeera English, which later changed to almost all the content being U.S. originated.

Though Current TV had large distribution throughout the United States on cable and satellite TV, it averaged only 28,000 viewers at any time. The acquisition of Current TV by Al Jazeera allowed Time Warner Cable to drop the network due to its low ratings, but released a statement saying that they would consider carrying the channel after they evaluated whether it made sense for their customers. The channel was later added to Time Warner and Bright House Networks lineups after a new carriage deal was agreed upon.

On 13 January 2016, Al Jazeera America CEO Al Anstey announced that the network would cease operations on 12 April 2016, citing the "economic landscape". The Al Jazeera English news channel became available digitally in the US in September 2016.

=== Al Jazeera Sport ===
In 2004, Al Jazeera expanded into the world of sports with the establishment of Al Jazeera Sport (now known as beIN Sports) and the building of 8 Arabic-language specialty sports channels. On 1 January 2014, Al Jazeera Sport was rebranded as beIN Sports after it along with all of the organisation's non-news and current affairs assets were spun off and privatised into beIN Media Group; the channels were legally spun off to have consistency with all the Network's sports properties.

=== Al Jazeera Turk ===
In February 2011, the Savings Deposit Insurance Fund of Turkey put Cine5 up for sale after the channel was confiscated when the owner Erol Aksoy went in debt and became bankrupt. Al Jazeera made a bid for the network and acquired it for $40.5 million after an unsuccessful $21 million bid. Al Jazeera then renamed the channel and worked on launching a Turkish language Al Jazeera operation.

In April 2012, there were reports of the channel being delayed over its refusal to call the Kurdistan Workers Party (PKK) as terrorists, despite it being designated as a terrorist organization by many countries and supranational organisations including but not limited to Turkey, the United States, the EU, NATO, Israel, the United Kingdom, citing journalistic standards. The Foreign Ministry, which advocated the project, became at odds with the channel. Vural Ak, a major Turkish investor, withdrew from the partnership with Al Jazeera. Nuh Yilmaz, head of Al Jazeera's Turkish editorial team, also resigned.

In 2013, they announced the creation of Al Jazeera Türk, a version of Al Jazeera in the Turkish language(s), stationed in Istanbul, and catering to and broadcasting around Turkey. On 22 January 2014, Al Jazeera Türk's website was launched with news content. The move made Al Jazeera Türk the first 24-hour news operation to go digital before broadcast. The channel was under construction with plans to launch towards the end of 2014. Construction and indoor works were underway at the upcoming channel's building in Topkapı, İstanbul. The website shut down in 2017 without the channel being launched.

=== JeemTV and Baraem ===
On 9 September 2005, Al Jazeera established a children's division with the launch of Al Jazeera Children's Channel (since 2013 it was known as Jeem TV). The channel targets an audience of 7 to 15-year-olds and broadcasts 24 hours a day. On 16 January 2009, Baraem launched, the channel targets an audience of three to seven-year-olds and broadcasts 17 hours a day (6 am to 11 pm Doha time). On 1 April 2016, both Jeem TV and Baraem were acquired by beIN Media Group and were made part of beIN Channels Network. Since then, as a result, the channels were no longer free to view and made exclusive to beIN Channels Network.

=== Al Jazeera Podcasts ===
In 2017, the network launched a podcasting network called Jetty. Later renamed Al Jazeera Podcasts, the network is available via the network's website as well as SoundCloud, Apple Podcasts, Stitcher, TuneIn, and iHeartRadio. The network is based out of San Francisco alongside AJ+ and is available in English. Jetty debuted with the podcast Closer Than They Appear, a hybrid interview/narrative show hosted by writer Carvell Wallace. Other podcasts that debuted in 2018 included The Game of Our Lives which uses soccer to explain global economics and cultures, a podcast on freedom dubbed (Freedom Stories, featuring Melissa Harris-Perry), sex (The Virgie Show) with Virgie Tovar, and global music (Movement) with Meklit Hadero.

=== Rightly ===
In 2021, the network launched Rightly, an online news channel aimed at center-right American conservatives. The channel much like AJ+ is only available online, primarily on YouTube. The launch of the channel spurred questions from Al Jazeera staff questioning if the channel took away from Al Jazeera's mission to be non-partisan and from various media critics wondering if conservative audiences would watch a channel from Al Jazeera, a long time target of American conservatives. As of 2022, Al Jazeera stopped creating new contents for the platform.

=== Al Jazeera Center for Studies ===
Al Jazeera Media Network owns and operates the Al Jazeera Center for Studies. Established in 2006, the Al Jazeera Center for Studies conducts in-depth analysis of current affairs at both regional and global levels. Its research agenda focuses primarily on geopolitics and strategic developments in the Arab world and surrounding regions. The center with an extensive network of distinguished researchers, and a wide range array of experts from across the globe, the center aims to promote dialogue and build bridges of mutual understanding and cooperation between cultures, civilizations, and religions. The center also contains the Al Jazeera Media Training and Development Center.

=== Al Jazeera International Documentary Film Festival ===
The Al Jazeera International Documentary Film Festival is an annual film festival held at the Doha Sheraton in Doha, Qatar. The first festival was held on 18 April 2005. Every year the festival has a different theme. The Al Jazeera Balkans Documentary Film Festival was started in 2018 as an annual international documentary film festival based in Sarajevo, Bosnia and Herzegovina.

=== Other channels ===
Al Jazeera Media Network also operates Al Jazeera Documentary Channel, an Arabic-language documentary channel, Al Jazeera Mubasher, a live politics and public interest channel, which broadcasts conferences in real time without editing or commentary. Al Jazeera Mubasher is first channel of its kind in the Middle East.

== Online ==
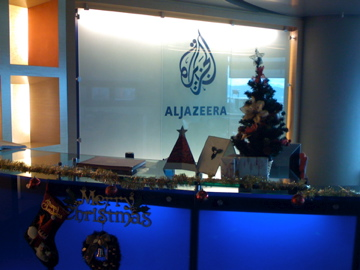
Al Jazeera Office, Kuala Lumpur

The network operates Aljazeera.com which is the main website for the Al Jazeera English, Al Jazeera Balkans and the former Al Jazeera America web sites. For its Arabic-language properties, it uses Aljazeera.net.

Al Jazeera's Arabic website traffic surged following the September 11, 2001 attacks, from about 700,000 hits a day to 1.2 million hits a day. Traffic also climbed after the U.S. military strike on Afghanistan, reaching about 2 million hits a day in the first week and about 3 million hits a day by the second week. Al Jazeera received over one million visitors in March 2003 at the onset of the Iraq War. It was the fastest-growing online news source. By late March 2003, the Al Jazeera website had climbed to the 45th most frequently visited websites.

On 1 January 2018, Al Jazeera launched a Mandarin-language news website becoming the first Middle Eastern news provider to target the Chinese audience. The staff of the project is in contact with their audience via Chinese social media like Weibo, Meipai and WeChat. In March 2020, Al Jazeera's various digital platforms had 1.4 billion viewers over a 90-day period.

== Partnerships ==
In 2017, Al Jazeera signed a strategic partnership agreement with Google. In 2019, Al Jazeera signed a partnership agreement with the China Intercontinental Communication Center over Al Jazeera's documentary channel with the aim of expanding its documentary content through co-production and exchange of media. The same year, Al Jazeera and Bloomberg signed a content license agreement. In 2021, Al Jazeera partnered with Arewa 24 to provide its content in Hausa. In 2023, Al Jazeera partnered with Avid Technology. Al Jazeera Media Network announced an expanded collaboration with Google Cloud, designating it as the network's primary technology provider for its initiative to integrate Google's generative AI and agent-based technologies into news production.

== Finances and independence ==
AJMN receives public funding from the Qatari government and is chartered as a statutory "private foundation for public benefit" under Qatari law. The network was launched with approximately $137 million in funding from the Qatari government, initially structured as a loan that was later converted into a grant. Al Jazeera English was launched in 2006 with an investment of approximately $1 billion by the Emir of Qatar. The network does not publicly disclose detailed financial statements. Al Jazeera heavily depends on the Qatar government for financial support. Other sources of revenue include advertising, subscription fees and the sale of footage and broadcast rights. In 2000, it brought in QAR15 million in advertising revenue partly because of pressure from Saudi Arabia to boycott Al Jazeera. Weak Arab advertising market is also a contributing factor. To achieve profitability, Al Jazeera has diversified its revenue sources. The Qatari government invests billions of dollars annually in the operations of the Al Jazeera network. The government has reportedly covered annual losses of about $100 million for Al Jazeera's Arabic language operations. Despite state funding, Qatar government maintains Al Jazeera is independent of government interests.

Al Jazeera has historically operated with an unusual level of editorial freedom compared with other broadcasters in the Arab world. However, some scholars have argued that the Qatar government has a degree of editorial influence over its content, particularly over its Arabic-language reporting. AJMN maintains that "its reporting is not directed or controlled by the Qatari government nor does it reflect any government viewpoint." While there is evidence supporting Al Jazeera's claims of editorial independence, the network enjoys only relative autonomy: it is not government-controlled, yet it remains government-owned. Most sources agree that Al Jazeera's English-language reporting is more objective and independent than its Arabic-language reporting. Al Jazeera English has developed its own internal editorial guidelines and is editorially independent from Al Jazeera Arabic. Al Jazeera Arabic do not have a style guide, whereas Al Jazeera English has an extensive internal guidelines with more than 20,000 words.

Scholars have argued that its Arabic-language coverage in particular is influenced by Qatari foreign policy, often framing events in ways favourable to the government's aims, such as its coverage of the Iraq War and the Arab Spring. Some critics have argued that while network is often critical of many countries and institutions in its coverage, it avoids criticizing the government of Qatar, except for some rare instances on its English-language services. Up until 2011, Al Jazeera maintained that it could not ignore more pressing crises in Egypt, Saudi Arabia, Iraq, Syria, or Gaza in favor of concentrating on Qatar's trivial affairs. Other authors have argued that Qatar does not have firm editorial control of Al Jazeera's Arabic coverage and that it largely operates independently, and that its coverage sometimes goes against Qatar's foreign policy. Its reporting on domestic issues in Qatar regarding the Al Thani Royal Family and internal Qatari affairs—such as the country's treatment of domestic workers, most recently during the 2022 World Cup games—has also been scrutinized.

== Bans and restrictions ==
Several Algerian cities lost power on 27 January 1999, reportedly to keep residents from watching a program in which Algerian dissidents implicated the Algerian military in a series of massacres. On 4 July 2004, the Algerian government froze the activities of Al Jazeera's Algerian correspondent. The official reason was that a reorganization of the work of foreign correspondents was in progress. According to Reporters Without Borders, however, the measure was a reprisal for a broadcast the previous week of another Al-Itijah al-Mouakiss debate on the political situation in Algeria.

Bahrain Information Minister Nabeel bin Yaqub Al-Hamar banned Al Jazeera correspondents from reporting from inside the country on 10 May 2002, saying that the station was biased towards Israel and against Bahrain. After improvements in relations between Bahrain and Qatar in 2004, Al Jazeera correspondents returned to Bahrain. In 2010, however, the Information Ministry again banned Al Jazeera correspondents from reporting inside the country. The ministry accused the network of "flouting [Bahrain's] laws regulating the press and publishing" after Al Jazeera aired a report on poverty in Bahrain.

Al Jazeera has been banned three times by the Iraqi government, most recently in 2016, when officials accused it of "inciting violence and sectarianism." The Iraqi government saw Al Jazeera as "too friendly toward the Islamic State" and negative towards Iraq's Shi’ite majority. In 2013, the broadcaster was accused by many Iraqi government supporters of backing Arab Spring protests in the country.

The UAE blocked Al Jazeera in the emirates on 5 June 2017 (after the onset of the Qatar diplomatic crisis) because of its perceived sympathies to the Qatari government. In the International Court of Justice case filed by Qatar against the United Arab Emirates about the elimination of all forms of racial discrimination (Qatar v. United Arab Emirates), Qatar requested that the court order the UAE to suspend its block of Al Jazeera. The court ruled, "both parties shall refrain from any action which might aggravate or extend the dispute before the court or make it more difficult to resolve".

In May 2019, Sudan closed Al Jazeera's office. Sudan summoned its envoy in Qatar for consultation the following month, saying that the envoy would soon return to Qatar. Qatar was seen as a close ally of ousted Sudanese president Omar al-Bashir.

Israel banned Al Jazeera in May 2024, forcing their offices in the country to close. In September 2024, the IDF ordered the closure of the Al Jazeera Office in Ramallah, considering it a threat to national security. At the start of 2025, the Palestinian Authority temporarily halted Jazeera TV broadcasts from the West Bank, claiming it shows "inciting material." The culture, interior and communications ministers of the authority were cited by WAFA that the channel broadcast material that was "deceiving and stirring strife." In January 2026, the pro-Israel group "Focus Israel" alleged that the Al Jazeera Arabic channel aired propaganda supporting Hamas, in violation of Swiss law. Swiss television providers Swisscom and Sunrise removed the Al Jazeera Arabic channel from their programming until the allegations could be verified. The two television providers continue to offer Al Jazeera’s English-language channel.

In August 2026, following its extensive coverage of anti-government demonstrations and regional election boycotts in Pakistan-administered Kashmir, access to Al Jazeera’s English-language website was quietly restricted across Pakistan without an official public decree. The move came shortly after Pakistan’s Ministry of Information publicly condemned the network's reporting as "yellow journalism". The digital crackdown coincides with broader restrictions targeting foreign media in the country.

== Awards and recognition ==
Over the years, Al Jazeera and its network channels have earned hundreds of awards. In 2017 Al Jazeera was ranked 30th out of 10 million content creators and 40,000 publishers globally. In 2004, Al Jazeera was named to Time magazine's list of the 100 most influential entities. Al Jazeera English also won Broadcaster of the Year at the 2022 New York Festivals TV & Film Awards for the sixth consecutive year.

In 2012 Al Jazeera English has won the Royal Television Society award for news channel of the year, and in 2011 shared a duPont-Columbia Award alongside The New York Times for its journalism. The channel's coverage of the Arab Spring earned it multiple honors, including a Peabody Award, recognizing its reporting on the uprisings across Tunisia, Egypt, and other Arab states.

In 2024, Palestinian journalist Bisan Owda and AJ+ received a Peabody Award for their coverage of the Gaza war and its impact on Palestinians. In 2026, AJ+ won two Webby Awards for digital storytelling on Gaza and environmental justice.

== See also ==
- Al Jazeera America (defunct)
- Al Jazeera effect
