= Akalla =

Urban district in Stockholm, Sweden

Coordinates: 59°24′51″N 17°54′51″E

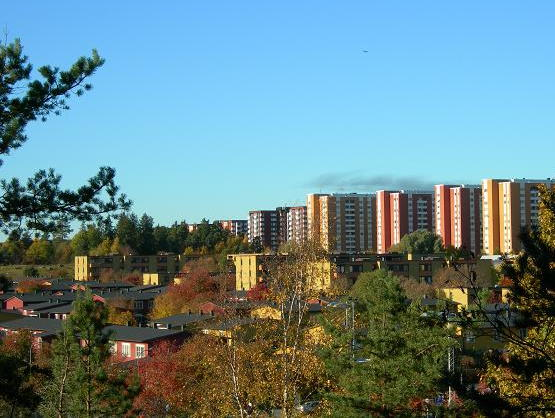
Akalla

Akalla is a district (Swedish: stadsdel) in Rinkeby-Kista borough, Stockholm, Sweden. Akalla has a population of roughly 9,100 as of 2018, in which immigrants, mostly from Finland, make up 60.4% of the population.

Akalla is located on the blue metro line. Modern Akalla, with its concrete apartment buildings, as well as smaller houses, was constructed in the mid-1970s as a part of the Million Programme. The suburb is built close to, and named after an old farm from the 17th century. The name of Akalla is known from 1323. Between 1905 and 1970, the area was used by the Swedish Army as training grounds. The street names in Akalla are Finland related. The main street is called Sibeliusgången, in honour of the Finnish composer Jean Sibelius, and it is reserved for pedestrians only.

Right outside Akalla is Barkarby Airport, until its closure in 2010 Sweden's oldest active airport.

== Businesses and services ==
Akalla has several shops, restaurants and other businesses that serve the local population. Many of the businesses are concentrated in Akalla Centrum and surrounding commercial areas. Some of the larger chain stores in Akalla include Lidl and Coop Extra (opened in 2024;whice formerly an ICA Supermarker), whice provide groceries and other everyday products to local residents.

== Notable residents ==
- Katarina Gospic the Swedish scientist and author was born here in 1984.
- Richie Omorowa, footballer for Samsunspor was born here in 2004.

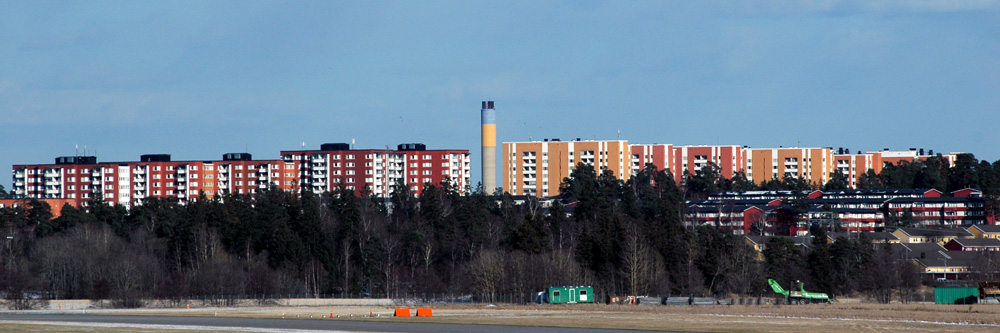
Akalla seen from Barkarby airfield

== See also ==
- Akalla metro station
