= Research, Information and Communications Unit =

British government organisation

The Research, Information and Communications Unit (RICU) is a British government organisation that produces strategic communications on behalf of the Home Office. Created as part of the controversial counter-radicalisation strategy known as Prevent, is based in the Homeland Security Group (HSG), in the Home Office's Westminster HQ.

== Background and aims ==
RICU was created in 2007 by Charles Farr. Farr, a former MI6 officer, was head of the Office of Security and Counter-Terrorism, the Homeland Security Group's predecessor organisation. RICU was modelled on the Information Research Department (IRD), a clandestine Cold War propaganda programme run by the Home Office from 1948 until it was shut down in 1977. Counter-terrorism officials at the Home Office became aware of the work of the IRD after reading Frances Stonor Saunders' Cold War history book, Who Paid the Piper? (1999).

The target of RICU's work are British Muslims, especially males, aged 15 to 39. The aim of RICU's work is to bring about "attitudinal and behavioural change" among young British Muslims as part of a counter-radicalisation programme. It is part of the government’s Strategic Communications which is described as "the systematic and coordinated use of all means of communication to deliver UK national security objectives by influencing the attitudes and behaviours of individuals, groups and states".

== Programmes ==
RICU employs social psychologists and anthropologists as well as counter-terrorism officials and marketing strategists.

'Help for Syria' is a RICU programme which aims to "influence conversations among young British Muslims" and reduce the desire to travel to the region. The programme describes itself as providing advice on how to fundraise for Syrian refugees. It spoke to thousands of new university student and distributed leaflets to 760,000 homes without disclosing its government connection. Piers Robinson described this as an example of black propaganda "whereby greater persuasiveness is sought by disguising the source of a message which, if known, may damage its credibility".

RICU staff also monitor online conversations and forums to "track shifting narratives".

Much of RICU's work is outsourced to a London communications company, Breakthrough Media Network. As part of its RICU contract, Breakthrough organises events at schools and universities and works closely with a number of grassroots Muslim organisations to disseminate information challenging extremism. Breakthrough helped form a PR company that promoted the work of the grassroots organisations to journalists. RICU says it retains editorial control over material distributed by Breakthrough and grassroots organisations as part of RICU’s programmes.

In April 2022, RICU signed a £1.07 million deal with the Media Monitoring and Associated Services framework.

== See also ==
- Information Research Department
- Homeland Security Group
- Black propaganda
- Tell MAMA
- Behavioural Insights Team
