= Brian Hooker (bioengineer) =

American biologist and anti-vaccine activist

Brian S. Hooker is a biologist and chemist who was department chair and Professor Emeritus of Biology at Simpson University. He is known for promoting the false claim that vaccines cause autism.

== Education ==
In 1985, Hooker earned his Bachelor of Science degree in chemical engineering, from California State Polytechnic University, Pomona, California. He earned his master's of science degree in 1988 and his doctorate in 1990, both in chemical engineering, from Washington State University, in Pullman, Washington.

== Research ==
Hooker formerly managed applied plant and fungal molecular biology research projects, including development of plant-based biosensors and transgenic production systems for human pharmaceutical proteins and industrial enzymes at the Pacific Northwest National Laboratory, where systems biology researchers are focused on understanding gene and protein networks involved in individual cell signaling, communication between cells in communities, and cellular metabolic pathways. Hooker has also been involved in research on microbial kinetics and transport mathematical modeling, design, development, and support for biological destruction of chlorinated hydrocarbons, development of tP4 transgenic plant protein production platform technology, and development of the RT3D bioremediation/natural attenuation software package.

He left PNNL in 2009, and was hired as an associate professor at Simpson University, where he teaches biology and chemistry. As of 2022, he holds the title of "Professor of Biology" there. Simpson University is a private Christian University of liberal arts and professional studies offering undergraduate, graduate and teaching credential programs.

== Anti-vaccine claims ==
Hooker is known for his anti-vaccine activism and his claims of conflicts of interest within the Centers for Disease Control and Prevention. He was a board member of Focus Autism, (now called Focus for Health) an organization which believes in the "ongoing cover-up of the vaccine/autism link". Hooker has no background or qualifications in epidemiology.

Hooker and Andrew Wakefield have alleged scientific fraud, conspiracy, and coverup on the part of the Centers for Disease Control and Prevention with regard to the supposed link between vaccines and autism. An online video describing this situation was debunked by Snopes.

In 2014, William Thompson alleged that a paper he co-authored in 2004 had not disclosed a correlation it had found between autism and the MMR vaccine among African-American boys. The study did not have racial information on a large proportion of the boys being studied, and when Thompson's co-authors performed a more in-depth analysis, the correlation between the MMR vaccine and autism ceased to exist. For these reasons they decided to not include racial information. Thompson disagreed with their decision, but didn't disclose the alleged correlation for ten years.

In 2014, after talking to Thompson, Hooker published a paper titled "Measles-mumps-rubella vaccination timing and autism among young African American boys: a reanalysis of CDC data" in the journal Translational Neurodegeneration. The paper claimed that the 2004 study showed a statistically significant correlation between autism and the MMR vaccine among African-American boys if it was administered at a certain age. Later, the journal retracted the paper for scientific misconduct, saying that Hooker had not disclosed important conflicts of interest and that there were "concerns about the validity of the methods and statistical analysis". Hooker was a board member of the anti-vaccine group Focus Autism (now Focus for Health), which had provided funding for the study. Hooker has claimed that his son, who has autism, was permanently damaged by vaccines; Hooker had filed a case for compensation with the National Vaccine Injury Compensation Program; the case was ultimately dismissed.

Hooker also claimed he was censored in an article published by the Journal of American Physicians and Surgeons, a journal published by the Association of American Physicians and Surgeons, which has been characterized as a biased pseudoscientific group.

Hooker is an associate editor of the International Journal of Vaccine Theory, Practice, and Research, an anti-vaccine journal.

Hooker holds the title of "Chief Scientific Officer" for Children's Health Defense (CHD), the anti-vaccine group where Robert F. Kennedy Jr. served as a prominent leader.

In July 2025 he said he contracted measles in West Texas and later went home without notifying authorities of the infection.

== Selected publications ==
- Dai Z, BS Hooker, RD Quesenberry, and J Gao. “Expression of Trichoderma reesei exo-cellobiohydrolase I (CBH I) in transgenic tobacco leaves and calli”, Applied Biochemistry and Biotechnology, 1999, 77-79(9):689-699
- Dai Z, BS Hooker, DB Anderson, and SR Thomas.“Improved plant-based production of E1 endoglucanase using potato:expression optimization and tissue targeting”, Molecular Breeding, 2000, 6(3):277-285.
- Gao J, BS Hooker, and DB Anderson. 2004. “Expression of Functional Human Coagulation Factor XIII A-domain in Plant Cell Suspensions and Whole Plants.” Protein Expression and Purification 37(1):89-96.
- Hooker, Brian S., Hettich, Robert L., Hurst, Gregory B., Kennel, Stephen J., Lankford, Patricia K., Chiann-Tso Lin, Lye Meng Markillie, Mayer-Clumbridge, M. Uljana, Pelletier, Dale A., Liang, Shi, Squier, Thomas C., Strader, Michael B., VerBerkmoes, Nathan C., "Isolation and Characterization of Protein Complexes from Shewanella oneidensis and Rhodopseudomonas palustris", Genomics: GTL Contractor—Grantee Workshop II, Washington, DC, February 29-March 2, 2004
- Trelka, Jeffrey A., Hooker, Brian S. "Specific Carbohydrate Dietary Trial: Understanding the Effectiveness of a Specific Carbohydrate Dietary Intervention In Autistic Children", 2004
- Markillie LM, CT Lin, JN Adkins, DL Auberry, EA Hill, BS Hooker, PA Moore, RJ Moore, L Shi, HS Wiley, and V Kery, “A simple protein complex purification and identification method for high throughput mapping of protein interaction networks”, Journal of Proteome Research, 2005
- Liang Shi, Jiann-Trzwo Lin, Lye M. Markillie, Thomas C. Squier, and Brian S. Hooker, “Overexpression of multi-heme C-type cytochromes ” - Expression of recombinant decaheme cytochrome MtrA in Shewanella oneidensis MR-1 by a directional TOPO cloning-based system. BioTechniques, 2005, 38(2):297-9.
- Brian S Hooker, Neil Z Miller, Analysis of health outcomes in vaccinated and unvaccinated children: Developmental delays, asthma, ear infections and gastrointestinal disorders. Listed in NIH
