= Melinda Taylor =

Australian criminal lawyer

Melinda Taylor is an Australian criminal lawyer who was arrested and detained in Libya in 2012 after being assigned by the International Criminal Court to defend Saif al-Islam Gaddafi, the son of Muammar Gaddafi.

== Early life and education ==
Taylor is from Brisbane. She graduated from the University of Queensland with an arts/law degree in 1998.

== Career ==
Taylor worked as a victims' advocate and in international criminal law. She worked as a researcher for Antonio Cassese, president of the International Criminal Tribunal for the former Yugoslavia.

Taylor helped set up the International Criminal Court's public defence counsel in 2006 and worked on defence cases before Tribunals in Yugoslavia and Rwanda. She was assigned to provide assistance to Slobodan Milošević when he refused counsel during his trial.

In 2012, Taylor was detained along with her interpreter Helen Assaf from Lebanon, Alexander Khodakov, a diplomat from Russia, and Esteban Peralta Losilla, a legal expert from Spain. They were accused of spying by carrying coded documents to Saif al-Islam Gaddafi, their client. Taylor was accused of smuggling a miniature video camera pen and watch. Taylor was arrested and although her colleagues were released, they chose to remain with her. They were detained in the Libyan town of Zintan on 7 June. It was the first time an International Criminal Court official had been seized. The president of the court, Sang-Hyun Song, demanded Taylor's immediate release, claiming she had immunity as she was on an official mission. Many diplomatic officials, including Australian Foreign Minister Bob Carr, who flew to Tripoli, lobbied for their release. In order to secure her release, the court apologised to the Libyan rebels for the incident and promised to investigate Taylor and her colleagues. They were released on 3 July and flown to Rome on a plane provided by the Italian government.

On 17 January 2013, charges of breaching national security were brought in a Zintan court against al-Islam, and against Taylor and her colleague in absentia.

In 2016, Taylor led Julian Assange's case before the UN Working Group on Arbitrary Detention and has been part of his legal team since 2014.

Taylor also advises the Working Group on Syria, Propaganda and Media and, according to The Daily Beast and New Lines Magazine in April 2021, has been in contact with one of its members, Paul McKeigue, since at least September 2019 after WikiLeaks helped him get free legal advice. According to the outlets, she sent McKeigue "legal advice memorandum" that detailed litigious claims that could be made against the Organisation for the Prohibition of Chemical Weapons (OPCW). According to emails linked in the articles, the memo led to Taylor’s husband, Geoffrey Roberts, representing former OPCW employee Brendan Whelan who criticised the group’s investigations and leaked material to WikiLeaks.

== Personal life ==
Taylor is married to Geoffrey Roberts, who is also an International Criminal Court lawyer. They live in The Hague, Netherlands.
