= Tara McCormack =

- Education: Queen Mary University of London; London School of Economics; University of Westminster
- Occupations: Author, professor
- Known for: International Relations

Tara McCormack is an academic and author. She is a lecturer in international relations at the University of Leicester.

== Education and career ==
McCormack graduated with a BA in politics from Queen Mary University of London, and an MSc in International Relations and Government from the London School of Economics. She completed her PhD in international security at the Centre for the Study of Democracy, University of Westminster. She specialises in security, foreign policy and democratic legitimacy; intervention and Britain's war powers. Before taking up her post at the University of Leicester McCormack taught at the University of Westminster and the University of Brunel.

== Views ==
McCormack has a long association with LM Magazine and its successor Spiked magazine, and with their related projects such as the Battle of Ideas.

In a 2007 article for Spiked reviewing a book by John Laughland on the Trial of Slobodan Milošević, she described the International Criminal Tribunal for the former Yugoslavia (ICTY) as practising "utter arbitrary lawlessness". The death of Milošević, in her opinion, "brought an end to the farce".

=== Syria ===
McCormack is a member of the Working Group on Syria, Propaganda and Media (SPM). In April 2018 The Times newspaper described the group as being "apologists for Assad". In response, McCormack said "What have we learnt from the air strikes? UK, US and France hold the UN Charter in contempt. They bombed on the basis of social media videos. By bombing the day the OPCW was to start work they also show contempt for this body. ... The front page of The Times was a hatchet job on me and other colleagues who are against intervention". McCormack has tweeted that Syria's civil defence volunteers, the White Helmets are "basically Al Qaeda" and "run by Jihadis".

== Selected publications ==
=== Books ===
- Critique, Security and Power. The Political Limits to Critical and Emancipatory Approaches. Routledge, London, 2009. ISBN 978-0415485401

=== Articles ===
- "Power and Agency in the Human Security Framework", Cambridge Review of International Affairs, Vol. 1, No. 21, pp. 113–128. (2008)
- "The Responsibility to Protect and the End of the Western Century", The Journal of Intervention and Statebuilding, Vol. 4 (2010), No. 1, pp. 69–82.
- "Human Security and the Separation of Security and Development", Conflict Security and Development, Vol. 11 (2011), No. 2, pp. 235–260.
- "The Domestic Limits to American International Leadership after Bush", International Politics, Vol. 48 (2011), No. 2, pp. 188–206.
- "The British National Security Strategy, Security After Representation", British Journal of Politics and International Relations. (2015)
- "The Emerging Parliamentary Convention on British Military Action and Warfare by Remote Control", The RUSI Journal, Vol. 161 (2016), No 2, pp. 22–29.
