= David Miller (sociologist) =

British sociologist

- Born: 1964 (age 61–62)
- Known for: Islamophobia in the media Propaganda studies
- Scientific career
- Workplaces: University of Strathclyde; University of Bath; University of Bristol
- Thesis: The Struggle Over, and Impact of Media Portrayals of Northern Ireland (1994)
- Doctoral advisor: Greg Philo

David Miller (born 1964) is a British broadcaster, writer, investigative researcher and former academic, whose research and publications focus on Islamophobia and propaganda. He is a non-resident Senior Research Fellow at the Center for Islam and Global Affairs at Istanbul Zaim University, Turkey. He is producer and co-host of Palestine Declassified on PressTV and co-founder and co-director of the non-profit company Public Interest Investigations (PII). Miller was Professor of Sociology at the University of Strathclyde (2004–2011) and the University of Bath (2011–2018) and was Professor of Political Sociology at the University of Bristol (2018–2021).

In 2021 Miller was dismissed by the university because of allegations from students that Miller engaged in antisemitism during one of his lectures. It was later found to constitute wrongful dismissal. Miller was cleared of any unlawful actions and in 2026, the Employment Appeal Tribunal upheld a 2024 employment tribunal finding that Miller's anti-Zionist beliefs constituted a protected philosophical belief under section 10 of the Equality Act 2010.

== Education, posts and affiliations ==
Miller earned a bachelor's degree in biological science from the University of Glasgow. In 1994 he obtained his PhD under Greg Philo, with the work being titled The Struggle Over, and Impact of, Media Portrayals of Northern Ireland. He then undertook doctoral research with the Glasgow Media Group.

Miller began his academic career as a lecturer and then reader in film and media studies at the University of Stirling, before switching to sociology. From 2004 to 2011, he was Professor of Sociology at the University of Strathclyde. He became Professor of Sociology at the University of Bath in 2011 and the University of Bristol in 2018.

From 2013 to 2016, he was a Global Uncertainties Leadership Fellow with the Research Councils UK (RCUK), where he led a project examining the function of expertise in the area of terrorism. Between 2013 and 2016, the UK Research and Innovation funding body provided Miller and his co-authors £401,552 in funding.

Miller is a director of the Organisation for Propaganda Studies and a member of the Working Group on Syria, Propaganda and Media (SPM). The SPM has received criticism for disputing the veracity of official research concerning the use of chemical weapons in the Syrian Civil War as well as for its allegations that the Syrian White Helmets have staged false flag attacks in order to trigger Western retaliation against Syria's government. In 2018. Miller co-wrote an SPM paper on the Douma chemical attack. The SPM paper concluded that the UN/OPCW Fact-Finding Mission did not reach any conclusion as to whether a chemical attack had taken place. In 2021, according to an opinion article of The Jewish Chronicle, the SPM paper said that the Syrian government had not used chemical weapons in Douma and had based its conclusions on the testimony of two former employees of the Organisation for the Prohibition of Chemical Weapons (OPCW), whose credibility was dismissed by the OPCW. The Jewish Chronicle opinion article said Miller had responded to the Jewish Chronicle that the SPM's conclusions were "totally vindicated by the subsequent information released into the public domain".

In October 2026, The Guardian reported Miller had links with Greens for Palestine.

=== Spinwatch and other websites ===
Miller is the co-founder and co-director of the non-profit company Public Interest Investigations (PII), which has two main projects, Spinwatch, a website which describes itself as being "devoted to public interest reporting on spin lobbying and political corruption", and Powerbase, a wiki that "monitors power networks and conflicts of interest". According to Jake Wallis Simons of The Jewish Chronicle, PII has received funding from MEND and the Cordoba Foundation, both of which have been accused of having Islamist connections.

SpinWatch aligns with Miller's interest in "concentrations of power in society" by examining networks which it says use "spin and deception" to "distort public debate and undermine democracy".

Miller's SpinProfiles, a project associated with Spinwatch, described itself as a collaborative "encyclopedia of people, issues, and groups shaping the public agenda" and has "close to ten thousand profiles of think tanks, lobbying organisations and those associated with them". The content of SpinProfiles, was moved to Powerbase, a new website, in 2010. According to Miller, the SpinProfiles website was taken down by the domain name registrar that summer after SpinProfiles declined to remove information about Alexander Meleagrou-Hitchens from its site. In 2010, Shiraz Maher wrote in Standpoint that SpinProfiles lacked entries on the Muslim Council of Britain (MCB) and IEngage (the name under which MEND was then known).

In 2019, the Community Security Trust lodged a complaint with Bristol University about Miller and advised and supported Bristol University Jewish Society when it made a separate complaint. In a 2021 article in the New Statesman, Dave Rich Head of Policy at the Community Security Trust, wrote that Spinwatch "echoes certain facets of anti-Semitic conspiracism". Rich also criticised a 2011 booklet co-authored by Miller, The Cold War on British Muslims, which, Rich said, claimed to reveal "for the first time the network of individuals and foundations that are bankrolling the cold war on British Muslims".

Another of Miller's websites, Neocon Europe, hosted material written by Kevin MacDonald, an American evolutionary psychologist who appeared as a witness for David Irving in his unsuccessful libel claim against Penguin Books and Deborah Lipstadt. Miller said he removed MacDonald's statements in November 2009, "as soon as I became aware that they had been posted on the site". In December 2009, Miller said: "Macdonald has been repeatedly and rightly (in our view) accused of racism. Moreover, the statements expressed core essentialist anti-semitic/racist ideas. This material should not have been posted and is in no way endorsed by this site. I apologise for, and deeply regret, this error."

== Comments while at the University of Bristol ==
=== Comments about Zionists and Israel in 2019 and 2020 ===
In 2019, Miller said that Israel was supporting interfaith events involving Muslims and Jews as a trojan horse to increase the acceptance of Zionism in the Muslim community. As an example, Miller mentioned a gathering of Muslims and Jews at the East London Mosque.

Sabrina Miller, who was the Campaigns Officer of Bristol's Jewish student society (JSoc), and who had campaigned to have David Miller sacked from Bristol University, wrote a number of articles about Miller. According to Sabrina Miller, in 2019 JSoc made a complaint to Bristol University about Miller's "Harms of the Powerful" lecture module. Miller used a PowerPoint slide during one lecture, which he had created in 2013, aiming to demonstrate the existence of a Zionist network in Britain. In September 2019, The Telegraph wrote that "while there is no suggestion of anti-Semitism", Miller's lecture had reminded students of "anti-Semitic language, tropes and conspiracy theories". Dave Rich said that individuals listed on the slide had either changed posts or died in the intervening period. Miller said "I don't teach conspiracy theories of any sort" and that it is "simply a matter of fact" that "parts of the Zionist movement are involved in funding Islamophobia." The complaint by JSoc was rejected by the university because Miller's lecture did not contain any material that was hostile to Jews and therefore could not be considered as antisemitic.

On 20 May 2020, Miller was suspended as a member of the Labour Party, and resigned the following month, after accusing Labour leader Keir Starmer of taking money from "the Zionist movement". That month, Miller said the "targeted harassment" of him and other socialist members confirmed "the degree of influence that Zionist advocates and lobbyists for Israel have over disciplinary processes and Party policy."

In an online public forum on 29 July 2020, Miller said: "The Zionist movement, and the Israeli government, are the enemy of the left, the enemy of world peace, and they must be directly targeted."

=== Comments about Jewish students, Israel, and Zionism in 2021 ===
==== Jewish students ====
Bristol University's Jewish Society (JSoc) said their members had been abused after being singled out as "part of the UJS which is a direct member of the World Zionist Organization." According to Sabrina Miller, around the same time, in an interview with the anti-Zionist publication Electronic Intifada, Miller said the university's JSoc and the Union of Jewish Students (UJS), with which it is affiliated, had created a "charade of false antisemitism allegations." In a statement, Bristol University said it did "not endorse the comments made by Professor David Miller about our Jewish students," and that "we must balance the rights and often wide-ranging views of students and staff with institutional policies and national law concerning academic freedom and freedom of speech."

On 23 February, Daniel Finkelstein, in a column for The Times, wrote that "waywardness has a place in academic life" and he was sceptical of the merits of "cancel culture." The issue convincing Finkelstein that Miller should be removed from his post was his "attack [on] the Bristol University Jewish Society — proper, actual students at his own university — as being part of a co-ordinated campaign of censorship directed by the state of Israel." Miller had previously told The Jewish Chronicle that "There is a real question of abuse here — of Jewish students on British campuses being used as political pawns by a violent, racist foreign regime engaged in ethnic cleansing. The UJS’ lobbying for Israel is a threat to the safety of Arab and Muslim students as well as of Jewish students and indeed of all critics of Israel."

In March, the All-Party Parliamentary Group against Antisemitism (APPGAA) accused Miller of "inciting hatred against Jewish students."

==== Israel and Zionism ====
In a 19 February letter, Marie van der Zyl, President of the Board of Deputies of British Jews, said Miller's "increasingly hysterical attacks on British Jewish organisations are now raising the prospect of real physical harm." She said she was responding to his "attacks against the UK's Jewish community, Jewish communal organisations and Jewish students, which one might charitably describe as completely deranged" and alleged he had a "particular obsession" with the Community Security Trust which Miller said "should be under investigation for its ties with the State of Israel."

On 28 February, Malia Bouattia, the former President of the UK National Union of Students, supported Miller in an opinion piece for Al Jazeera: "The accusations of 'anti-Semitism' levelled at him arise from a lecture he gave on the Zionist movement's involvement in promoting Islamophobia, a well-known fact among scholars who study the Palestinian question." According to the Jewish Chronicle, Iranian-backed Press TV wrote that there was a "concerted campaign against Professor Miller" and "intense activity by the Zionist lobby across the length and breadth of the British political landscape."

On 4 March 2021, historian David Feldman wrote that Miller's work on Israel and Zionism was in the tradition of "conspiracy theorists [who] have pointed to Jews as the malign force driving the modern world."

In early March 2021, The Times reported Miller had been accused by the APPGAA of antisemitism. He had called for the "end of Zionism," and said Israel is "trying to exert its will all over the world."

== Investigation and termination of employment ==
=== Investigation and reactions ===
On 17 March, the university said that it had begun an investigation of Miller. In March 2021, Avon and Somerset Police said that it had opened an investigation to determine whether any hate crimes had occurred. Nothing further came from the police investigation. In April 2021, 550 academics, including Simon Schama and Simon Sebag Montefiore, signed a letter condemning Miller's statements the previous February. Thangam Debbonaire, whose constituency includes the University of Bristol, also denounced the comments Miller made.

In response to his sacking, a Change.org petition was set up, gaining almost 40,000 signatures in support of Miller and an open letter to the university was signed by hundreds of public intellectuals and academics, including high-profile figures such as Noam Chomsky and Judith Butler as well as several dozen Bristol University academics, demanding his reinstatement. This stated that "Professor Miller is an eminent scholar, is known internationally for exposing the role that powerful actors and well-resourced, co-ordinated networks play in manipulating and stage-managing public debates, including on racism."

A separate letter, signed by hundreds of Jewish supporters of Miller, stated that "Jewish opinion on Zionism has always been diverse" and that the attacks on Miller will "chill free speech on Israel if left unchallenged".

=== Employment termination ===
The University of Bristol terminated Miller's employment "with immediate effect" on 1 October 2021. In a statement, the institution said Miller "did not meet the standards of behaviour we expect from our staff". The university disciplinary hearing included a third-party investigation by a Queen's Counsel who found Miller's comments "did not constitute unlawful speech". The precise reasons for the university's conclusion were confidential but The Guardian reported they are understood not to cover the content of lectures. The university statement cited its "duty of care to all students and the wider University community" and observed the need to "apply its own codes of conduct".

==== Aftermath ====
In his immediate response to his termination, Miller said the university "has embarrassed itself and the entire British academic sector by capitulating to a pressure campaign against me overseen and directed by a hostile foreign government." Miller said he intended to appeal against the university's decision, possibly leading to an employment tribunal. The Bristol Post reported on 6 December 2021 that "Details regarding Prof Miller's appeal hearing, taking place this week, remain confidential."

On 29 November 2021, Middle East Monitor reported that a leaked second QC's report "commissioned specifically to investigate a public talk that Miller gave in February and an article that he wrote for Ali Abunimah's Electronic Intifada a week later", as one of five elements in the university's wider investigation of the case, concludes that "there is no formal case to answer against Professor Miller" and that he had not "exceeded the boundaries of acceptable speech." The QC also concluded that the article was not antisemitic as "defined to include the manifestation of hatred, discrimination, prejudice or hostility against Jews as Jews, or Jewish institutions as Jewish institutions." Jewish Voice for Labour made a copy of the second report available. The Bristol Post stated that Miller's sacking came after a disciplinary hearing and two internal investigations that found his comments did not constitute unlawful speech.

== Employment tribunal ==
In 2023, Miller commenced employment tribunal proceedings, claiming "unfair dismissal, breach of contract and discrimination or victimisation on grounds of religion or belief."

On 5 February 2024, an employment tribunal found that Miller was unfairly dismissed and subjected to discrimination because his "anti-Zionist beliefs qualified as a philosophical belief and as a protected characteristic pursuant to section 10 Equality Act 2010". A statement from his solicitors said that Miller "successfully claimed discrimination based on his philosophical belief that Zionism is inherently racist, imperialist, and colonial, a protected characteristic under the Equality Act 2010, alongside a finding of unfair dismissal. This judgement establishes for the first time ever that anti-Zionist beliefs are protected in the workplace."

The judgement said that there was a thirty percent chance that he would have been sacked for additional social media comments he made two months later, if he had still been employed. Miller said he would seek "maximum compensation". The tribunal said any award would be reduced by half "because the claimant’s dismissal was caused or contributed to by his own actions". The full judgment was published in October 2024. Compensation will be decided at a later hearing.

In August 2026, the Employment Appeal Tribunal (EAT) dismissed the University of Bristol’s appeal, upholding the earlier employment tribunal finding that Dr David Miller’s anti-Zionist beliefs constituted a protected philosophical belief under section 10 of the Equality Act 2010. The EAT considered claims arising from Miller’s dismissal from the University of Bristol and confirmed that the tribunal had been entitled to treat his stated beliefs as protected under equality law.

== Counter-terrorism detention ==
In February 2025 Miller attended the funeral of Hassan Nasrallah in Lebanon. After his return from Beirut Miller was detained by British counter-terrorism police under Schedule 7 of the Terrorism Act 2000 at Heathrow Airport. Several groups called for his arrest including Conservative Shadow Lord Chancellor Robert Jenrick. After the detention, while police had made no arrests, Miller said "It was a sign of the way policing operates under immense pressure from Zionist groups".

== Selected publications ==
- Don't Mention the War Northern Ireland, Propaganda and the Media (Pluto Press, 1994)
- The Circuit of Mass Communication: Media Strategies, Representation and Audience Reception in the AIDS Crisis (Sage, 1998)
- Thinker, Faker, Spinner, Spy: Corporate PR and the Assault on Democracy (Pluto Press, 2007)
- A Century of Spin: How Public Relations Became the Cutting Edge of Corporate Power (Pluto Press, 2008)
- The five pillars of Islamophobia. Vague categories like ‘extremist’ and ‘radicalisation’ are trawling Muslims in a very large ‘counter-terrorism’ net. Tom Mills, Narzanin Massoumi, Hilary Aked (OpenDemocracy, 2015)
- What is Islamophobia?: Racism, Social Movements and the State, Narzanin Massoumi, Tom Mills, David Miller (Pluto Press, 2017)
- Bad News for Labour: Antisemitism, the Party and Public Belief, Greg Philo, Mike Berry, Justin Schlosberg, Antony Lerman, David Miller (Pluto Press, 2019)
