= Working Group on Syria, Propaganda and Media =

Academic group researching Syrian War propaganda

The Working Group on Syria, Propaganda and Media (SPM) is a controversial group of academics and activists whose stated purpose is to study propaganda and information operations surrounding the Syrian civil war. It was formed by environmental political theory professor Tim Hayward and former academic Piers Robinson in 2017.

== Activities ==
The group has gained attention and attracted criticism for disputing the veracity of the use of chemical weapons in the Syrian Civil War as well as for its claims that the Syrian White Helmets civil defence organisation has staged false flag attacks in order to trigger Western retaliation against the Syrian government.

The group has produced a number of reports. The SPM's first publication, entitled, "Doubts about 'Novichoks'", questioned whether Russia's secret nerve agent programme – through which Novichok chemical weapons were developed – had ever existed.

Malcolm Brabant has stated that in subsequent publications, the SPM has argued that the 2018 Douma chemical attack was faked by the White Helmets civil defence organisation. The SPM report accused Hamish de Bretton-Gordon, the former head of Britain's Joint Chemical, Biological, Radiological and Nuclear Regiment, of being an agent working on behalf of a British covert influence programme.

According to Bellingcat, the group used other entities such as Berlin Group 21 (BG21) as their front for publishing "statements of concern". In October 2019, a former Organisation for the Prohibition of Chemical Weapons (OPCW) employee later identified as Brendan Whelan presented his dissent with the OPCW's findings about the investigation of the Douma chemical attack. Members of the Courage Foundation who attended included Kristinn Hrafnsson, Jose Bustani, Helmut Lohre and Gunter Meyer. Courage Foundation published the Statement of Concern at the same time as "Berlin Group 21". Whelan later leaked OPCW documents to WikiLeaks.

== Controversies ==
In early 2018, The Times newspaper ran a series of articles critical of the SPM, in which it said the group intentionally spreads "disinformation" in support of the government of Bashar al-Assad in the Syrian Civil War and "conspiracy theories promoted by Russia". The Times described the group's members as "apologists for Assad" and likened them to Holocaust deniers. In response, the SPM said that its members have a shared interest in "investigating the 'information operations' (...) associated with the Syrian conflict" and stressed that "the Working Group does not take any position for or against the Syrian government."

A March 2018 BBC News article stated that the SPM had, "echoed [...] Russian disinformation narratives," in a number of publications by suggesting that the governments of the United States and United Kingdom had a motive to kill Russian dissident Sergei Skripal in order to prevent him from testifying in a libel case against former British intelligence agent Christopher Steele. The view of the UK government is that Skripal, a former Russian spy, was poisoned by Russian secret service agents.

In 2019, The Huffington Post wrote that SPM "reported on the poisoning of Sergei Skripal, chemical attacks in Syria and a British organisation that counters Russian propaganda but its findings have been described by experts as “speculation”, “distortion” and “in the realm of conspiracy theorists”". It quoted Kristyan Benedict, a crisis response manager for Amnesty International UK, who accused SPM of promoting conspiracy theories and denying war crimes. It also noticed that SPM cofounder Piers Robinson is a 9/11 truther.

In 2021, Commission for International Justice and Accountability (CIJA) reported on its sting operation targeting SPM member Paul McKeigue, in which CIJA posed over email as a Russian agent named "Ivan." McKeigue corresponded with "Ivan" over the course of several months, believing that he was communicating with Russian secret services. According to CIJA, SPM attempted to coordinate with Russian diplomats including Alexander Shulgin, Russia's ambassador to the Netherlands, on publications about Syria. The report also stated that McKeigue obtained legal advice from Melinda Taylor, one of Wikileaks founder Julian Assange's personal lawyers, on how to make litigious claims against the OPCW which McKeigue referred to as "lawfare", a term generally used to describe frivolous or harassing litigation. McKeigue and Taylor also discussed promoting claims of fraud against CIJA.

According to CIJA, its "investigation revealed that, far from being fringe conspiracists, these revisionists, employed by some of the UK’s top universities, were collaborating with Russian diplomats in four countries; were willing to co-operate with presumed Russian security agents to advance their agenda and to attack their opponents; were co-ordinating dissemination of disinformation with bloggers, alternative media and Russian state media; appeared to be planning the doxxing of survivors of chemical attacks; and admitted to making up sources and facts when necessary to advance their cause."

== Members ==
Members of the SPM include:

- Tim Hayward, environmental political theory professor, University of Edinburgh
- Piers Robinson, former academic
- Michael Kobs (Independent Researcher)
- Adam Larson (Independent Researcher)
- David Miller, sociologist, University of Bristol
- Paul McKeigue, genetic epidemiology and statistical genetics professor
- Jan Oberg, Transnational Foundation for Peace and Future Research
- Vanessa Beeley, activist and blogger
- Tara McCormack, international relations lecturer, University of Leicester
- Oliver Boyd-Barrett, professor emeritus, Bowling Green State University
- Carmen Renieri (Independent Researcher)
- Greg Simons, lecturer, Institute for Russian and Eurasian Studies, Uppsala University
- Florian Zollmann, Newcastle University

Members of its advisory board have included:

- Mark Crispin Miller, professor of media studies, New York University.
- Philip Hammond, professor of media & communications, London South Bank University.
