= Translational Neurodegeneration =

- Discipline: Neurology
- Language: English
- Edited by: Shengdi Chen

Publication details
- History: 2012-present
- Publisher: BioMed Central
- Open access: Yes
- License: CC BY

Standard abbreviations
- ISO 4: Transl. Neurodegener.

Indexing
- ISSN: 2047-9158
- LCCN: TNREAP
- OCLC no.: 779541310

Links
- Journal homepage; Online archive

Translational Neurodegeneration is a peer-reviewed, medical journal covering the field of neurodegenerative diseases, such as Parkinson's and Alzheimer's disease. It was established in 2012 and is published by BioMed Central. The editor-in-chief is Shengdi Chen (School of Medicine, Shanghai Jiao Tong University).

== Abstracting and indexing ==
The journal is abstracted and indexed in Chemical Abstracts Service and Scopus.
