= CNN effect =

Theory in political science and media studies

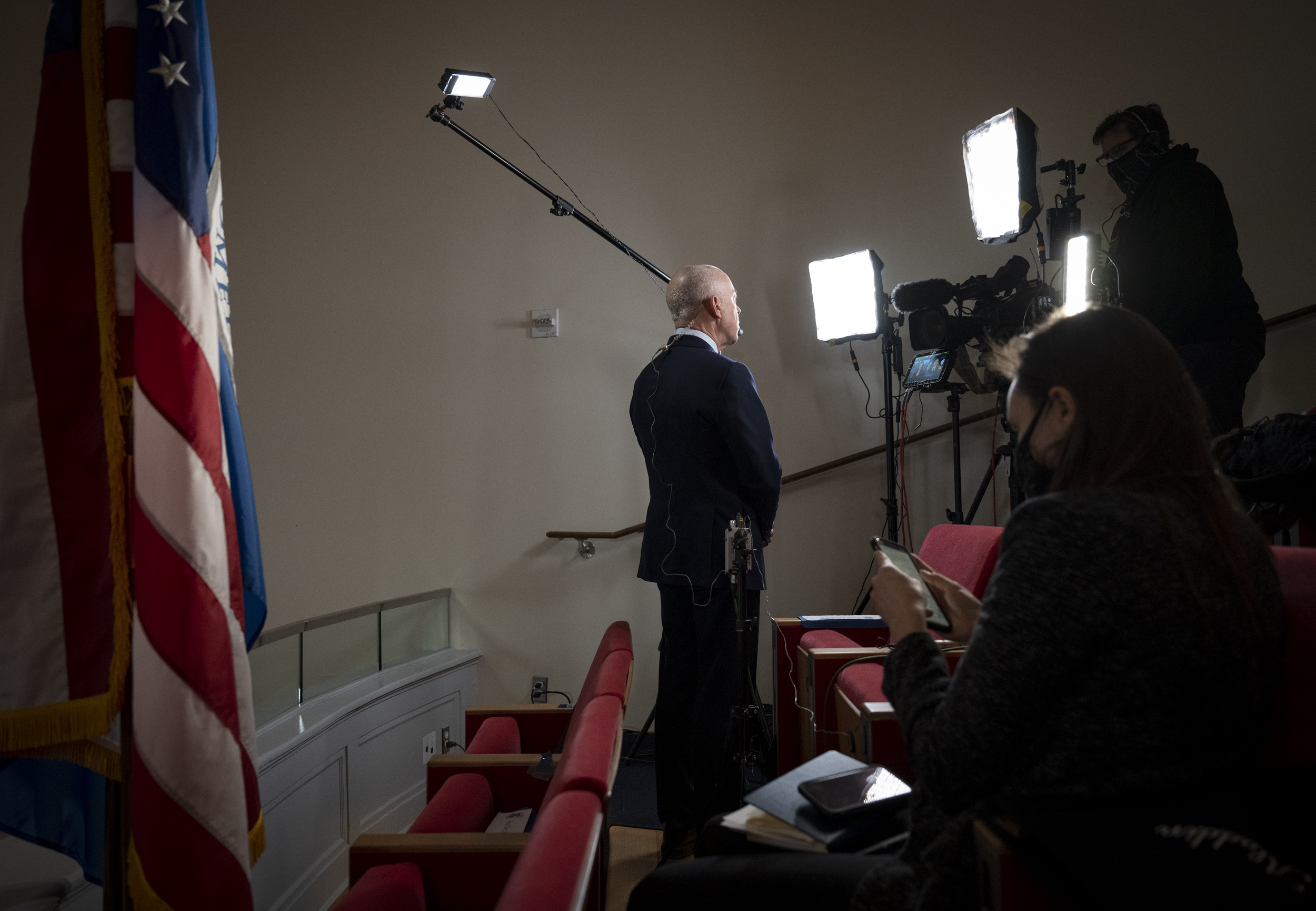
United States Secretary of Homeland Security Alejandro Mayorkas being interviewed by CNN in 2021

The CNN effect is a theory in political science and media studies which states that global television networks, in their modern ability to provide live, 24-hours news coverage from anywhere in the world, play a significant role in determining the actions policymakers take and the outcomes of events.

== History ==
The 24-hour international television news channel CNN came to prominence for its use of live satellite broadcast, first in its coverage of the Space Shuttle Challenger disaster in 1986, and then in its coverage of the rescue of Jessica McClure, a Texan toddler who fell down a well in 1987. However, it was CNN's live coverage from within Iraq during the 1990-1991 Gulf War that made them a household name and allegedly changed the public's relation to war, because it brought the events and footage of the war to domestic television screens without delay (unlike Vietnam, the first 'Television War', in which film had to be physically transported home before broadcast).

While the free press has, in its role as the "Fourth Estate", always had an influence on policy-making in representative democracies, proponents of the CNN effect argue that the extent, depth, and speed of the new global media have created a new species of effects qualitatively different from those that preceded them. Of particular importance is the global coverage of events, such as the Tiananmen Square protests of 1989, the fall of Communism in eastern Europe, the first Gulf War, and the Battle of Mogadishu; these demonstrate the ability of TV news to bring images and issues from far-flung places to the forefront of American political consciousness. Additionally, the CNN effect has been cited as the driving force behind the U.S. intervention in the Kurdish crisis and the use of force by the U.S. Army during the Bosnia war of 1992–1995.

== Research ==
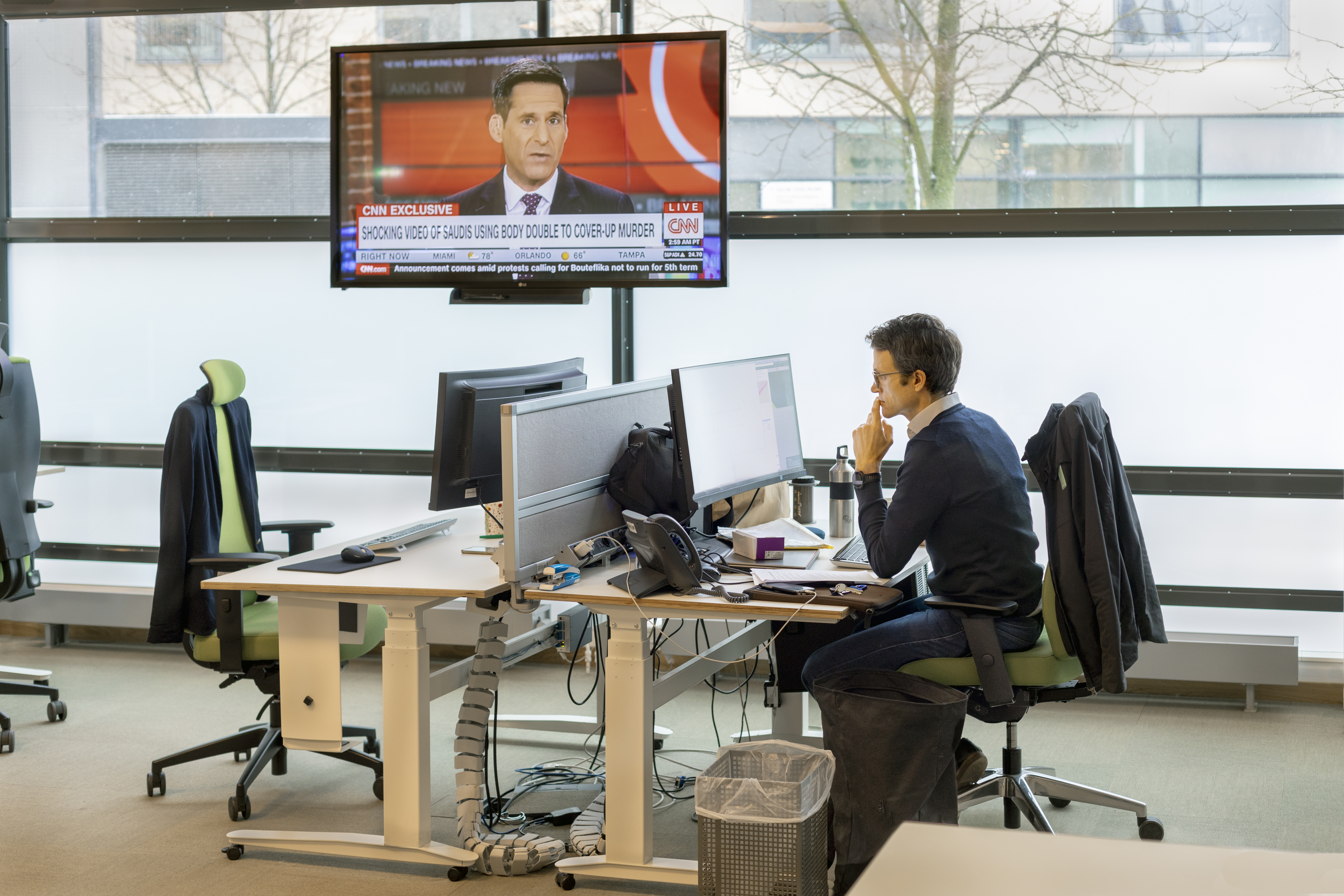
A CNN news broadcast being shown on a screen at the European Union's Centre for Disease Prevention and Control

In his research paper Clarifying the CNN Effect: An examination of Media Effects According to Type of Military Intervention, George Washington University professor Steven Livingston identifies three distinct aspects that fall under the broad term of the CNN effect. The media may function alternately or simultaneously as:

(1) a policy agenda-setting agent, (2) an impediment to the achievement of desired policy goals, (3) an accelerant to policy decision-making. (Italics in original). and (4) one of the common grounds of CNN effect is policy uncertainty; as policy certainty reduces, media influence increases and vice versa.

By focusing instantaneous and ongoing media coverage on a particular conflict, international incident, or diplomatic initiative, the news cycle effectively demands political attention, as governing politicians attempt to demonstrate that they are "on top of" current issues. The effect has been, according to Margaret Belknap, that "[t]he advent of real time news coverage has led to immediate public awareness and scrutiny of strategic decisions and military operations as they unfold". Deeper penetration and wider broadcast of statements and actions by public figures may increase transparency, but it can also complicate sensitive diplomatic relationships between states or force an official reaction from governments that would otherwise prefer to minimize political risk by remaining noncommittal. The information revolution and spread of global mass media through the Internet and international 24-hour news thus accelerates the policy-making process, requiring a faster tempo of decision and action to forestall the appearance of a leadership vacuum.

Piers Robinson , a British academic researcher in the field of media studies, also a co-director of the Organisation for Propaganda Studies and founder of the Working Group on Syria, Propaganda and Media (SPM), has authored a number of publications on the CNN effect. In his 2002 book, The CNN Effect: The Myth of News, Foreign Policy and Intervention, he argued that "sympathetic news coverage at key moments in foreign crises can influence the response of Western governments." In Robinson's framework, which focused on "the type of media coverage a crisis attracts and on level of policy certainty within the establishment in relation to the crisis", a strong CNN effect requires two conditions: 1) media coverage that is highly critical of national policy, while simultaneously emphatically reporting on civilians and refugees, and 2) policy makers in a state of indecision with no clear policy regarding use of force. In terms of this framework, Robinson characterised the 1994 NATO intervention in Bosnia that followed the siege of Goražde as exemplifying a strong CNN effect. If either condition is missing, influence on policy makers' attitudes is likely to be weak.

Former Secretary of State James Baker said of the CNN effect: "The one thing it does, is to drive policymakers to have a policy position. I would have to articulate it very quickly. You are in real-time mode. You don't have time to reflect." His former press secretary Margaret Tutwiler mirrors his sentiment: "Time for reaction is compressed. Analysis and intelligence gathering is out."

== In natural disasters ==
While the CNN effect most commonly refers to the effect that news media have on politics and government during political conflict, its effect on decisions made during natural disasters is also noteworthy. As videos and images are broadcast worldwide immediately after or even during natural disasters, these images may convince the public to donate money or pressure governments for immediate action.

The CNN effect may have played a role in increasing aid following the Asian tsunami (2004), the Kashmir earthquake (2005), Hurricane Katrina (2005), and the Sichuan earthquake in China (2008). Following the Asian tsunami, for instance, the media "blitz" that followed this natural disaster may have helped prompt an unprecedented outpouring of donations. "By February 2005, the international community had donated $500 per person affected by the tsunami, compared to just 50 cents for each person affected by Uganda’s 18-year war."

== See also ==
- Al Jazeera effect
- Broadcast journalism
- News broadcasting
- Media circus
- Media event
- Media scrum
- Sensationalism
- Slashdot effect
- Television news
- Trial by media
- Yellow journalism
