= Okinawa Christian University =

Private university in Nishihara, Okinawa, Japan

- 沖縄キリスト教学院大学
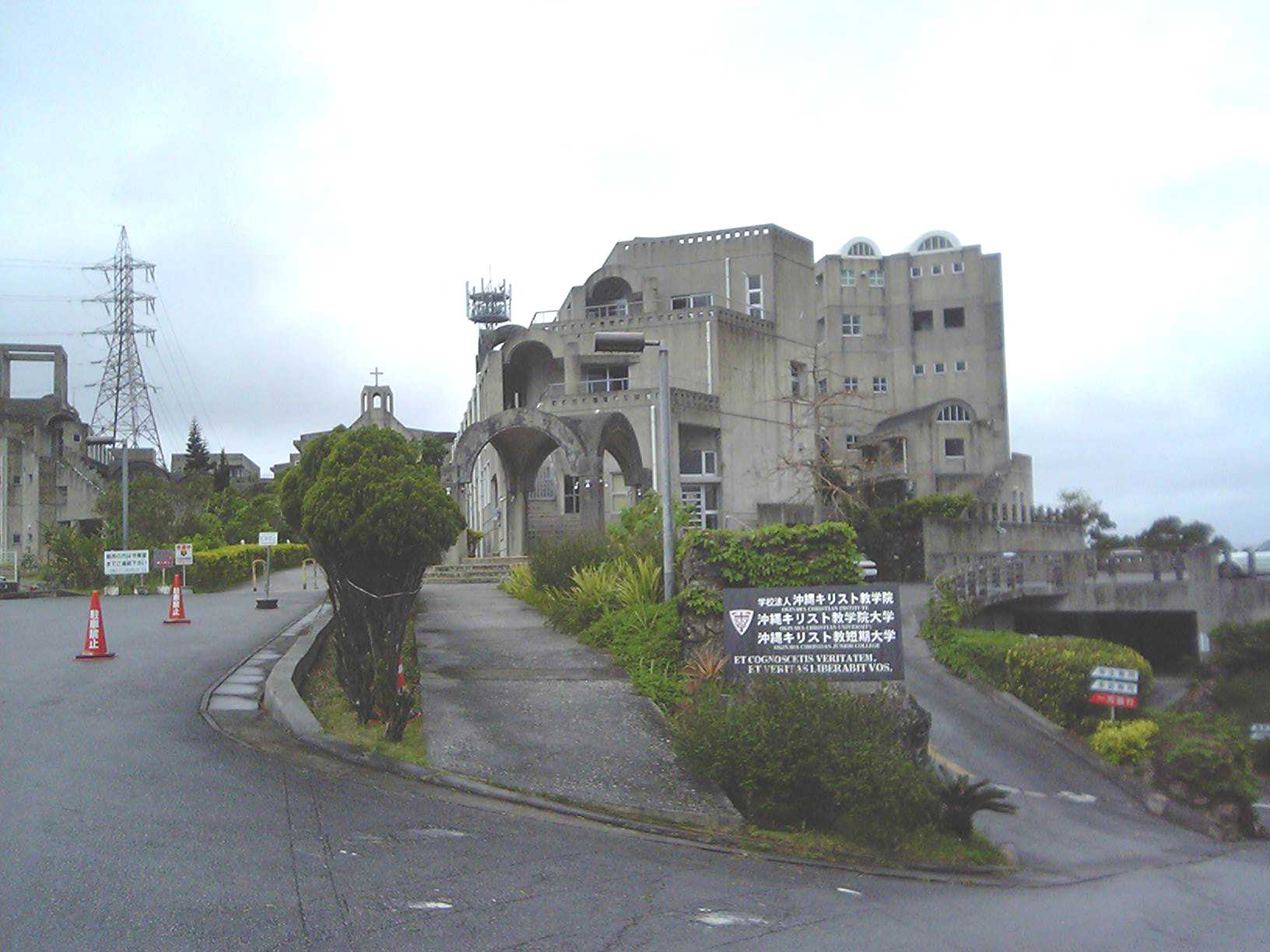
- Established: 2004; 22 years ago
- Religious affiliation: Protestantism
- Location: 777 Onaga, Nishihara, Nakagami District, Okinawa, Okinawa Prefecture, 903-0207, Japan; 26.2382°N 127.7559°E
- Website: www.ocjc.ac.jp/index_eng.html

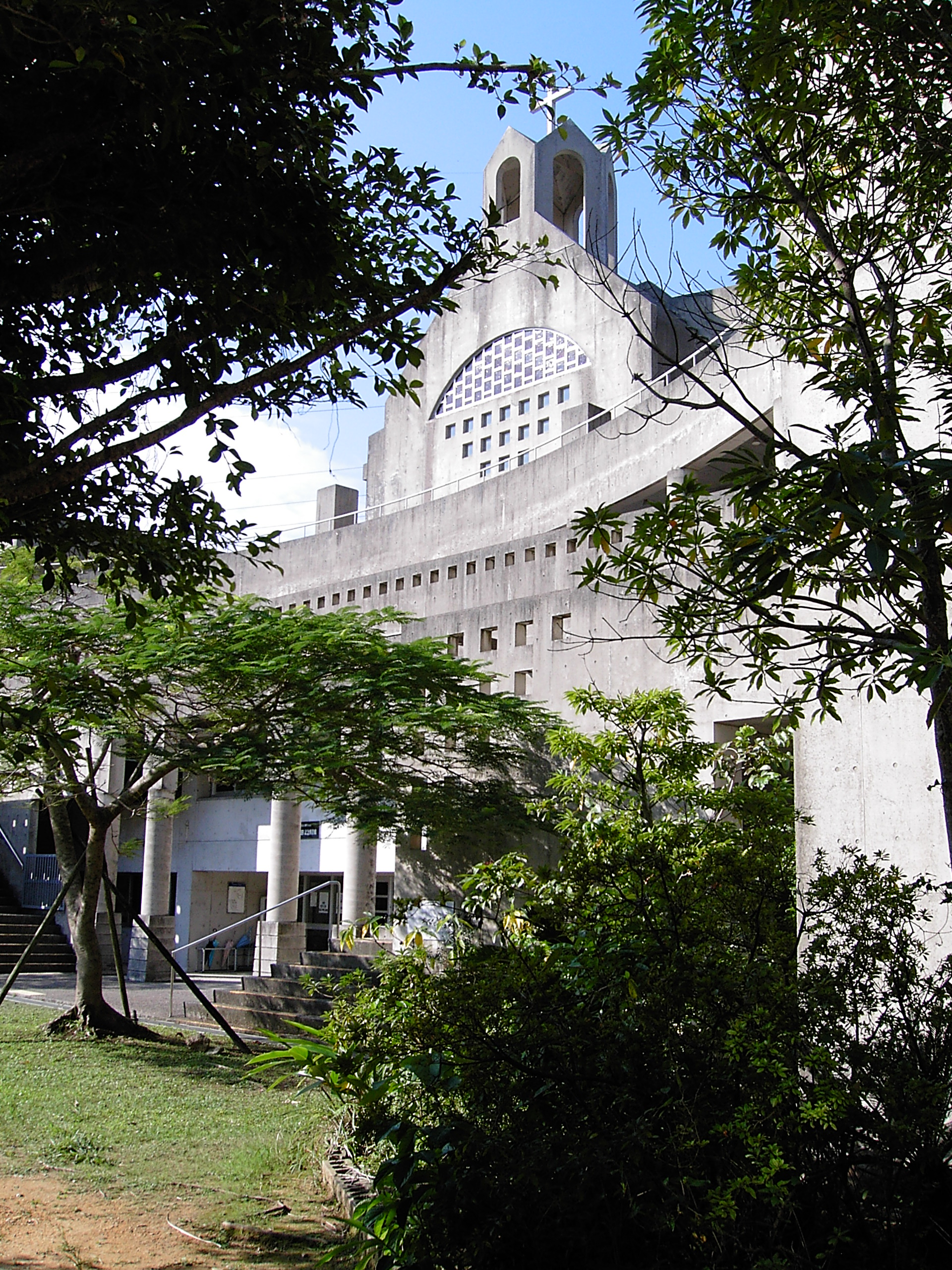
View of the courtyard

Okinawa Christian University (沖縄キリスト教学院大学, Okinawa kirisutokyō gakuin daigaku) is a private university in Nishihara, Okinawa, Japan, established in 2004. Its parent body is the Okinawa Christian Institute.
