= Philip Seib =

American journalist and professor

Philip M. Seib
- Occupations: Journalist, academic
- Employer: University of Southern California

Philip M. Seib is an American journalist. He is professor emeritus of journalism, public diplomacy, and international relations at the University of Southern California. He was the director of the university's Center on Public Diplomacy from 2009 until 2013. He was the Vice Dean of the USC Annenberg School for Communication and Journalism from 2015 until 2016.

== Books ==
- The Future of Diplomacy (Wiley, 2016)ISBN 978-1509507207
- Headline Diplomacy: How News Coverage Affects Foreign Policy (1996) ISBN 9780275953744
- The Global Journalist: News and Conscience in a World of Conflict(December 11, 2011) ISBN 978-0742511026
- Broadcasts from the Blitz: How Edward R. Murrow Helped Lead America into War (April 1, 2006) ISBN 978-1597970129
- Beyond the Front Lines: How the News Media Cover a World Shaped by War(January 1, 2004) ISBN 978-1403965479
- New Media and the Middle East (September 205, 2007) ISBN 978-1403979735
- The Al Jazeera Effect (September 1, 2008) ISBN 978-1597972000
- Toward a New Public Diplomacy: Redirecting U.S. Foreign Policy (October 20, 2009) ISBN 978-0230617445
- Real-Time Diplomacy: Politics and Power in the Social Media Era (May 14, 2012) ISBN 978-0230339439
