= Tim Hayward (political scientist) =

British academic (born 1955)

Tim Hayward (born 1955) is Professor of Environmental Political Theory at the University of Edinburgh in Scotland and director of the university's Just World Institute, a body set up to "foster interdisciplinary research into the global challenges facing the international order, with particular attention to issues of ethics and justice". Between 1995 and 2017, Hayward published four books on ecological values, human rights and political theory. Hayward has allegedly spread propaganda to his students, supporting Putin's Russia and Bashar al-Assad's Syrian regime.

Writing in Contemporary Political Theory, Anahí Wiedenbrüg wrote that Hayward's book Global Justice and Finance, published in 2019, "is a wakeup call for all those working in contemporary, normative, liberal political theory. His general normative outlook gets very uncomfortable for the political liberals working within the global justice tradition". According to John O’Neill, the book "is particularly strong in its criticisms of approaches to global justice that simply take the transfer of money and finance to be adequate responses to the problems of global justice without examination of the background nature of the institutions of global finance".

In 2017, he co-founded the Working Group on Syria, Propaganda and Media (SPM), a group whose stated purpose is to "facilitate research into the areas of organised persuasive communication (including propaganda and information operations) and media coverage, with respect to the 2011-present conflict in Syria including related topics". The group's publications have attracted criticism and accusations of bias.

According to The Times, in April 2020 Hayward "retweeted to his 13,000 followers a Canadian environmentalist's claim that the WEF, United Nations and Imperial College London might be part of a scheme to exploit the [COVID-19] pandemic by promoting vaccines and creating genemodified flu-resistant chickens".

In March 2022, the chair of the British parliament's Education Select Committee, Robert Halfon, spoke in the House of Commons about "pro-Putinist propaganda at some of our leading universities", citing Hayward amongst several other academics. Along with the comment "As long as we’re still able to hear two sides of the story we should continue striving to do so", Hayward had previously shared a tweet from a Russian representative to the United Nations describing the Mariupol hospital airstrike as "fake news".

According to the BBC, students have accused him of “sharing Russia war lies” and conspiracy theories about the Syrian war. A Ukrainian student “told the BBC she was distressed by Prof Hayward's recent tweets.”

== Selected publications ==
- Ecological Thought: An Introduction. John Wiley & Sons, 1995. ISBN 978-0-74-561320-8.
- Political Theory and Ecological Values. John Wiley & Sons, 1998. ISBN 978-0-74-561809-8.
- Constitutional Environmental Rights. Oxford University Press, 2005. ISBN 978-0-19-927867-1.
- Human Rights and the Environment. 4 Vols. Routledge, 2017. (Editor)
- Global Justice and Finance. Oxford University Press, 2019. ISBN 978-0-19-884276-7.
