= Matti Sällberg =

Matti Sällberg (born 31 March 1961) is a Swedish dentist, professor and biomedical analyst at the Department of Laboratory Medicine at the Karolinska Institute.

== Career ==
Sällberg became the first professor in Sweden in biomedical analysis in December 2000.

He leads a research team at the Karolinska Institute for research into a COVID-19 vaccine in the "OpenCorona" project. In September 2020, the vaccine under development was named OC-007.

Sällberg is a partner in the company Svenska Vaccinfabriken Produktion AB.
