= Serena Shim Award for Uncompromised Integrity in Journalism =

Journalism award

The Serena Shim Award for Uncompromised Integrity in Journalism was established in 2019 to honor Serena Shim, an American journalist who died in a car crash in 2014. It honors journalists "who continue to tell challenging truths in difficult times".

Shim had worked for the Iranian state news outlet PressTV. Funded by the Association for Investment in Popular Action Committees and private donations, the Serena Shim Award has come under question by New Lines Magazine for its independence from the former Bashar al-Assad regime in Syria and pro-Kremlin propaganda by supporting bloggers on the left and right of the political media landscape.

== Funding ==
The Award comes with a cash prize of around 5,000 US Dollars with the value of total prizes awarded to 2021 estimated at over a quarter million dollars. While funding sources are not disclosed, investigations have revealed close ties to the Association for Investment in Popular Action Committees. Researchers from Bellingcat found that the Serena Shim Award and Association share the same web servers. Further tax records to awardees list Association for Investment in Popular Action Committees as the source of income.

== Notable award holders ==
A full list of laureates can be found on the Serena Shim Award website. Some notable award holders are listed below.

- Alastair Crooke
- Gareth Porter
- Max Blumenthal
- Julian Assange
- George Galloway
- Jimmy Dore
- Eva Bartlett
- Rania Khalek
- Ajamu Baraka
- MintPress News
- John Pilger
- Black Agenda Report
- SouthFront
- Venezuelanalysis
- Belén Fernández
- Antiwar.com
- Scott Ritter
- Alina Lipp
- Jackson Hinkle
- Dan Kovalik
- Ajit Singh
- Consortium News
- Richard Medhurst
- Glen Ford
- The Grayzone
- Aaron Maté
- Dan Cohen
- Vanessa Beeley
- Whitney Webb
