= American Herald Tribune =

Allegedly Iranian-linked news website

- Company type: State-run media
- Website type: News website, fake news website
- Available in: English
- Founded: 2015; 11 years ago
- Headquarters: United States, Canada
- Country of origin: Iran
- Founder: Anthony Hall
- Editors: Tim King, Eric Zuesse, Anthony Hall, Vanessa Beeley, Ramzy Baroud
- Employees: 200
- Website: ahtribune.com (dead) ahtribune.com (archived)
- Current status: Inactive

The American Herald Tribune (AHT) was an English-language news website of unknown origins established in 2015. Its reported founder and editor-in-chief was Anthony Hall, a Canadian professor and conspiracy theorist. On 4 November 2020, the United States Department of Justice seized the website’s domain, alleging that it was operated by the Government of Iran as part of a state-backed disinformation campaign targeting American audiences.

The website presented itself as an independent, legitimate news outlet but reportedly paid U.S. citizens to produce content supportive of the Iranian government’s political positions. These articles were later republished in Iranian state media to give the impression that Iranian policies had popular support in the United States. At the time of its shutdown, AHT reportedly listed around 200 contributors.

== History ==
=== Origins ===
The American Herald Tribune was launched in 2015 and described itself as a "genuinely independent online media outlet". It said it was funded by online advertisement revenue, individual donors, and foundations. The website published news in English and paid U.S. citizens to contribute articles. The tone of the website's articles usually corresponded to the political positions of the Iranian government; they criticized the foreign policy of the US, Israel and president Donald Trump. One of the website's editors, Tim King, said it was run by a Brazilian named "Sam", but the website's records showed it was registered in Sam's name. The email address used to register the site belonged to economist Paul Craig Roberts, but he denied knowing anything about the email.

Reports identified Canadian academic Anthony J. Hall as a central figure associated with American Herald Tribune during this period. Hall taught Native American studies, liberal education and globalization at the University of Lethbridge. Hall drew public controversy for denying the Holocaust and promoting 9/11 conspiracy theories, and was suspended from his job in 2016 by the University of Lethbridge. He was reinstated to his position in November 2017, and he retired in 2018.

=== Website ===
The website maintained social-media accounts until the major platforms disabled them for coordinated inauthentic behavior. In 2018, Facebook removed the page for allegedly being affiliated with an Iranian government-backed network of fake news organizations. Google suspended associated Gmail and Google Ads accounts under the same policy. AHT’s administrators responded by asserting that “alternative media [was] under attack” and accused the companies of serving as “vehicles for U.S. government censorship and Western propaganda". The cybersecurity firm FireEye was credited for helping the operation. One employee interviewed by CNN said the company linked AHT to the network because "both technical and behavioral" signs linked it to Iran. Despite the terminations, the American Herald Tribune website remained active and still had an active Twitter account that was terminated in 2020, following a report by CNN Business.

The American Herald Tribune website was hosted on "ahtribune.com". The site organized its content under multiple news categories; "World", "US", "In Depth", "Opinion", "Politics", "Religion", "History", "Human Rights", and "Youth". The website's editorial stance included opinions expressing support for Hezbollah and antisemitism, as well as hostility towards the United States and Israel. On October 19, 2020, the website's main topics were COVID-19, "#IsraelGate" and Palestine. During the 2020 US presidential election, the website reported that its candidates were "pro-Zionist" and that the election was vulnerable to being manipulated by foreign actors. The website's editor section listed 200 people. The FBI noted that some of these editors were unaware of the website's ties to Iran. On January 31, 2020, editorial board of The Washington Post explained how the website operated. It described the website's practices as "online disinformation" and said it targeted American citizens sympathetic to Iran, who usually wrote for unreliable or propagandistic websites, and paid them money to write articles for the website. The purpose of this was for Iranian state media to subsequently cite these articles as "examples" of American people's support for the Iranian government's political positions.

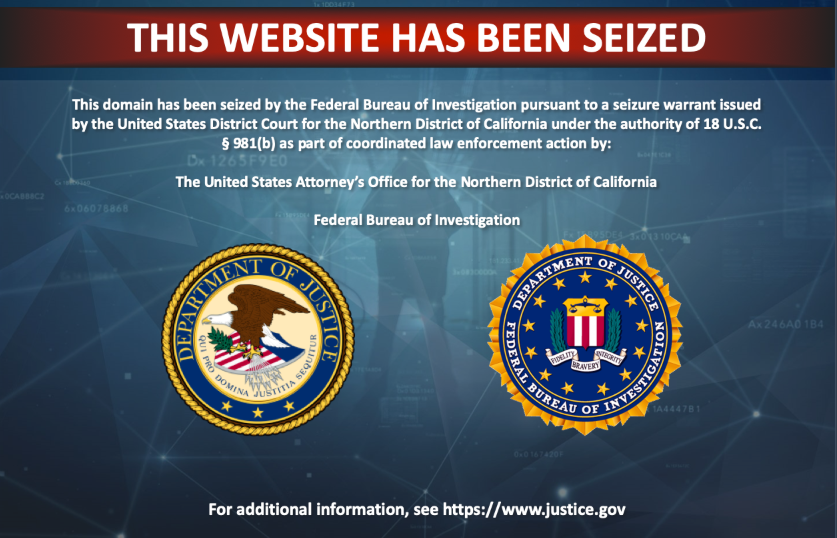
Notice placed on the website after seizure by United States Department of Justice

=== FBI investigation and domain seizure ===
In February 2020, the Federal Bureau of Investigation accused the site of being "foreign" and part of a propaganda operation. On November 4, 2020, the website of AHT was taken down by the US federal government for its alleged ties to the Iranian government and involvement in its operation to influence global opinion of the US. The takedown was part of an operation targeting 92 websites linked with Islamic Revolutionary Guard Corps (IRGC), four of which were news websites. If users visited the website, they would see a message from the FBI saying that it had been seized; it would be accompanied by official insignias of FBI and DoJ. On November 16, 2020, the site was briefly restored, operating from Canadian domain.

== Reporting ==
One of AHT's most popular news articles was published in 2016, during the 2016 US presidential election, which baselessly said Fred Trump was a member of Ku Klux Klan. The article was widely shared in Facebook by various accounts. In 2019, one of the website's articles, authored by editor Tim King from Oregon, alleged that Frederick Trump was a "pimp and tax evader". It was circulated on the internet and was fact-checked by Lead Stories as fake news. The Guardian estimated the article was shared almost 30 million times.

One of the website's articles written by its founder Anthony Hall in September 2016, titled "9/11 and the Zionist Question", claimed the 9/11 attacks were actually conducted by "Israel First neoconservatives" to "demonize Muslims". He also wrote articles about COVID-19 and justified the phrase "Death to America" in one of the site's first articles.

In November 2016, MintPress News republished one of the website's misleading stories, which falsely reported the annual Arba'in pilgrimage in Iraq as a "march against ISIS" that had caused a "media blackout".

Editor Tim King said in an interview with CNN that the website paid him "a couple of hundred dollars" per article and that Iran is "misunderstood" in the US. CNN noted that AHT sometimes republished articles from other outlets without permission and listed authors of the articles as its editors, making it look like various trusted American journalists contributed to the website. A Scoop News piece about the website, written by its former editor Eric Zuesse, said it published speculative news about "hot topics", such as the origins of COVID-19, and described the website as a "good repository of news and analysis" that had been "silenced by the US regime". He also said that before the website was shut down, it published "thousands" of articles, with 2,333 of them being archived in Wayback Machine.

Vanessa Beeley reportedly wrote for the website and authored 44 articles, some of which talked about Mossad's connections to Jeffrey Epstein and Emmanuel Macron’s "totalitarian policies". 17 of Beeley's articles were republished in other outlets, such as The Grayzone, MintPress News and Common Dreams.

In 2024, The Washington Free Beacon reported that multiple editors of the website Palestine Chronicle had contributed to the American Herald Tribune, including its founder Ramzy Baroud.

== Reception ==
Microsoft described it as a "fringe" news website linked to IRGC. Vice Magazine also described it as "fringe". The Daily Beast described AHT as a fake news website that published both far-right and left wing anti-imperialist content. It also said the website promoted itself to conservatives, publishing stories critical of LGBTQ community and Planned Parenthood. CNN concluded in 2020 that the website was an "Iranian proxy".

CAMERA described AHT in 2016 as a "fringe hate and conspiracy site" that published antisemitic and homophobic content, as well as conspiracy theories.

A 2022 book published by the Cato Institute in 2022 said the FBI's claim of AHT being linked to Iran can be disputed as majority of its editors lived in western countries.

In 2023, journalist Jake Wallis Simons described AHT as an "Iranian regime news propaganda" website. He also said British politician George Galloway was a contributor.
