= Whitney Webb =

American author and podcaster

- Citizenship: United States
- Occupations: Author, podcaster
- Employer: MintPress News
- Notable work: One Nation Under Blackmail (2022)
- Awards: Serena Shim Award (2019)

Whitney Webb is an American author and podcaster. She is based in Chile.

Webb's work focuses on Jeffrey Epstein, intelligence agencies, military organizations, surveillance, and technology. Her work has attracted criticism for promoting conspiracy theories.

Webb's work has an audience on both the right and the left of the political spectrum.

== Career and writings ==
Webb publishes through her website, Unlimited Hangout. In his collection of political essays, C. J. Hopkins has referred to Unlimited Hangout as a "malinforma-tionist" publication.

Webb is a former staff writer of MintPress News. The German publication Telepolis wrote that Webb's reporting had faced scrutiny and mentioned criticism of outlets to which she had contributed, including MintPress News and Global Research, for political bias and speculative or conspiratorial framing.

== Views and reception ==
Webb has questioned the conventional account of the September 11 attacks. The Jewish Chronicle states that before the interview with Neil Oliver, Webb had written that the "official narrative" about 9/11 is "irrational." Journalist Peter Bolton described her as one of the "9/11 Truthers" and said that left-wing 9/11 conspiracy theories, together with conspiracy theories on the political right, contributed to the political environment surrounding the rise of Donald Trump.

In 2024, Neil Oliver, a presenter on GB News and former BBC presenter, interviewed Webb. Webb stated that American organized-crime groups formed an alliance with U.S. intelligence during World War II (see: Operation Underworld) and that the CIA subsequently became part of this relationship. This alliance includes deals with organized crime to release and deport convicted felons including Lucky Luciano and Meyer Lansky on the condition they help win World War II with help from Thomas E. Dewey who previously convicted some of these felons; however they allegedly continued to partly control organized crime from abroad. She also alleges that organized crime had ties to relatives or people with close ties to numerous other politicians going back to the Second World War or more recently including Franklin D. Roosevelt and current Governor of Illinois JB Pritzker. She characterized it as "essentially a meeting of the Italian mafia and the Jewish mob".

Cultural historian Matthew Sweet said that the interview presented a claim that a global oligarchy descended from the "Jewish mob" controlled world affairs and used false accusations of antisemitism to shield itself from criticism. Webb later characterized her remarks about the crime syndicates as a rant. The New World refers to Webb as a "conspiracy theorist".

Journalist Park MacDougald wrote in 2025 that, through her books, Webb had expounded what MacDougald characterizes as "the more florid versions of the Epstein conspiracy theory", that Epstein worked for Mossad and secretly recorded prominent people in order to obtain compromising material that could be used to advance Israeli interests.

In an October 2025 article in Skeptic, Mark Hoffer discussed conspiracy theories surrounding Epstein's alleged connections to intelligence agencies. Hoffer wrote that a frequently cited claim that former U.S. Attorney Alexander Acosta had been told that Epstein "belonged to intelligence" originated with an anonymous source in a 2019 Daily Beast report and was subsequently denied under oath by Acosta. Hoffer described Webb as a "prominent conspiracist" who was "inspired to write two laboriously long volumes scrutinizing Epstein's supposed intelligence connections after coming across Acosta's purported 'belonged to intelligence' quote".

Writing for the Australian Journal of Politics and History, Timothy Lynch cites Webb's article "From 'Spook Air' to the 'Lolita Express': The Genesis and Evolution of the Jeffrey Epstein-Bill Clinton Relationship" (published by The XYZ, 2019) as an example of how contributors of the far-right news website The XYZ, who have promoted antisemitism under the form of a "literally diabolical conspiracy", made a connection between Satanism, child abuse and Jewish financial malfeasance, as well as the activities of the Israeli government.

A 2019 Black Agenda Report (BAR) article written by Webb, named "Saudi Arabia, Israel, US all Sought Bashir's Ouster: So how Real was the Sudan Revolution?", states that the Sudanese revolution was manufactured by Saudi Arabia, the US, and Israel. Writing for Africa Is a Country, anthropologist Zachary Mondesire critiques the piece, writing that the article ignores months of grassroots organizing and continuous popular protests by reducing the entire revolution to Omar Al-Bashir's ouster. According to Mondesire, Webb wrongly claims that Saudi and other Gulf nations' support for the Transitional Military Council (TMC) means outside powers created the revolution, confusing the military's leadership group with the grassroots public protest. Mondesire writes that "protests continued even after Al-Bashir had stepped down and the TMC had been established by military leadership." According to Mondesire, the U.S., Saudi Arabia and Israel support the continuance of Al-Bashir's policies. Mondesire also writes that the BAR's focus on opposing the Western empire has blinded it to real grassroots African uprisings, making the Black American Left dismiss African people as passive subjects, and that Webb's article is representative of this paradigm.

Michael Schaefer discusses Webb in the chapter "Fear of a 'scientific-technological elite': from Eisenhower's to Biden's farewell addresses – a useful category or obfuscating rhetorical device?" in the 2026 book Rise of the Digital Technocracy. Schaefer describes Webb as a "marginalized voice" who writes about technocracy. He writes that Webb "was among the first to uncover connections between DARPA-funded projects and the origin of the SARS-CoV-2 virus." Schaefer groups Webb with James Corbett, Ryan Christián and Patrick Wood as a "loose collection of independent researchers" with differing political ideologies.

Telepolis also wrote that journalist Glenn Greenwald had criticized Webb for "unreliable reporting". According to Telepolis, a central theme of Webb's work is that U.S. technology-based security policies are contributing to a surveillance state developed by individuals with connections to U.S. and Israeli intelligence services.

Musa Khan Jalalzai states that Webb has been correct about certain surveillance activities of the UK's GCHQ.

=== Criticism of Wikipedia ===
In a July 30, 2019 article published in MintPress News titled "How a Small Group of Pro-Israel Activists Blacklisted MintPress on Wikipedia," Whitney Webb asserted that allies of Israel trained partisan defenders to create coverage favorable to Israel, and, when possible, ban Israel's critics, including MintPress News, from being considered and employed as a reliable source on Wikipedia. In the article, Webb contends that a majority of the editors that voted to ban MintPress News allegedly had a demonstrable pro-Israel bias. In an effort to corroborate her claims that Israel and/or its allies have been actively training editors, Webb's article mentions information from Haaretz, The Jerusalem Post, and The Electronic Intifada.
