= Clarenceville =

Clarenceville may refer to the following places in the United States:

- Clarenceville School District, based around the former town of Clarenceville
- Clarenceville, Michigan, a former town now absorbed by Farmington Hills
- original name of Richmond Hill station (LIRR) 1869–1871

== See also ==
- Clarenceville, Quebec
