= MintPress News =

American far-left news website

- Website type: News website
- Available in: English
- Founder: Mnar Adley
- Website: mintpressnews.com
- Commercial: Yes
- Registration: Optional
- Launched: 2011

MintPress News (MPN) is an American far-left (Note: Multiple sources:) news website. It was founded and edited by Mnar Adley and was launched in January 2012, and also publishes the MintCast podcast. The site covers political, economic, foreign affairs and environmental issues.

MintPress News supported former Syrian president Bashar al-Assad, and supports the governments of Russia and Iran. It opposes the governments of Israel and Saudi Arabia, and reports geopolitical events from an anti-Western perspective. In one contentious article, MintPress News wrote that the Ghouta chemical attack in Syria was perpetrated by rebel groups rather than by the Syrian government, a claim pushed by the Russian and Syrian governments and rejected by much of the international community.

MintPress News has been accused of regularly publishing pro-Russian propaganda, and disinformation about the White Helmets, a volunteer organization that operated in Turkey and opposition-controlled parts of Syria. The site has also been described as a conspiratorial website by several media studies and disinformation scholars.

MintPress News is headquartered in Minnesota, where it operated one office location until 2014.

== History and funding ==
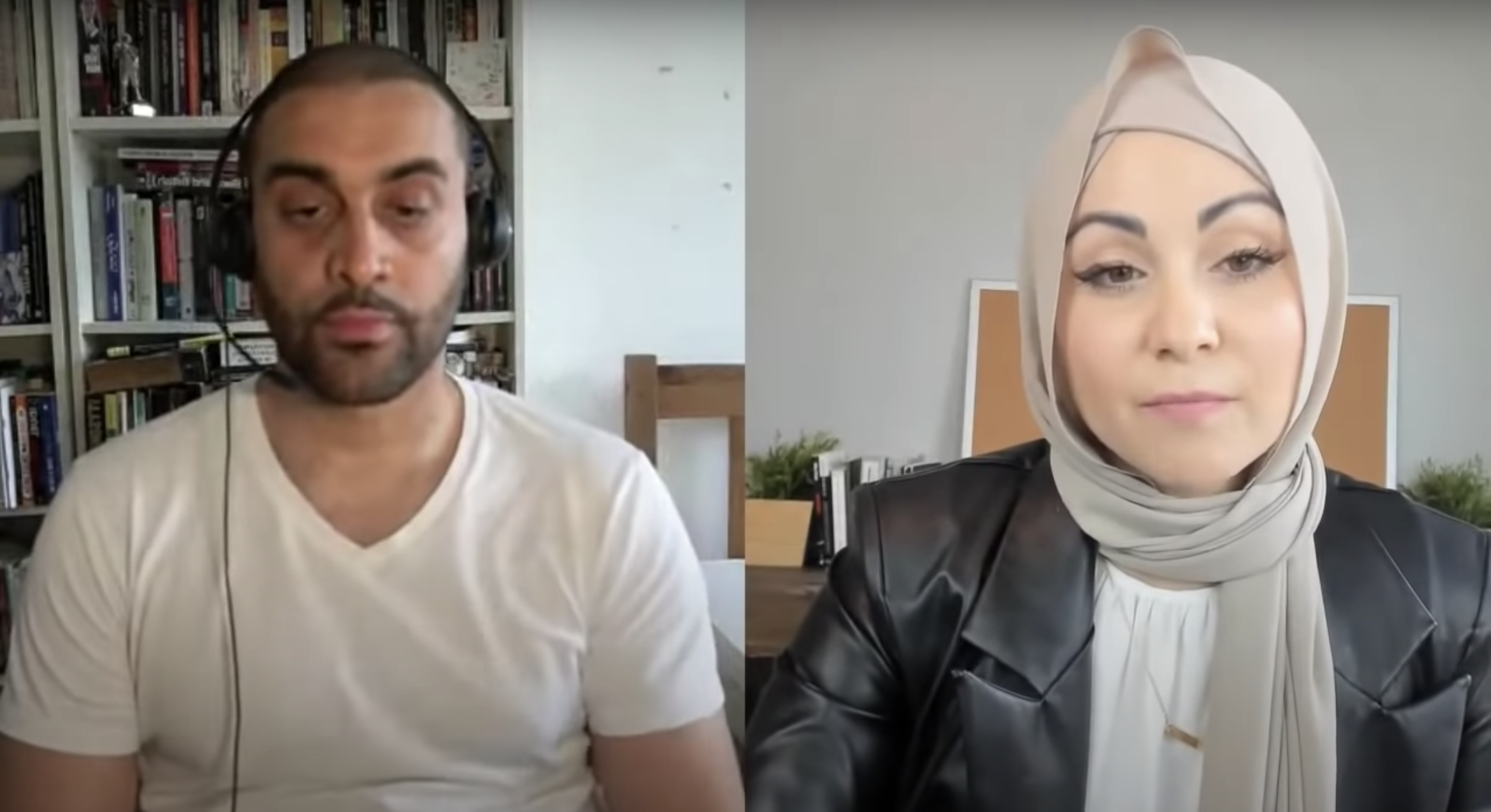
MintPress News founder Mnar Adley in an interview with British rapper and activist Lowkey in 2022

MintPress News was founded by Mnar Muhawesh (now Adley), a broadcast journalism graduate of St. Cloud State University. She began her career as an intern at Minnesota television station KARE and as a freelance journalist.

After posting her own work on a blog, in 2011 she decided to launch her own news site. Muhawesh said she believed that "our media has failed us very miserably" and that "We are in a crucial time in American history where most Americans don't know what's going on in the world around them." She spoke of her aspirations for MintPress, citing uninformed public debates around issues like Iran's nuclear capabilities, or intervention in Syria.

MintPress News said it was a for-profit "regular news organization," with an initial business plan where advertising revenues would exceed costs after three years. MintPress's anonymous investors were originally intended to fund MintPress operations until 2015. The editor had investors, who Muhawesh said were retired businesspeople. She would not name them, a situation MinnPost said was "unfortunate for a journalism operation fighting alongside people seeking transparency. The site's 'About Us' page is similarly skinny."

In a 2013 email to BuzzFeed News, Muhawesh said she restructured the business plan: "MintPress was originally funded by angel investors when I was first putting the company together over a year ago, but that route fell through last year as I restructured the business plan." She added: "I am the sole investor of MintPress." MintPress News' offices closed in 2014. Since then, the website encourages donations from the public via Patreon and through crowdfunding.

Muhawesh in 2015 said her funding comes "from donations, sponsorships, grants and ad revenue," and that MintPress was opposed to U.S. intervention in foreign wars.

That year, liberal activist Terry Burke accused MintPress of a persistent anti-Israel and pro-Assad slant to its coverage, and issued a challenge to find out its source of funding. Soon afterward, Brian Lambert of MinnPost wrote an article following up on Burke's challenge. He reported that emails to them went unanswered, their phone was disconnected, and its original office addresses in Plymouth, Minnesota "haven't been valid in well over a year". While MintPress listed 20 of its writers, Lambert wrote that it did not indicate where the money was "coming from to pay any of these people".

MintPress News received $10,000 in grants from the Association for Investment in Popular Action Committees, an organization which has been described as a pro-Assad group.

In 2022, Robert Scheer reported that Google AdSense informed publishers, including MintPress News, that, "Due to the war in Ukraine, we will pause monetization of content that exploits, dismisses, or condones the war." According to Scheer, these restrictions included "any pieces that question the NATO narrative on Ukraine". Scheer also said MintPress News had been banned from taking donations via PayPal.

== Criticism ==
The initial release of MintPress News was described by MinnPost as a "typical left-of-center" web outlet that reported on matters such as climate change and "bizarre" comments by Republican candidates. Additionally, the site's content had a clear focus on Israel and how "'American imperialism' was abetting the humiliation and slaughter of innocent Arabs". The site has published disinformation and has been accused of publishing coded antisemitic conspiracy theories, including ones about George Soros, by Spencer Sunshine and Media Matters.

MintPress News has reposted content from Russian state media outlets RT and Sputnik, and is listed as a "partner" of PeaceData, a Russian fake news site run by the Internet Research Agency. A report from New Knowledge includes MintPress News as part of the "Russian web of disinformation," and the site has published fake authors attributed to the GRU, the Russian military intelligence agency. MintPress News defended Russia's invasion of Crimea, stating that Ukraine's post-revolution government was illegitimate.

=== Syria ===
MintPress News ran numerous stories sympathetic to former Syrian president Bashar al-Assad. In 2013, BuzzFeed News described the site as having "an agenda that lines up, from its sympathy with the Syrian regime to its hostility to Sunni Saudi Arabia, with that of the Islamic Republic of Iran." The false information published by MintPress News attracts communities, including some Twitter users, that support Assad and the Russian government.

According to Bellingcat, MintPress News has received the Serena Shim Award (organized by the Association for Investment in Popular Action Committees), a financial award of an unknown amount, along with other websites which "routinely promote pro-Assad conspiracy theories".

In December 2024, The Jerusalem Post reported that MintPress News "has attempted to pivot its messaging, adopting a more critical tone" in its coverage of Assad following the fall of the Assad regime.

==== Coverage of the Ghouta chemical attacks ====
On August 29, 2013, an unverified MintPress article attributed to Dale Gavlak and Yahya Ababneh said that Syrian rebels and local residents in Ghouta, Syria alleged that rebels were responsible for the chemical weapons attack on August 21.

The story alleged that Saudi Arabia had supplied the rebels with chemical weapons, which the rebels then accidentally set off; Foreign Policy magazine described it as one of the most "crazy" conspiracy theories about chemical weapons attacks in Syria. Human Rights Watch found no evidence for the claims.

On September 20, the Brown Moses Blog published a statement from Gavlak saying that "despite my repeated requests, made directly and through legal counsel, they have not been willing to issue a retraction stating that I was not the author. Yahya Ababneh is the sole reporter and author of the Mint Press News piece." Gavlak also said the report had not been verified.

Gavlak also told the New York Times that "There was no fact finding or reporting by me for the piece. I did not travel to Syria, so I cannot corroborate [Ababneh's] account" and that Muhawesh refused to remove her name from the byline because "this is an existential issue for MintPress and an issue of credibility as this will appear as though we are lying."

MintPress added an editor's note at the top of the article stating Ababneh was the sole reporter on the ground in Syria, while Gavlak assisted in researching and writing the article. It said that Gavlak was a MintPress News correspondent who had freelanced for the Associated Press (AP) in Jordan for a decade. A note at the bottom of the story says: "Some information in this article could not be independently verified. Mint Press News will continue to provide further information and updates." The Russian Foreign Ministry cited the article in future statements. On September 21, 2013, MintPress published a statement by Muhawesh saying soon after the article was published, Gavlak retracted her involvement due to pressure from third parties, which Gavlak believed was prompted by Prince Bandar. The statement also said that Abadneh was being threatened by Saudi officials.

Following the publication of the article, Gavlak stated she has been suspended from the AP. On 22 September 2013, the Star Tribune wrote that "The story continues to be cited by conspiracy-minded websites and supporters of the embattled Assad government".

When asked about the MintPress News story, Åke Sellström, the chief U.N. weapons inspector in Syria remarked, "They are famous for 1001 Arabian Nights stories!"

==== White Helmets ====
A study led by Kate Starbird at the University of Washington found that MintPress News was part of a core cluster of websites amplifying disinformation about the White Helmets, a volunteer organization formed during the Syrian Civil War. The White Helmets has been the target of disinformation campaigns perpetrated by pro-Assad and pro-Russian groups. Such disinformation increased dramatically following the Douma chemical attack. Many of Vanessa Beeley's conspiracy theories about the White Helmets appeared on MintPress News.

=== Arbaeen pilgrimage claim ===
In November 2016, a MintPress News article entitled "Media Blackout As Millions Of Muslims March Against ISIS In Iraq" became a top trending story on Facebook, which prompted criticism that the article was misleading. BuzzFeed News wrote, "This week has seen millions of Shiite Muslims participate in Arbaeen, one of the world's largest pilgrimages, in Iraq. But they are not specifically marching against ISIL, nor has there been a 'media blackout.'"

BuzzFeed News said the article had been sourced from American Herald Tribune, a website edited by Anthony Hall, a 9/11 and Sandy Hook shooting conspiracy theorist suspended from his job as a professor at the University of Lethbridge on charges of antisemitism.

Snopes described the claims in the MintPress article as inaccurate: "The pilgrimage was not a massive protest against ISIS, nor did a "media blackout" prevent news agencies from covering the event." MintPress stood by its story.

=== Guarani Aquifer ===
In 2018, MintPress News falsely claimed that Coca-Cola and Nestlé were privatising the Guarani Aquifer, a major South American water reserve. The site additionally made the false claim that the alleged deal was being negotiated by Brazilian president Michel Temer and has reached an "advanced" stage.

The site offered no evidence to support their claims and only provided vague statements. Experts, like law professor Gabriel Eckstein, said that it would be physically impossible for a private company to control the aquifer due to its large size. Coca-Cola and Nestlé also refuted the allegations.

=== Nicaragua ===
In 2018, during the 2018–2022 Nicaraguan protests, MintPress News published a "lengthy, insinuation-infused attack" on the photojournalist Carl David Goette-Luciak, a freelance reporter for NPR and The Guardian, implying he was anti-regime.

According to journalist Joshua Collins, MintPress accompanied the story, entitled "How an American Anthropologist Tied to US Regime-Change Proxies Became the MSM's Man in Nicaragua", with a photo of Luciak beside an armed soldier labelled as an opposition figure, when it was in fact a government-supporting Sandinista.

The false story nevertheless went viral, Luciak went into hiding, was eventually captured by state forces, threatened with torture and deported from the country.

=== Israel–Palestine ===
In 2024, MintPress News published articles claiming that Israeli spies and lobbyists are writing America's news. According to The Jerusalem Post, "In both cases, the evidence was flimsy at best. In the former, a brief internship at AIPAC during college was all it took to be a part of an ominous conspiracy to control the media. In the latter, a previous stint as a reservist in Unit 8200 of the IDF's Intelligence Corps was more than sufficient to brand a journalistic security analysis as a clandestine psychological operation."

In January 2025, after Drop Site News published a report by Owen Jones alleging that the BBC's Middle East editor Raffi Berg was acting to skew the BBC's coverage of the Gaza war in favor of Israel, MintPress News followed up by claiming that Berg was collaborating with the CIA and Mossad after he wrote a book about Mossad.

In May 2025, Ahmed Fouad Alkhatib called MintPress News "an Iranian-backed rag, try[ing] to claim that the Israeli government is paying me $30 million to promote genocide."

=== Other ===
In his 2018 book Escaping the Rabbit Hole, science writer Mick West commented on a MintPress News article titled "No Longer Conspiracy: CIA Admits Plans Of Aerosol Spraying For Geoengineering", writing that one way people claim that the government has "admitted" to using chemtrails is "to point to people in government or academia discussing possible future geoengineering, and then claiming that's an 'admission' of current geoengineering".

In February 2023, The Daily Dot reported that a conspiracy theory published by MintPress News claiming that FBI agents were infiltrating Big Tech companies had been adopted by Donald Trump's 2024 presidential campaign and the American far-right, which claimed that Twitter and other social media companies are being controlled by the Democratic Party and the deep state. Kate Starbird of the University of Washington identified MintPress News as part of a content-sharing cluster in the conspiratorial Internet, in which "the same article might appear on several and sometimes dozens of different websites".

== Frequent contributors and partners ==
Eva Bartlett, Vanessa Beeley, Max Blumenthal, Miko Peled, Kevin Zeese, and the cartoonist Carlos Latuff are listed as regular contributors to the website. The author Whitney Webb is also associated with MintPress News. Rapper Lowkey hosts a podcast on MintPress News.

In 2023, Randi Lucile Nord, a MintPress News staff writer, admitted to spray-painting a swastika and the word "Azov" (in reference to the Azov Brigade) on a synagogue in Royal Oak, Michigan, in order to undermine United States support to Ukraine during the Russian invasion of Ukraine.

MintPress News frequently partners with the outlets Project Censored, Free Speech TV, Media Roots Radio, ShadowProof, The Grayzone, Truthout, CommonDreams, and Antiwar.com.

In September 2013, Antiwar.com apologized for linking to and reprinting a MintPress News story that Syrian rebels were responsible for the Ghouta sarin attacks of 2013.

== See also ==
- The Grayzone
