= Tareck Raffoul =

Lebanese filmmaker and photographer

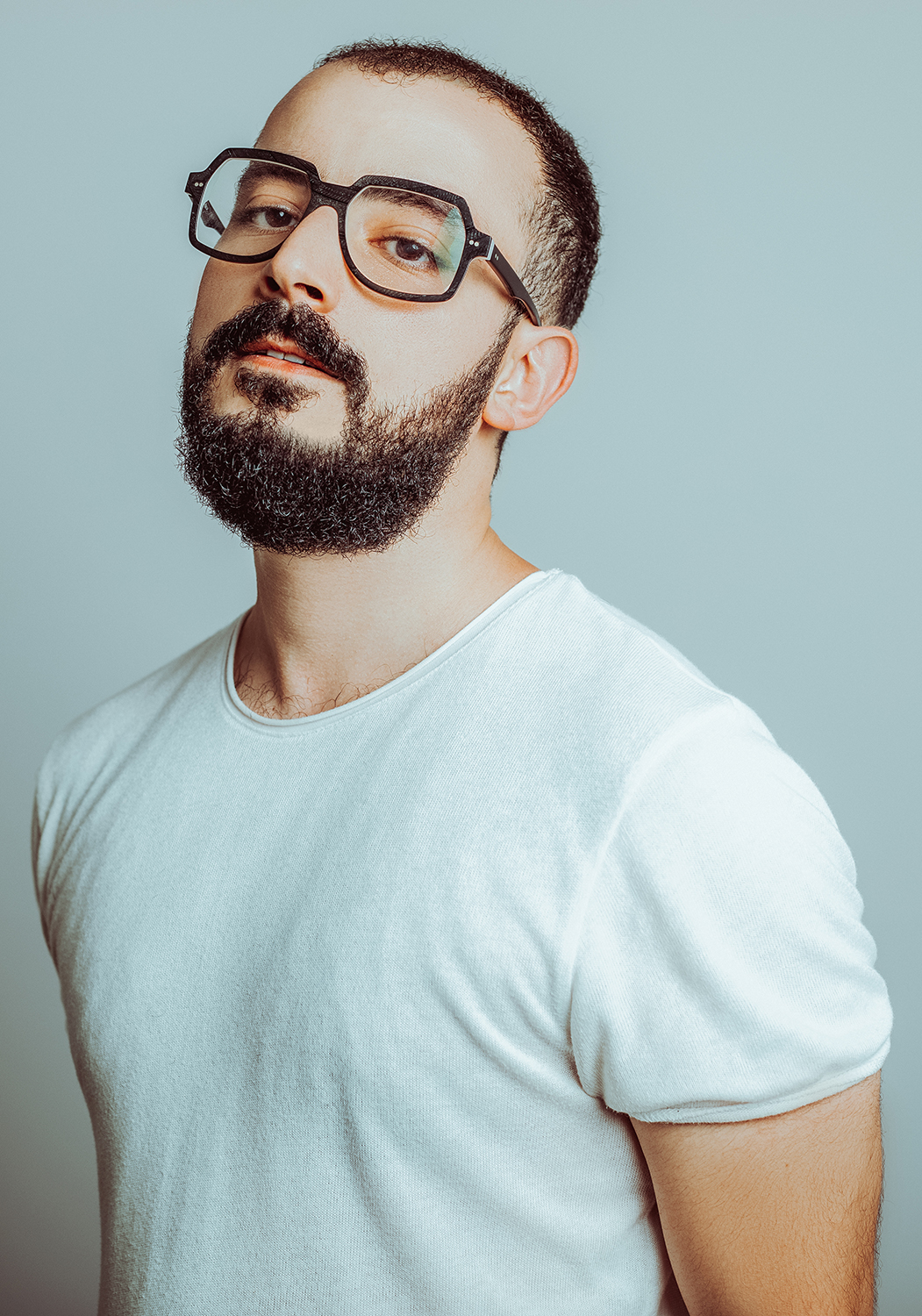
- Born: June 20, 1989; Miziara, Lebanon
- Education: Erasmus Mundus
- Known for: Film and Photography

Tareck Raffoul (Arabic: طارق رفول; born June 20, 1989) is a Lebanese filmmaker, photographer, creative director, and content creator; he is based in Paris.

== Biography ==
Raffoul received his bachelor's degree in audio-visual arts from the American University of Technology in Lebanon; he then obtained a scholarship for a master's degree in Filmmaking with a focus on Documentaries from Erasmus Mundus Docnomads program. and studied in Portugal's Universidade Lusófona de Lisboa, Színház- és Filmművészeti Egyetem in Hungary and in Belgium at the LUCA School of Arts.

Raffoul directed short films one of which is the decorated "Piros Fehér Zöld" (Red white green in English). The movie recounts the story of Anna, a mother who struggles to care for Laczi, her 37-year-old down syndrome child. "Piros Feher Zold" was selected in different film festivals between 2014 and 2015 such as Belgrade Documentary and Short Film Festival, Mediawave International Film Festival, International Student Film Festival (Winner best short documentary), Scottish Mental Health Arts and Film Festival (Winner best short documentary), NDU International Film Festival (Special jury mention award), Original Narrative: Student Short Film Festival Dubai (People choice award and the Best documentary award), Festival Nacional de Cine Estudiantil Fenacies Uruguay (Winner best international short documentary).

In 2015, Raffoul was selected as one of the rising talents in cinematography in Talents Beirut under Berlinale talents campus (Berlin International Film Festival). In 2016, he moved to Dubai where he worked as a content creator and head of content for agencies and production houses until he started freelancing as a photographer and filmmaking in 2018. In 2018 Tareck got selected by Starch Foundation where he exhibited two photography series "Ashes to Nature" April 2018 and "Leaving Home" November 2018. In April 2019 he did his 1st solo exhibition in Belgrade, Serbia under Belgrade photo month.

== Filmography ==
Year	Title	Film festivals / Awards / Notes
2013	Monsantempo (Monsantime)	Panorama Film Festival (Portugal – May 2013); NOFI Film Festival (Los Angeles – December 2013)
2013	Átmeneti (Temporary)	Romani Film Festival (Budapest – May 2013)
2013	Érintés (Touch)	Queer Lisboa Film Festival (Lisbon – September 2013); Side by Side Film Festival (St. Petersburg – October 2013); Budapest Pride LGBT Film Festival (Budapest – November 2013); Mix Brasil Festival Culture of Diversity (Rio de Janeiro – November 2013); Mix Brasil Festival Culture of Diversity (São Paulo – November 2013); Gay&Lesbian Film Festival, Ljubljana (Ljubljana – November 2013); Outview Film Festival (Athens – May 2014); Sinehan sa Summer (New York – July 2014); Fidé (Paris – April 2015)
2013	Piros Fehér Zöld (Red White Green)	Special screening under IDFA film student route in cooperation with the Netherlands Film Academy (Amsterdam – November 2013); Navi Mumbai International Film Festival (India – February 2014): Winner best short documentary; Festival Internacional de cine de Iquique (Chile – February 2014); One World International Human Rights Documentary Film Festival (Prague – Czech Republic – March 2014); Belgrade Documentary and Short Film Festival (Belgrade – Serbia – April 2014); Festival Internacional Colchagua Cine (Chile – April 2014); Festival Internacional De Cortometrajes Cine A La Calle (Colombia – May 2014); Monaco Charity Film Festival (Monaco – May 2014); Mediawave International Film Festival (Hungary – April 2014); International Student Film Festival (Písek – Czech Republic – October 2014): Winner best short documentary; Scottish Mental Health Arts and Film Festival (Scotland – October 2014): Winner best short documentary; Filmski Front Festival (Serbia – October 2014); NDU International Film Festival (Lebanon – November 2014): Special jury mention award; Manya Human Rights Travel Film Festival (Uganda – December 2014); Original Narrative: Student Short Film Festival (Dubai – February 2015): People choice award and the Best documentary award; Arab Short Film Festival (Lebanon – June 2015): Winner 2nd prize; Montenegro Film Festival (Montenegro – August 2015); Festival Nacional de Cine Estudiantil Fenacies (Uruguay – September 2015): Winner best international short documentary; Rolling Frames Film Festival (India – October 2015)
2015	Salam	DocLisboa Film Festival (Lisbon – October 2015); Tehran International Short Film Festival (Tehran, Iran – October 2016)
