= The Grayzone =

US-based news website and blog

- The homepage of The Grayzone on September 11, 2021
- Website type: News website, blog
- Founder: Max Blumenthal
- Editor: Wyatt Reed (managing)
- Key people: Ben Norton (until January 2022); Aaron Maté; Anya Parampil; Alex Rubenstein; Kit Klarenberg
- Website: thegrayzone.com
- Launched: December 2015

The Grayzone is an American far-left (Note: Sources characterizing The Grayzone as far-left:) news website and blog. (Note: Sources describing The Grayzone as a blog:) It has been described as fringe by numerous sources. (Note: Sources characterizing The Grayzone as fringe:) The site was founded and is edited by American journalist Max Blumenthal. It was initially founded as The Grayzone Project and was affiliated with AlterNet until early 2018.

Coverage of The Grayzone has focused on its misleading reporting, its criticism of American foreign policy, and its sympathetic coverage of the Russian, Chinese and former Syrian governments. The Grayzone has been accused of downplaying and defending the persecution of Uyghurs in China, (Note: "Denied human rights abuses against Uyghurs":) of publishing conspiracy theories about Xinjiang, Syria and other regions, and of publishing pro-Russian propaganda and disinformation, especially during the Russian invasion of Ukraine.

== History ==
The Grayzone was founded as a blog called The Grayzone Project in December 2015 by Max Blumenthal. The blog was hosted on AlterNet until early 2018, when The Grayzone became independent of the website. Managing editor Wyatt Reed, contributor Mohamed Elmaazi and regular freelancer Jeremy Loffredo worked for Russian state media before contributing to the website.

The English Wikipedia formally deprecated the use of The Grayzone as a source for facts in its articles in March 2020, citing issues with the website's factual reliability.

Grayzone staff Blumenthal and Aaron Maté acted as briefers on behalf of the Permanent Mission of the Russian Federation to the United Nations at UN meetings organized by Russia.

== Reporting and reception ==
The Grayzone's news content is generally considered to be fringe, and the website maintains a pro-Kremlin editorial line, centered around an opposition to the foreign policy of the United States and support for the creation of a multipolar world. The site has been criticized for defending Russia and other authoritarian regimes. In Reorienting Hong Kong's Resistance: Leftism, Decoloniality, and Internationalism (2022), The Grayzone was described as being "known for misleading reporting in the service of authoritarian states". Nerma Jelacic, writing in the Index on Censorship, described The Grayzone as "a Kremlin-connected online outlet that pushes pro-Russian conspiracy theories and genocide denial." In 2019, The Grayzone had claimed the Commission for International Justice and Accountability, of which Jelacic is a director, collaborated with ISIS and Jabhat al-Nusra affiliates.

In February 2021, tweets concerning a Grayzone article by Blumenthal were the first to receive a Twitter warning label stating "These materials may have been obtained through hacking". The story was titled "Reuters, BBC, and Bellingcat participated in covert UK Foreign Office–funded programs to 'weaken Russia', leaked docs reveal". The story referred to hacked and leaked documents and alleged that a British Army unit has used "social media to help fight wars".

In early October 2023, former Grayzone contributor Ben Norton feuded with Blumenthal on Twitter over Norton's accusation that The Grayzone had taken a right-wing turn to appeal to supporters of Donald Trump. During the dispute, Blumenthal revealed that Norton had been fired for criticizing other contributors' anti-lockdown and anti-vaccine stances with respect to the COVID-19 pandemic. Norton said that Blumenthal had wrested control of Norton's Grayzone-affiliated but independently produced podcast from him through legal maneuvering.

=== China ===
The government of China, officials within the Chinese Communist Party (CCP) and Chinese state media have viewed The Grayzone's coverage of China positively. In order to dispute accusations of ongoing atrocities in Xinjiang, Chinese media and officials have increasingly cited posts from The Grayzone in their public communications. (Note: "China cites:") According to a report from the Australian Strategic Policy Institute, Chinese media and affiliated entities began to amplify articles from The Grayzone in December 2019 after the site posted an article critical of Xinjiang researcher Adrian Zenz. Chinese media cited The Grayzone at least 313 times between December 2019 and February 2021, 252 of which were in English-language publications, the report said.

The site has promoted pro-Beijing narratives on Xinjiang, Hong Kong and Taiwan. In particular, it downplayed the widely reported scope of China's Xinjiang re-education camps and other abuses by the Chinese government against Uyghurs and other Turkic Muslim minorities. Blumenthal has said that reports of the persecution of Uyghurs in China use "the hostile language of a Cold War, weaponizing a minority group". He stated in July 2020 that, "I don't have reason to doubt that there's something going in Xinjiang, that there could even be repression. But we haven't seen the evidence for these massive claims." The Grayzone has published articles intended to discredit researchers and organizations investigating the persecution of Uyghurs, saying that the figure of 1 million Uyghurs in re-education camps is based on "highly dubious" studies published by Chinese Human Rights Defenders and Adrian Zenz, and that those studies cannot be trusted because CHRD receives funding from the US government and Zenz is employed by the Victims of Communism Memorial Foundation. Contributor Ajit Singh and Blumenthal called Zenz an "evangelical religious fanatic" who "believes he is 'led by God' on a 'mission' against China."

In an article for Christian news magazine World, June Cheng has defended CHRD and Zenz's research, saying that they used publicly available data released by the Chinese government to estimate the number of Uyghurs in detention, and that The Grayzone exaggerated the extent to which their research was based on a small number of interviews. Cheng has also criticized Singh and Blumenthal's attempts to discredit reports by Radio Free Asia, saying that despite it being funded and supervised by the US government, it is "the only Uighur-language news outlet in the world independent of the Chinese government." Azeezah Kanji and David Palumbo-Liu wrote that The Grayzone focuses on "discrediting some prominent messengers calling attention to the Uighur's persecution while leaving the vast body of evidence behind the message largely untouched"; they argue that much of the evidence for persecution comes directly from Chinese state sources and that The Grayzone systematically ignore this evidence even in sources it cites.

=== Israel–Palestine ===
An August 2018 Grayzone report revealed that Howard Sterling, an American lawyer that advises Israeli healthcare companies, was the owner of Canary Mission, a website reportedly dedicated to demonising pro-Palestinian students. Hamzah Raza, co-author of the report and allegedly a victim of Canary Mission himself, told Middle East Eye he hoped his research can stop the "defamation and harassment" of students "by taking away the anonymity that Canary Mission hides behind".

According to a November 2023 opinion article by biology researcher Michal Perach in Haaretz, Max Blumenthal wrote a Grayzone article that denied evidence of Hamas' war crimes in its October 7 attacks and manipulated quotes from Israeli sources to paint Israel (instead of Hamas) as being responsible for most of the victims. Asa Winstanley, writing in The Electronic Intifada, said that The Electronic Intifada, The Grayzone, Mondoweiss and The Cradle have "all found that many – if not most – of the 1,154 Israelis the government claims were killed by Palestinians were actually killed by Israel itself." The Intercept said Blumenthal in The Grayzone and The Electronic Intifada were among the first outlets to flag inconsistencies in a New York Times report about sexual abuse during the October 7 attacks. An analysis in The Grayzone of a UN report corroborating Hamas rape allegations during the Gaza war, claimed the report had put forward "no evidence of systematic rape". The Grayzone also published a transcribed discussion between Max Blumenthal and Chris Hedges in which they agreed that Israel launched a "shock-and-awe campaign of misinformation" to create "political space for its brutal assault on Gaza".

The Al Jazeera Journalism Review wrote a review of Blumenthal's 2024 documentary, Atrocity, Inc. They said that the film both questions the mainstream narratives advanced in the wake of the 7 October attacks, and criticizes the "failure of mainstream Western media to report on Israeli intentions to carry out genocidal massacres in Gaza." AJJR concludes that the film "is a call for media professionals to uphold their duty to the public and humanity by rigorously fact-checking official statements and resisting the seductive ease of propagandistic official narratives."

On October 7, 2024, Grayzone journalist Jeremy Loffredo and three other international and Israeli journalists were detained at a checkpoint in the West Bank on suspicion of "assisting an enemy in war" for their reporting on the October 2024 Iranian strikes against Israel. Loffredo's article showed the locations where Iranian missiles struck an Israeli air base near Nevatim and the Mossad headquarters in Tel Aviv. The same information was also revealed by other media outlets. The journalists' cameras and phones were confiscated. The other journalists were released after six hours with Loffredo but the Jerusalem Magistrate's Court extended Loffredo's remand. His release was ordered by a judge after a Ynet reporter said the military censor had approved publishing Loffredo's video. The Police appealed this order because Loffredo refused to give investigators access to his phone but the Jerusalem District Court denied the appeal. Jonah Valdez in The Intercept and Rivkah Brown in Novara Media said Loffredo's arrest drew little interest from Western media outlets.KCRW podcast Question Everything delved into the context of Loffredo's arrest and Israeli court proceedings.

=== Latin America ===
When a humanitarian aid convoy on the border of Venezuela caught fire in February 2019, The Grayzone published an article by Blumenthal in which he stated that the U.S. government and mainstream media had falsely reported forces supporting President Nicolás Maduro were responsible for sparking the flames, writing that "the claim was absurd on its face." Glenn Greenwald, writing in The Intercept, commented that Blumenthal "compiled substantial evidence strongly suggesting that the trucks were set ablaze by anti-Maduro protesters" and that The New York Times took credit for reporting evidence compiled by The Grayzone weeks earlier when the Times later reversed its position.

The Grayzone promoted the Nicaraguan government's narrative on the 2018–2022 Nicaraguan protests and the November 2021 Nicaraguan general election. The platform also conducted an "unquestioning interview", according to The Guardian, with Nicaraguan President Daniel Ortega. Blumenthal and Norton expressed their support for the government by dancing to "El Comandante se queda" (English: The Comandante Stays) a cumbia song composed in support of Ortega during the 2018 protests. The Grayzone published an open letter, promoted by RT, criticizing The Guardian's coverage of Nicaragua and one of its contributors, Carl David Goette-Luciak. Goette-Luciak was later arrested and deported by the Nicaraguan government. John Perry, writing under the pseudonym Charles Redvers, published a "confession" on The Grayzone of student protester Valeska Sandoval. The confession was false and Sandoval made it under duress while in prison.

=== Russia–Ukraine ===
Amid the Russian invasion of Ukraine, the website has published disinformation, including the debunked claim that Ukrainian fighters were using civilians as human shields, and that the 2022 Mariupol theatre bombing was staged by the Azov Regiment to warrant NATO intervention. The Grayzone's invitation to the 2022 Web Summit, the largest technology conference in Europe, was withdrawn over backlash against the website's anti-Ukrainian narratives amid the Russian invasion of Ukraine.

According to the Brookings Institution in 2023, Grayzone contributors such as Aaron Maté are among the most-promoted social media accounts boosted by Russian information networks in Latin America to promote Russia's narrative on its war with Ukraine.

After the documentary Navalny won an Academy Award in February 2023, The Grayzone published an article nominally authored by Lucy Komisar attacking the film; the article was actually written at least in part by the neural network Writesonic, and it referenced sources that did not exist as the basis for its criticism. The Grayzone amended the article following a controversy about the use of AI in the writing of the article, and then removed it at the request of Komisar.

The Russian fake news website Peace Data has republished articles by The Grayzone in order to build a reputation as a progressive and anti-Western media source and to attract contributors. False claims published by The Grayzone are referenced by many Twitter users who backed the Russian government.

=== Syria ===
Amid the Syrian civil war, the website supported the government of Bashar al-Assad. Articles by Grayzone reporter Aaron Maté echoed claims by the Russian and Syrian governments that documents leaked to Wikileaks showed that the Organisation for the Prohibition of Chemical Weapons (OPCW) had "doctored" its report on the Douma chemical attack "to frame the Syrian government and justify the missile strikes launched by the US, UK and France against forces loyal to the government," denying that the Syrian government had used chemical weapons against civilians, and accusing the OPCW of a "cover-up".

Research from the Institute for Strategic Dialogue (ISD), which studied 28 social media accounts, individuals, outlets and organisations, stated that Maté was the "most prolific spreader of disinformation" on matters concerning Syria amongst its study group, having surpassed Vanessa Beeley in 2020. Research published in 2020 in the Harvard Kennedy School's Misinformation Review found that Blumenthal was among the top 20 amplified accounts and Grayzone among the top 20 linked domains in a Twitter information ecosystem promoting pro-government, critical narratives about Syria's White Helmets organization.

== Funding ==
In 2022, Blumenthal stated that The Grayzone receives funding through Patreon and from "private friends of mine who are basically progressive Americans who support progressive media." He said The Grayzone receives no state funding from Russia or China.

In August 2023, GoFundMe froze more than $90,000 from 1,100 contributors to The Grayzone, citing unspecified "external concerns". Blumenthal said he believed the concerns were political and related to the platform's coverage of the war in Ukraine. The Grayzone's managing editor Wyatt Reed had also had issues with PayPal and Venmo since reporting on Ukraine.

In June 2024, The Washington Post reported that hacked documents revealed that Reed received payments of around $5,500 from Iranian state-controlled broadcaster Press TV for "occasional contributions to its programming in 2020 and 2021".

== Staff ==
Several staff, former staff, and freelance writers have previously been employed by Russian state media outlets RT and Sputnik, among them Anya Parampil, Alex Rubinstein, Kit Klarenberg, Wyatt Reed, Mohamed Elmaazi, Dan Cohen, Rania Khalek and Jeremy Loffredo. Parampil had previously worked as an anchor and correspondent for RT America. Reed, who was credited as a managing editor as of 2023, made occasional contributions to Iranian state-run Press TV in 2020 and 2021.

== See also ==
- Double Down News
- MintPress News – American far-left news website
