= Carl David Goette-Luciak =

Austrian-American journalist

Carl David Goette-Luciak is an Austrian-American journalist. Carl contributed to media outlets such as British daily The Guardian and The Washington Post and was based in Nicaragua for three years.

Goette-Luciak was the victim of a targeted online harassment campaign and threats from Ortega supporters (particularly on websites such as MintPress News and The Grayzone), and his address was published online; the campaign was denounced by the Committee to Protect Journalists. Like Tim Rodgers, an American reporter forced to leave Nicaragua in April 2018, Goette-Luciak was accused by law enforcement officers of working for the Central Intelligence Agency (CIA) and was deported afterwards. One police officer alleged he was being removed from the country for attending illegal protests and distributing false information.
