= Serena Shim =

Lebanese-American journalist (1985–2014)

- Born: October 10, 1985; Michigan, U.S.
- Died: October 19, 2014 (aged 29); Suruç, Şanlıurfa Province, Turkey
- Resting place: Bourj el-Barajneh, Lebanon
- Other name: Serena Ali Suhaim
- Education: American University of Technology
- Alma mater: Clarenceville High School
- Occupation: Television journalist
- Years active: 2007–2014
- Employer: Press TV
- Children: 2

Serena Shim (Arabic: سيرينا علي سحيم, Serena Ali Suhaim; October 10, 1985 – October 19, 2014) was a Lebanese-American journalist for Press TV. While covering the Siege of Kobanê as a war correspondent, she died in a car crash in Suruç, Turkey.

== Early life ==
Shim was born on October 10, 1985, in Michigan and was raised in Dearborn and Livonia. Shim's parents were Lebanese immigrants. She graduated from Clarenceville High School in Livonia. Shim moved to Lebanon after her parents divorced and lived in her father's hometown of Bourj el-Barajneh. She attended the American University of Technology (AUT) in Lebanon.

== Career ==
Shim started working for Press TV in 2007, while still an undergraduate at AUT. During her career, she reported from several countries including Syria, Iraq, Lebanon, Ukraine and Turkey. In 2013, she covered Turkey's Gezi Park protests.

On October 17, 2014, in an on-camera segment for Press TV, Shim said she was accused of being a spy by Turkish intelligence. Shim reported she had been threatened by Turkish authorities, saying:

I am very surprised at this accusation. I've even thought of actually approaching Turkish intelligence and, because I have nothing to hide, I've never done anything aside from my job and I'd like to make that apparent to them. However, I am a bit worried because as you know, and as the viewers know, that Turkey has been labeled by Reporters Without Borders as the largest prison for journalists. So I am a bit frightened about what they might use against me. [...] We were some of the first people on the ground – if not the first people – to get that story of [...] militants going in through the Turkish border [...] I’ve got images of them in World Food Organization [sic] trucks. It was very apparent that they were militants by their beards, by the clothes they wore, and they were going in there with NGO trucks.

In November 2014, journalist Alex Thomson questioned the evidence for her story, saying she "simply saw some dodgy-looking blokes with beards in an aid truck".

At the time of Shim's death, she was covering the Siege of Kobanî.

== Personal life ==
Shim was married to Ibrihim Shim and had two children. At the time of Shim's death, her son was four years old and her daughter was two years old. Shim was the breadwinner in her family, with her husband staying home to raise their children. She was of Shia background.

== Death ==
Shim died on October 19, 2014 in Suruç, Turkey at the age of 29. Hürriyet Daily News, Today's Zaman and Anadolu Agency reported that Shim was 30 years old. Turkish media outlets reported that Shim died after a head-on collision with a large cement truck, providing photographs to support their report. Shim was in a rental car, sitting in the passenger seat, driven by her 16-year-old cousin Judy Irish. Shim was returning to her hotel after an assignment in Suruç. Irish blacked out after the car's airbags deployed but she did not sustain life-threatening injuries, suffering only a broken nose. Irish was taken to Suruç State Hospital. In 2016, Irish said she did not collide with a truck head-on. Irish told Fox News:

I was driving in a three-lane, one-way highway in the fast lane. I could see the semi-truck that was behind me in the middle lane. And he was going very quickly and he sped up in front of me and cut me off, making me crash into him.

According to the truck driver, Irish's car was "traveling at a very high speed, went out of control, entered my lane and came under my truck."

One day after Shim's death, Press TV reported that "the identity and whereabouts of the truck driver remain unknown." On October 20, Hürriyet Daily News reported that the truck driver was arrested and his identity was not released, according to Doğan News Agency. On October 24, Hürriyet Daily News obtained an official report which said the truck driver, identified as Şükrü Salan, was not responsible for the crash. According to the report, Irish was the "sole culprit". The report said Irish "entered the junction too fast, violating a lane as well as traffic rules by turning right." After he was initially detained following the accident, Salan was released. In December 2014, Hürriyet Daily News and Today's Zaman reported that although two reports found that Salan was not at fault, the Suruç Public Prosecutor Office was seeking a jail term for Salan of two to six years on manslaughter charges, and the first hearing of the trial was scheduled for March 2015.

Anadolu Agency reported that after an autopsy at Şanlıurfa Forensic Medicine Institution, Shim's body was sent to Beirut on October 22, 2014. Hundreds of people attended her funeral and Shim was buried on October 22 in Bourj el-Barajneh.

=== Reactions ===
Campaigns calling for justice circulated on social media. On October 20, 2014, Reporters Without Borders and the Committee to Protect Journalists told BuzzFeed News they were investigating the case. The International Federation of Journalists listed Shim as one of 17 accidental deaths in their list of journalists and media staff killed in 2014. Alex Thomson of Channel 4 News said a proper investigation into her death was urgent and necessary, but said the idea she was deliberately killed in a traffic collision was a "bizarre method" and "far-fetched".

==== Shim's family ====
Shim's mother, Judy Poe, said she was not contacted by the US State Department or the Turkish government following her daughter's death. Poe viewed her daughter's body inside a Beirut morgue before her burial and said "there was not a single mark on [her]". Poe told Fox News that "I absolutely suspect foul play" and said Shim's death was "no accident". Poe said that Shim feared for her life. Poe suggested the scene was staged to look like an accident but did not elaborate on who could have been involved in her daughter's death. Poe, citing media reports in Turkey, said Irish and Shim were transported to different hospitals. Poe claimed Shim was taken to a hospital which was more than two hours further away than the hospital where Irish was taken. Shim's sister, Fatmeh Shim, said there were no pictures of Shim in the car. She said, "I think my sister was assassinated". Shim's family has also said that the car seen in the crash scene photos was not the one rented by Shim and Irish. In November 2016, Shim's family renewed their call for an investigation by the United States government.

==== Press TV ====
Hamid Reza Emadi, the news director for Press TV, said Shim's death was a tragedy for "anyone who wants to get the truth." According to Emadi, "her death is very suspect and it is likely an outcome of her critical expository reports of the adverse impact of Turkish and Saudi policies on Syrian refugees." One political analyst on Press TV said Shim had been "assassinated by the government of Turkish president Recep Tayyip Erdoğan." Press TV provided no evidence to support their suspicions.

==== Turkey ====
On October 20, 2014, İzzettin Küçük, the Governor of Şanlıurfa, dismissed Press TV's claims about Shim's death as "completely baseless". Küçük said a detailed explanation of the circumstances surrounding Shim's death would be released following an investigation. A spokesman for Turkey's embassy in the US expressed condolences for Shim's death.

==== United States ====
US representative John Conyers sent Shim's family a condolence letter. In November 2014, the US State Department told Fox News it "does not conduct investigations into deaths overseas" but they "closely monitor" all investigations into overseas deaths of US citizens. In November 2016, a State Department official said "we extend our deepest condolences to her family and friends".

== Recognition ==
Shim has been memorialised at the Arab American National Museum in Dearborn, Michigan.

The Association for Investment in Popular Action Committees named an award after Shim. According to a website set up by the group, "the Serena Shim Award for Uncompromised Integrity in Journalism honors non-mainstream journalists who continue to tell challenging truths in difficult times." According to Bellingcat, the group supports Syria's Bashar al-Assad. Recipients of the award have included Jimmy Dore, Caitlin Johnstone, Eva Bartlett, Ajamu Baraka, Max Blumenthal, Ben Norton, Aaron Maté, Kim Iversen, Rania Khalek, Vanessa Beeley, MintPress News, Jackson Hinkle, and Venezuelanalysis.

== See also ==
- Maya Nasser
- Marie Colvin
- List of journalists killed in Turkey
