= Arjan El Fassed =

Dutch politician (born 1973)

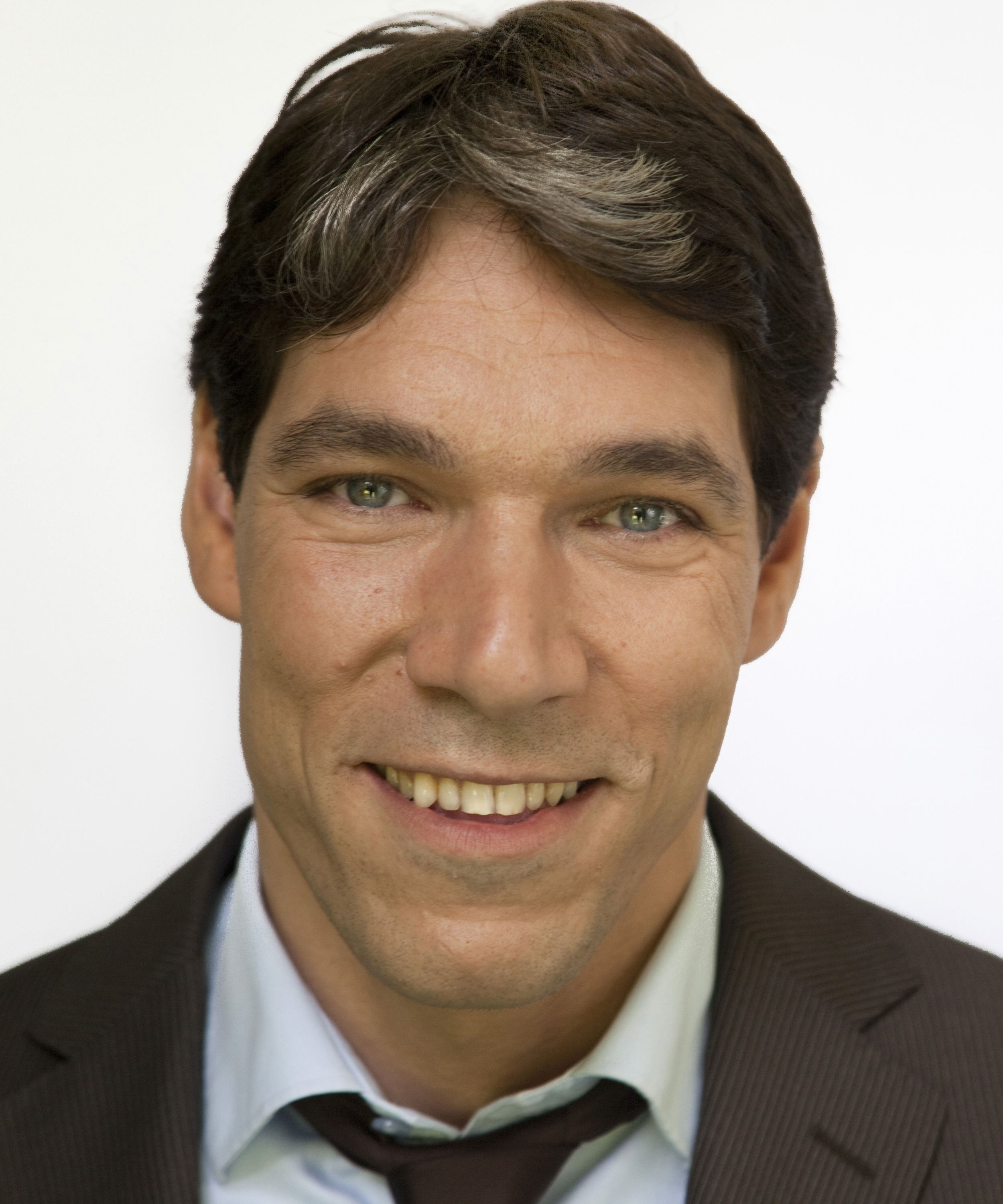
- El Fassed in 2010

Member of the House of Representatives of the Netherlands
- In office 17 June 2010 – 19 September 2012

Personal details
- Born: Arjan El Fassed; 5 August 1973 (age 53) Vlaardingen, Netherlands
- Party: GreenLeft (GroenLinks - GL)
- Spouse: Married
- Education: Leiden University (M.A., Political science)
- Occupation: Politician, development aid worker, human rights activist
- Website: (in Dutch) Arjan El Fassed

Arjan El Fassed (born 5 August 1973) is a former Dutch politician and human rights activist as well as development aid worker. As a member of GreenLeft (GroenLinks) he was an MP from 17 June 2010 to 19 September 2012. He focused on matters of development aid, foreign policy, digital rights, open data and transparency.

== Biography ==
El Fassed studied political science at Leiden University and worked as a lobbyist and advisor for several human rights and humanitarian organizations, among others Palestinian Society for the Protection of Human Rights (LAW), the Interchurch Organisation for Development Cooperation (ICCO), Oxfam Novib as well as Oxfam International.

He is co-founder of The Electronic Intifada (EI), a website that provides a Palestinian point of view on the Israeli-Palestinian conflict. He quit his involvement with the site in 2009.

In 2007 El Fassed was involved in a spoof involving a letter allegedly written by Nelson Mandela to The New York Times journalist Thomas Friedman. The letter made comparison between South African apartheid to Israel's treatment of Palestinians. The memo was widely cited even by former American President Jimmy Carter. In 2007, political writer Joel Pollak reported that the memo was drafted by El Fassed who eventually wrote his own blog post professing that the memo was in fact his own creation.

From June 2010 until September 2012, he was a member of the Dutch House of Representatives. Since 2013, he is director of the Open State Foundation, a non-profit organization based in the Netherlands that promotes democratic transparency, accountability and participation with the development of online platforms and promotes unlocking and re-use of open (government) data.

== Bibliography ==
- 2008: Niet iedereen kan stenen gooien: Een Nederlandse Palestijn op zoek naar zijn wortels en identiteit, ISBN 978-90-8645-027-5

== Awards ==
- 2011: Fair Politician of the Year 2010-2011, Evert Vermeer Foundation
