= Palestine Chronicle =

American organization and news website

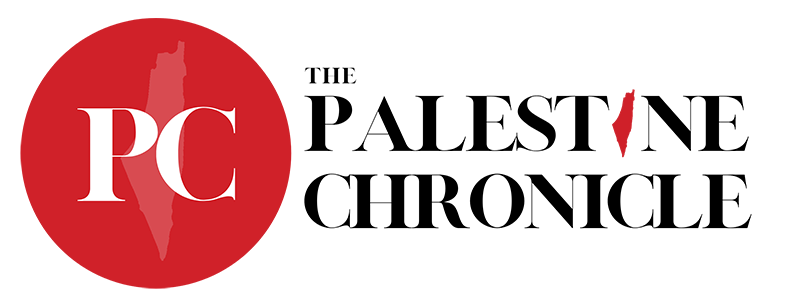

- Screenshot Screenshot of Palestine Chronicle on October 8, 2025
- Company type: Non-profit organization
- Website type: News website
- Founded: 1999
- Headquarters: Mountlake Terrace, Washington
- Country of origin: United States
- Founder: Ramzy Baroud
- Website: www.palestinechronicle.com
- Current status: Active

The Palestine Chronicle, also known as People Media Project, is an American nonprofit news website that covers local and international news related to Palestine, reporting from a Palestinian perspective. The organization was founded in September 1999 by Palestinian-American journalist Ramzy Baroud.

== Background ==
Palestine Chronicle was established as a website in September 1999 by Palestinian-American journalist and writer Ramzy Baroud, who was born in a refugee camp in the Gaza Strip. The site consisted of several sections: book reviews, photographs, analysis, and the "daily news" section in which Palestinians shared their experiences of life under Israeli-occupied territories. The Palestine Chronicle sought to hire "talented" writers living in the country to write their life stories for the website. Ramzy Baroud works as the director and editor-in-chief of the Palestine Chronicle, he also received a PhD in Palestine studies from the University of Exeter and was a former writer for Middle East Eye and The Brunei Times.

Baroud, in a 2020 interview with the Israeli Committee Against House Demolitions, said he was motivated to create Palestine Chronicle after being frustrated by perceived excessive pro-Israeli coverage in the mainstream media. He says that when the website was founded, it was a blog run only by him, but he gradually hired more and more editors, eventually turning Palestine Chronicle into a news company. He said it became one of the main sources focused on Palestine, alongside The Electronic Intifada. He also shared that the website was available in the French language back then.

== Work and reception ==
Palestine Chronicle is a non-profit organization (501(c) organization) and states its mission as reporting on "human rights, national struggles, freedom and democracy". It covers local and international news related to Palestine from the country's perspective. Its staff consists of independent and professional writers. The editorial board of the website listed Noam Chomsky, Hanan Ashrawi and Neve Gordon as its contributors. An article written by Palestine Chronicle staff said that it has journalists in the Gaza Strip and in West Bank and that it has a "very small" budget dependent on donations from readers.

The Arab Media & Society journal described Palestine Chronicle as an alternative and independent pro-Palestinian outlet that does not align with any political movements in Palestine and advocates for nonviolent resistance against Israel in its reporting.

In May 2014, Victoria Brittain included Palestine Chronicle in a list of news outlets she thinks successfully reported the "counter-narrative" of the Israeli–Palestinian conflict. Palestine Chronicle articles have been cited by The Guardian. The Massachusetts Institute of Technology website listed it as a "recommended" news outlet on the Israeli-Palestinian conflict. Common Dreams called the website "modest, independent publication" in August 2025.

The website's articles were part of a case study in July 2025 by the Arab Media & Society journal, which compared it to Haaretz in its reportage of the Great March of Return.

== Lawsuits ==
In 2024 Republican politicians demanded a DOJ investigation and asked the IRS to revoke Palestine Chronicle's 501(c) status, accusing it of supporting Hamas due to its affiliation with freelance writer Abdullah al-Jamal, who was accused of holding Israeli hostages and was killed in the Nuseirat rescue and massacre on June 8, 2024. Palestine Chronicle rejected the accusation that al-Jamal held Israeli hostages and reported inconsistencies in the Israeli narrative, while CNN cited neighbors saying his family was known to have ties to Hamas. In July 2024, court records showed a former hostage filed a lawsuit alleging the Chronicle "aided, abetted, and materially supported" al-Jamal and Hamas. In January 2025, Judge Tiffany Cartwright dismissed the suit, ruling there was insufficient evidence the Chronicle knew of al-Jamal's alleged Hamas affiliation, that his articles were protected under the First Amendment, and that the outlet had not financed or directed terrorism. In October 2025, Israeli scholar Anat Alon-Beck filed a separate lawsuit alleging the Chronicle aided Hamas, which Ramzy Baroud described as an attempt to "silence" the outlet for reporting on Palestine.

== See also ==
- History of Palestinian journalism
- List of newspapers in Palestine
