= Black Agenda Report =

Black American news outlet

- Logo of BAR

- Home page of BAR on April 29, 2025
- Founder(s): Glen Ford, Bruce A. Dixon, Nellie Bailey, Margaret Kimberly, and Leutisha Stills
- Editor-in-chief: Margaret Kimberley
- Founded: October 25 2006
- Country: United States
- Website: www.blackagendareport.com

Black Agenda Report (BAR) is a Black American news outlet and radio program launched in October 25 2006.

== Content ==
Black Agenda Report concerns topics such as "women's rights issues, history, business, sports, and entertainment" from a Black American perspective. It is an independent, alternative, Black-owned, left-wing publication which denounces both the Democratic and Republican parties, positioning itself as an outsider. Its associated website publishes political commentary and reporting in both blog posts and more extensive articles.

== History ==
Black Agenda Report was founded as a radio and TV program on October 25 2006 by Glen Ford, Bruce A. Dixon, Nellie Bailey, Margaret Kimberly, and Leutisha Stills. Ford had previously worked at the program Black Commentator, but left in 2006 to form the Report with other previous staff members. During the presidency of Barack Obama, journalists of the outlet severely criticized the president and accused him of being backed by corporations. Along with Facing South, the Report was the only media outlet to provide major coverage of the 2010 Georgia prison strike.

== Criticism ==
Netherlands-based investigative journalism group Bellingcat described BAR as one of several blogs and websites that "routinely promote pro-Assad conspiracy theories", in regards to the website being given the Serena Shim Award for Uncompromised Integrity, an award presented by the pro-Assad group Association for Investment in Popular Action Committees, describing one of its fronts, the Syria Solidarity Movement, as anti-semitic and fascist. Bellingcat also criticized the website for claiming the Sudanese revolution was a regime change operation.

Other publications have criticized BAR for denying the Persecution of Uyghurs in Xinjiang. Coda Story identified the website as part of a fringe group of leftists who deny the persecution, citing a January 2020 piece by contributing editor Danny Haiphong, who denied the existence of "concentration camps" in Xinjiang after a tour of the country. World Magazine also criticized editor and columnist Margaret Kimberly for denying the existence of re-education camps, in which she tweeted: "These are lies. There is no evidence of Uighur ‘concentration camps.’ More hybrid war against China." Kimberley also appeared on the Chinese state-controlled television network CGTN, where she stated that the US was "in no position to talk about human rights in China or anywhere else" due to its high incarceration rate.

African-American studies scholar Molefi Kete Asante has opposed the BAR as a Marxist publication contrary to Afrocentricity and Pan-Africanism, deeming it a '"black" Marxist propagandistic instrument that is both anemic and corrupt.' Asante furthermore alleged to have received ad hominem attacks from Ford and BAR in response to his criticisms.
