= Ramzy Baroud =

American-Palestinian journalist and writer (born 1972)

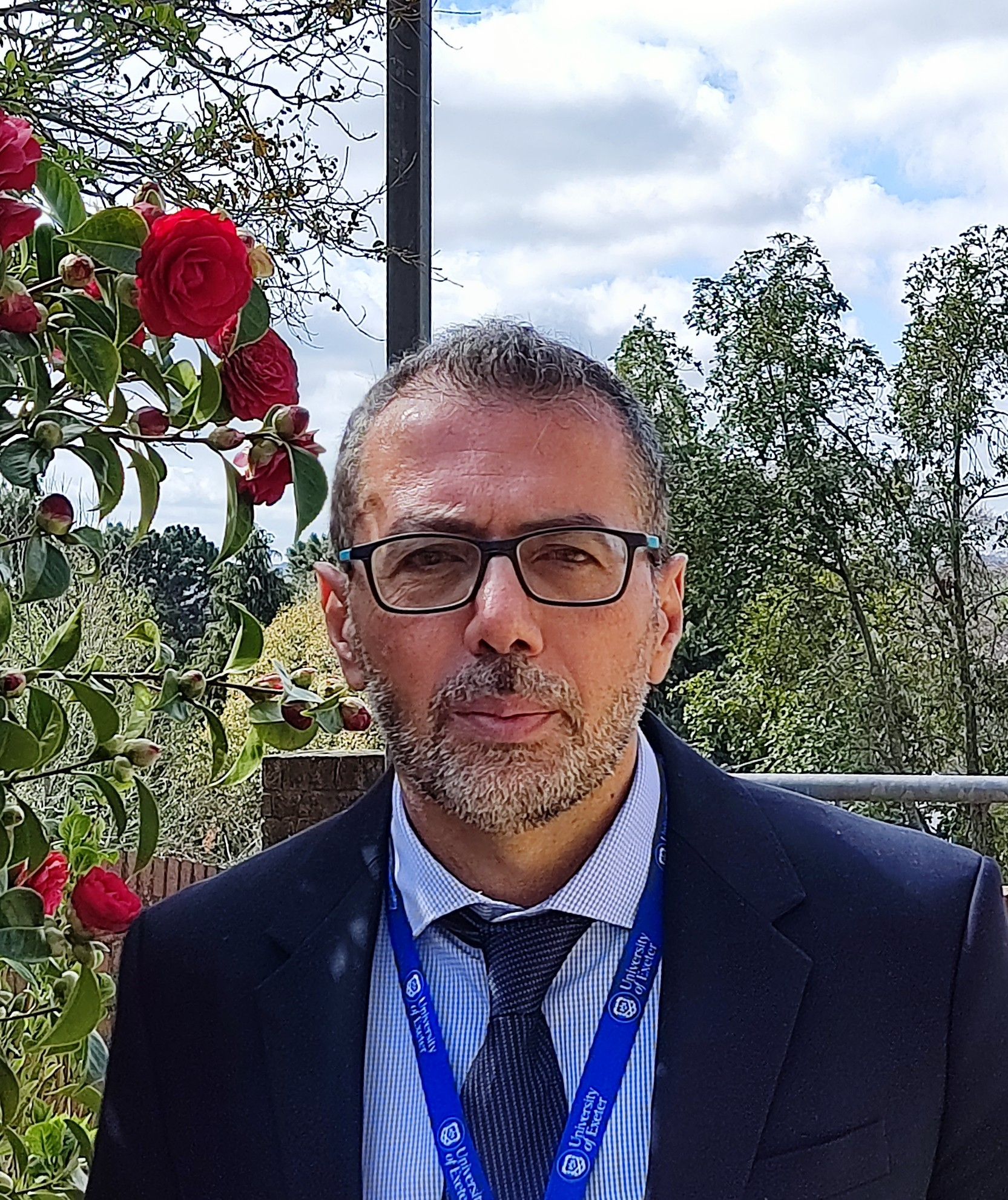
Ramzy Baroud in 2023

Ramzy Baroud (born 1972) is an American-Palestinian journalist and writer. He is the author of several books on the Israel-Palestinian conflict and the founder of news website Palestine Chronicle.

== Early life and background ==
His father came from the village of Bayt Daras, just south of Jaffa. In 1948, when his father was 9 years old, the Baroud family was driven out and finished up as refugees in the Gaza Strip. His father became an autodidact with a particular passion for Russian literature.

Baroud was born in 1972 (Note: "I was born on July 22, 1972. The midwife who helped bring me into the world was an old refugee woman, the same midwife that helped deliver my siblings," (Baroud 2010, p. 95)) and raised in the Nuseirat refugee camp in the Gaza Strip, where from age 6, he attended an UNWRA Elementary School for Boys. The school was separated from Bureiji refugee camp by an Israeli military encampment, whose soldiers frequently handcuffed and detained students for displaying pictures of the Palestinian flag. (Note: Baroud challenges as a myth the common perception that Israeli politics has a separate pro-peace leftist party and rightwing hostile to compromise. Most of the abuses of the occupation were instituted by the Israeli Labor Party. He notes that the offer in the Oslo Accords of the right of Palestinians to have a flag and national anthem was just a "symbolic achievement" (Sharabani 2016).) One of his UNWRA schoolmates, Raed Muanis, was shot dead by Israeli soldiers when they sighted him running with one such small flag. As a high-school student he joined other youths in throwing stones when the First Intifada broke out and IDF soldiers would shoot their way. (Note: "Engulfed by my own rebellious feelings, I picked up another stone, and a third. I moved forward, even as bullets flew, even as my friends began falling all around me. I could finally articulate who I was, and for the first time on my own terms. My name was Ramzy, and I was the son of Mohammed, a freedom fighter from Nuseirat, who was driven out of his village of Beit Daras, and a grandson of a peasant who died with a broken heart and was buried beside the grave of my brother, a little boy who died because there was no medicine in the refugee camp's UN clinic. My mother was Zarefah, a refugee who couldn't spell her name, whose illiteracy was compensated for by a heart overflowing with love for her children and her people, a woman who had the patience of a prophet. I was a free boy; in fact, I was a free man" (Atzmon 2010; Baroud 2010, p. 132))

He has recounted much of his family's history, within the wider historical context of the creation of the Palestinian refugee problem since 1948, in his memoir, My Father was a Freedom Fighter which has been highly praised by Richard Falk (Note: "A deeply moving chronicle of the persisting Palestinian ordeal. This book, more than any I have read, tells me why anyone of conscience must stand in solidarity with the continuing struggle of the Palestinian people for self-determination and a just peace" (ICAHD 2020).) and by Gilad Atzmon who called it a "heartbreaking" "masterpiece" which narrates "a tragic journey of a rural self-sufficient population that is driven into total dispossession, humiliation and absolute poverty".

His elder sister Soma Baroud, who graduated in medicine at Aleppo and whose home in the Qarara area of Khan Younis was demolished by the Israeli army in September 2024, was assassinated the following month, on October 9, 2024, when an Israeli missile struck a taxi at the Bani Suhaila roundabout near Khan Younis, which was carrying her and some friends either to or from the hospital where she worked.

Baroud is a citizen of the United States.

== Career ==
In 1999, dissatisfied with the failure of mainstream outlets, including Palestinian news sources, to cover the day by day realities of Palestinian lives, in September he began a personal blog The Palestinian Chronicle, which became a newspaper of which he remains chief editor. He has served as managing editor of Middle East Eye, editor-in-chief of the Brunei Times and as a deputy managing editor of Aljazeera online and once headed Al Jazeera's English's Research and Studies department. He has also taught mass communication at the Malaysia Campus of Australia's Curtin University of Technology. In 2015, he received a PhD in Palestinian Studies at the University of Exeter with a doctorate on a "People's History of Palestine", under the direction of Ilan Pappé.

Baroud subscribes to the one-state solution and actively supports the One Democratic State Campaign.

== Books ==
Baroud is the author of five books, and the joint editor of a sixth. Some have prefaces or afterwords by Kathleen Christison and Bill Christison, Jennifer Loewenstein, Khalida Jarrar and Richard Falk.

- Baroud, Ramzy (2003). Searching Jenin: Eyewitness Accounts of the Israeli Invasion. Cune. ISBN 978-1-885-94234-0.
- — (2006). The Second Palestinian Intifada: A Chronicle of a People's Struggle. Pluto Press. ISBN 978-0-745-32547-7.
- — (2010). My Father Was a Freedom Fighter: Gaza's Untold Story. Pluto Press. ISBN 978-0-745-32882-9.
- — (2018). The Last Earth: A Palestinian Story. Pluto Press. ISBN 978-1-786-80288-0.
  Of this book, Noam Chomsky wrote: "In the finest tradition of people's history, these sensitive, painful and evocative pieces provide a human face to the painful saga of Palestinian torment and the remarkable courage and resilience of the victims".
- — (2019). These Chains Will Be Broken: Palestinian Stories of Struggle and Defiance in Israeli Prisons. SCB Distributors. ISBN 978-1-949-76210-5.
- —; Pappé, Ilan, eds. (2022). Our Vision for Liberation: Engaged Palestinian Leaders and Intellectuals Speak Out. Clarity Press. ISBN 978-1-949-76244-0.

== Sources ==
- "About Dr. Ramzy Baroud". Politics for the People.
- Atzmon, Gilad (February 5, 2010). "My Father was a Freedom Fighter: A Book Review". Foreign Policy Journal.
- Baroud, Ramzy (2010). My Father Was a Freedom Fighter: Gaza's Untold Story. Pluto Press. ISBN 978-0-745-32882-9.
- Baroud, Ramzy (October 16, 2017). "White men kill, brown men found guilty". Al Jazeera English.
- Baroud, Ramzy (2018). "Give the Palestinian People the Right to Tell Their Own Stories. Pluto Books interview". Pluto Books.
- Baroud, Ramzy (June 27, 2024b). "Growing up in Nuseirat – Where Massacres Become Routine". CounterPunch.
- Baroud, Ramzy (October 18, 2024a). "'Text Me You Haven't Died' – My Sister was the 166th Doctor to Be Murdered in Gaza". CounterPunch.
- "ICAHD UK Interview with Ramzy Baroud". ICAHD. November 24, 2020.
- McCann, Joe (August 23, 2023). "Ireland is a Pillar of Solidarity for Palestinians': Interview with Ramzy Baroud". Palestine Chronicle. BelfastMedia.com.
- Miles, Jim (April 20, 2010). "Review of Baroud 2010". Countercurrents.
- Sharabani, Soud (February 12, 2016). "Israeli Myths: An Interview with Ramzy Baroud". CounterPunch.
