= Glen Ford (journalist) =

American journalist (1949–2021)

- Born: Glen Rutherford; November 5, 1949; Jersey City, New Jersey, US
- Died: July 28, 2021 (aged 71); Manhattan, New York, US
- Occupations: Journalist, writer, radio and TV host and producer
- Known for: America’s Black Forum, Black Agenda Report
- Father: Rudy “The Deuce” Rutherford
- Website: www.blackagendareport.com

Glen Ford (born Glen Rutherford; November 5, 1949 – July 28, 2021), was an American journalist, who, along with Bruce Dixon and Margaret Kimberley, co-founded Black Agenda Report. He was a socialist, a Vietnam War-era military veteran and a member of the Black Panther Party. He served in the news media over many years in his professional life. He was the Capitol Hill, State Department and White House correspondent for the Mutual Black Network, an American radio network. He co-launched, produced, and hosted the first nationally syndicated Black news interview program on commercial television, America's Black Forum, in 1977.

== Personal life ==
Ford was born November 5, 1949, in Jersey City, New Jersey. His Irish American mother, Shirley (née Smith), was a civil rights activist from New Jersey; his father, Rudy “The Deuce” Rutherford, himself born in Richland, Georgia, was a Black Radio Hall of Fame inductee, the first Black man in the Deep South to host a non-gospel television program, Rocking with The Deuce. After his parents divorced, he spent parts of his childhood in both New Jersey and Georgia.

Ford died on July 28, 2021, at the age of 71, from cancer in Manhattan.

== Career ==
Ford began his radio career reading news wire copy at age 11. His first full-time position on-air was at a James Brown-owned radio station, WRDW in Augusta, Georgia. It was there that Brown shortened his name to 'Ford.'

After serving four years in the Army, he worked as a radio journalist in Georgia and Maryland, before taking a job in 1974 in Washington, D.C., with the Mutual Black Network.

Ford was highly critical of the candidacy and presidency of Barack Obama. During Obama's re-election campaign in 2012, in a discussion with sociologist Michael Eric Dyson, Ford said that "Obama is not the lesser of evils, but the more effective evil. And we base that on his record and also on his rhetoric at the convention."

Later in that debate he described Obama's foreign policy as imperialistic, pointing out that "this is one of the great historical legacies of the Obama administration. He has ignored international law, laws that have evolved over hundreds of years, ignored the sovereignty of nations."

On February 27, 2020, Ford delivered a speech to the conference of the United National Anti-War Coalition entitled "Black America, Endless War, and The Evil Genius of Russiagate". In this speech, he argued that Barack Obama's election represented a turning point in the support of black Americans for American interventionism; "Blacks remained in overwhelming opposition throughout the Iraq War. But, then came Obama. For the first time in U.S. polling history, Blacks were more in favor of bombing Syria, than whites."

In the same speech, he claimed that by reporting Russian interference in the 2016 United States presidential election, the Central Intelligence Agency had attempted to create "a real crisis of legitimacy for the whole bourgeois democratic system, in order to delegitimize, not just the Trump administration, but all dissent in the United States," and that this represented a transition by the Democrat Party to "the more aggressive War Party, and the party of censorship and fear-mongering: The New McCarthyite Party."

== Works ==
- The Big Lie: Analysis of U.S. Press Coverage of the Grenada Invasion. Prague: International Organization of Journalists, 1985.
- The Black Agenda. OR Books, 2021. ISBN 978-1682192900
