= Clarenceville School District =

School district in Michigan

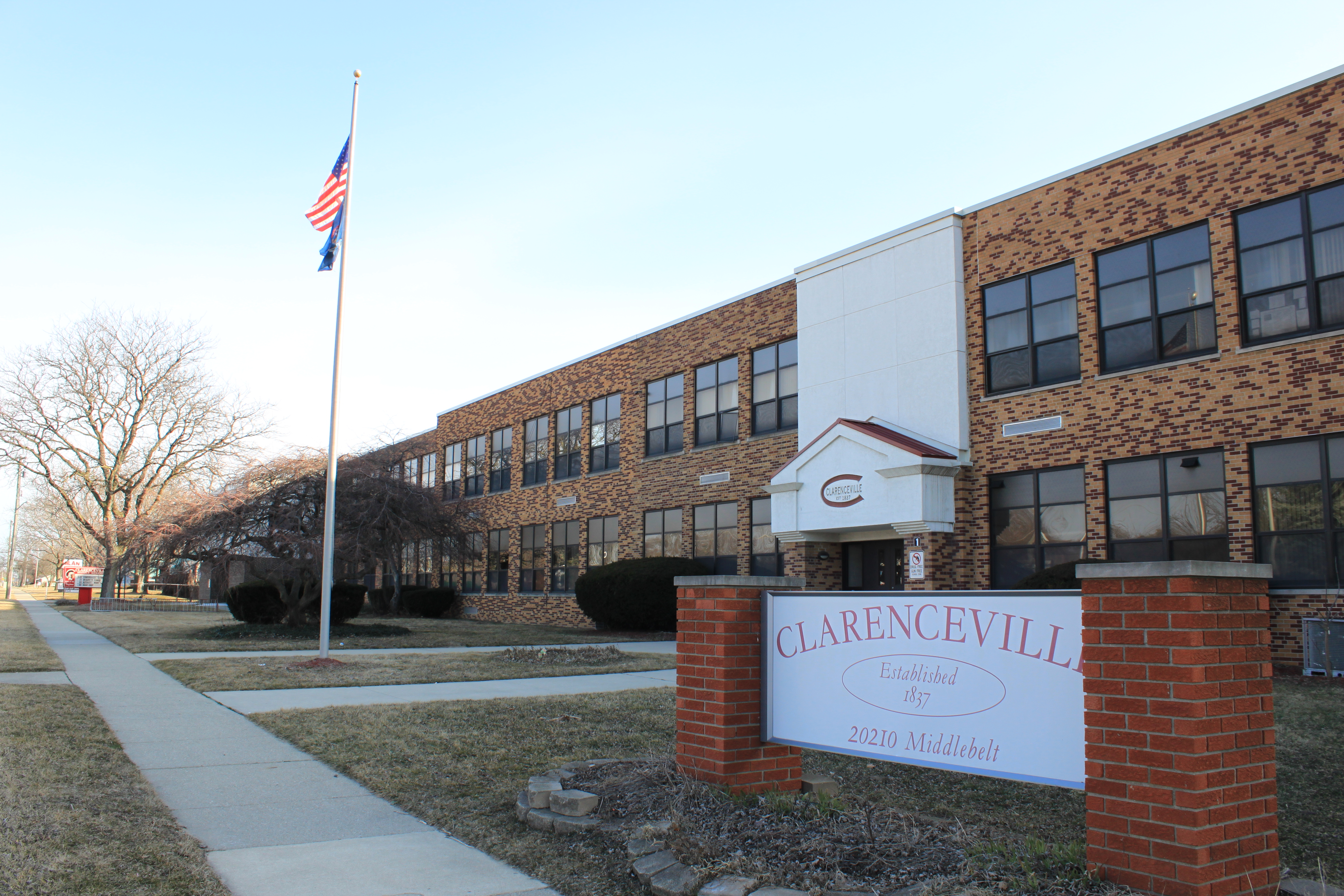
- Board of Education Building in Livonia

Address
- 20210 Middlebelt Road Livonia, Wayne County, Michigan, 48152; United States

District information
- Grades: Pre-Kindergarten-12
- Established: 1837
- Superintendent: Melissa Carruth
- Schools: 4
- Budget: $27,337,000 2022-2023 expenditures
- NCES District ID: 2609840

Students and staff
- Enrollment: 1,632 (2024-2025)
- Teachers: 113.55 (on an FTE basis) (2024-2025)
- Staff: 259.88 FTE (2024-2025)
- Student–teacher ratio: 14.37 (2024-2025)

Other information
- Website: www.clarenceville.k12.mi.us

Clarenceville High School
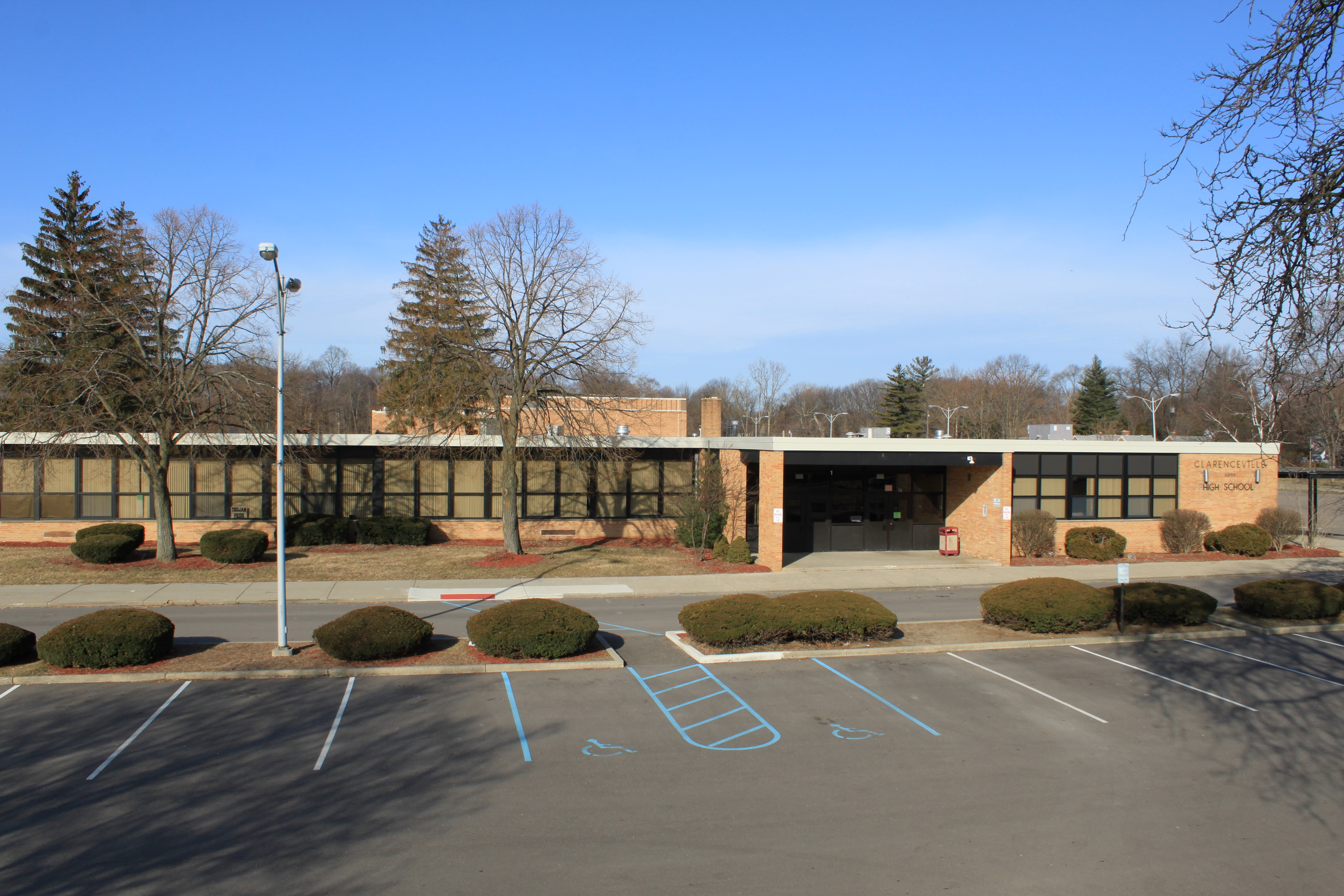
- Clarenceville High School

Location
- 20155 Middlebelt Road; Livonia, Michigan 48152

Information
- Type: Public school
- Established: 1949; 77 years ago
- School district: Clarenceville School District
- Principal: Todd Noonan and Terrence Blevins
- Grades: 9–12
- Enrollment: 612 (2023-2024)
- Colors: Gray and Red
- Athletics: http://ClarencevilleAthletics.Com JV/V Football, JV/V Volleyball, V Boys Soccer, Cheer; Wrestling, JV/V B&G Basketball, Cheer V Girls Soccer, V Baseball/Softball, Track and Field
- Athletics conference: Wayne-Oakland Conference (1951-1975) Metro-West Conference (1975-1982) and (1992-1994); Metro Conference (1983-1992) and (1994-2013) Western Wayne Athletic Conference (Starting in 2013)
- Mascot: Trojan
- Team name: Trojans
- Accreditation: North Central Association
- Website: Clarenceville High School

The Clarenceville School District is a public school district in Metro Detroit in the U.S. state of Michigan, serving portions of Farmington Hills, Livonia, and Redford.

== Etymology ==
The school district's name was derived from the former town of Clarenceville which took up some territory in Farmington Hills. It is believed that since the town of Clarenceville was in Oakland County, the school district is listed as being in that county despite having its schools in Wayne County. Two former elementary schools, Edgewood Elementary and Westbrook Elementary, were located in Farmington Hills, Oakland County, but were closed in the 1970s. The school also owns a parking lot where it stores its buses that is in Oakland County.

== History ==
Clarenceville Middle School began as the district's high school. A new high school was built across Middlebelt Road from the former high school around 1958.

In 1955, the high school student council took up the issue of certain styles of dancing that some students were concerned was "in bad taste and made all of them look 'cheap' to outsiders," according to a student quote in the Detroit Free Press. The council banned bebop and Jitterbug dancing but allowed "the bunny hug, lindy hop, Big Apple, and the Lambeth Walk, etc.—but there will have to be a drastic reduction of 'jumping and grimacing.'" The student council's decision did not satisfy district leadership, as they banned more dancing styles later that month. The school gained a reputation as "for squares" and parents demanded that the school board reconsider, which they did during a three-hour discussion at a meeting in April 1956. Styles of "fast dancing" such as the Chicken were allowed once again.

A pedestrian bridge was built in 1968 to connect the high school site and middle school site. The high school was also expanded in 1967-1968 with a new auditorium, classrooms, and a 100-seat audio-visual room for showing movies.

Clarenceville High School shares a Michigan historical marker with its adjoined 919-person auditorium, named for a longtime school superintendent and Michigan House Representative.

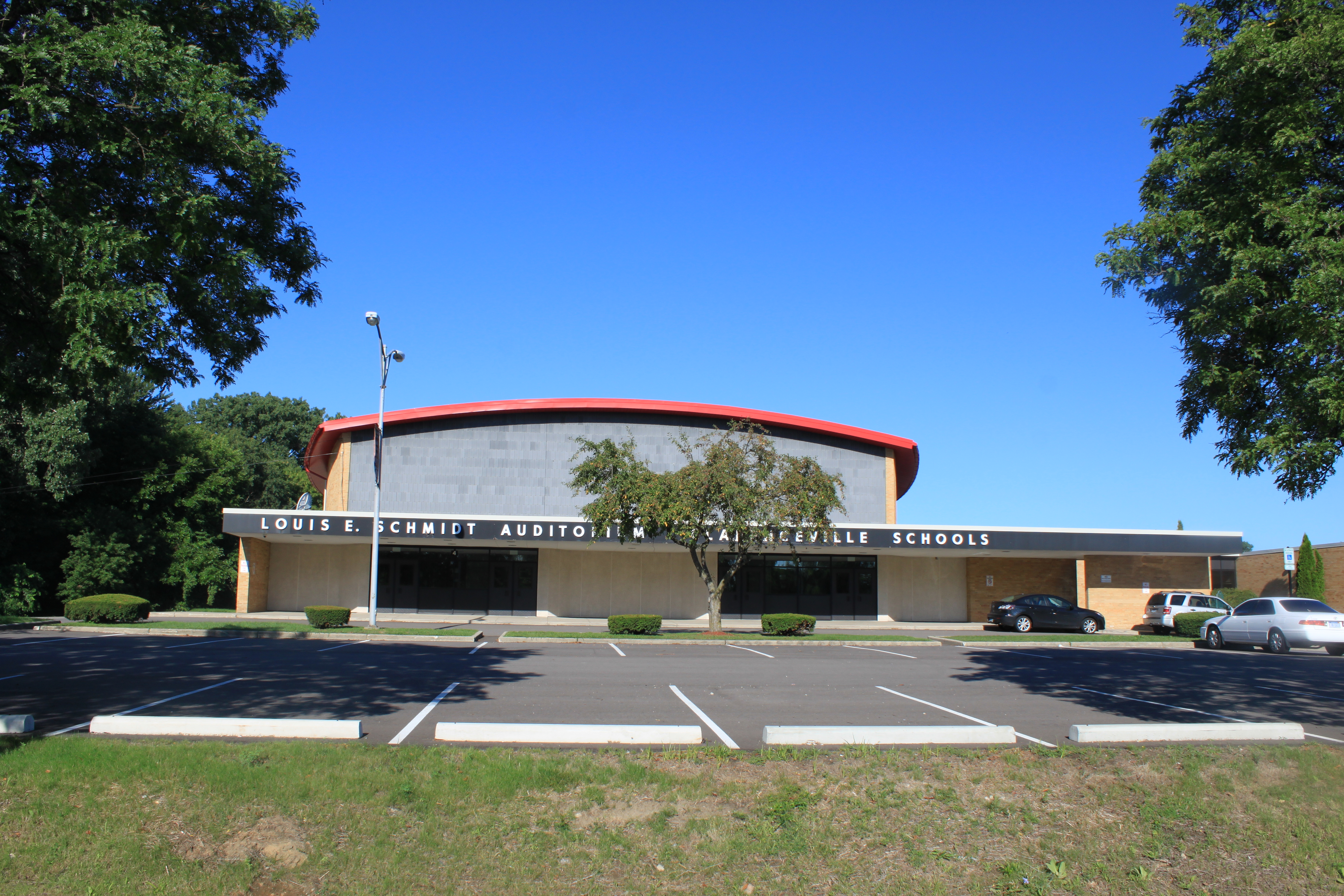
The Louis E. Schmidt Auditorium

The auditorium's history as a major music venue began with the Clarenceville Jazz Series, run by Detroit jazz maven Midge Ellis from 1969 to 1982. During that time, such acts as Buddy Rich, Stan Kenton, Woody Herman, Harry James, Gene Krupa, Lionel Hampton, and Maynard Ferguson performed and conducted workshops for students at the high school. The Clarenceville Jazz Band program continued until just a few years before Ellis' death at the age of 91, in 2015.

== Athletics ==
The nickname of Clarenceville Middle and High School's sports teams are the Trojans.

Students of the Clarenceville School District are considered Livonia residents for the purposes of the Livonia Hockey Association whether or not they and their families live within the city limits of Livonia, MI.

== Schools ==
Schools in Clarenceville School District
School	Address	Notes
Clarenceville High School	20155 Middlebelt Road, Livonia	Grades 9–12
Clarenceville Middle School	20210 Middlebelt Road, Livonia	Grades 6–8
Botsford Elementary	19515 Lathers, Livonia	Grades PreK–5
Grandview Elementary	19814 Louise Street, Livonia	Grades PreK–5

== Notable alumni ==
- Timothy Shaw, former NFL linebacker for four teams
- Serena Shim, journalism and war correspondent for Press TV
