= American University of Technology =

Private university in Byblos, Lebanon

American University of Technology (AUT)
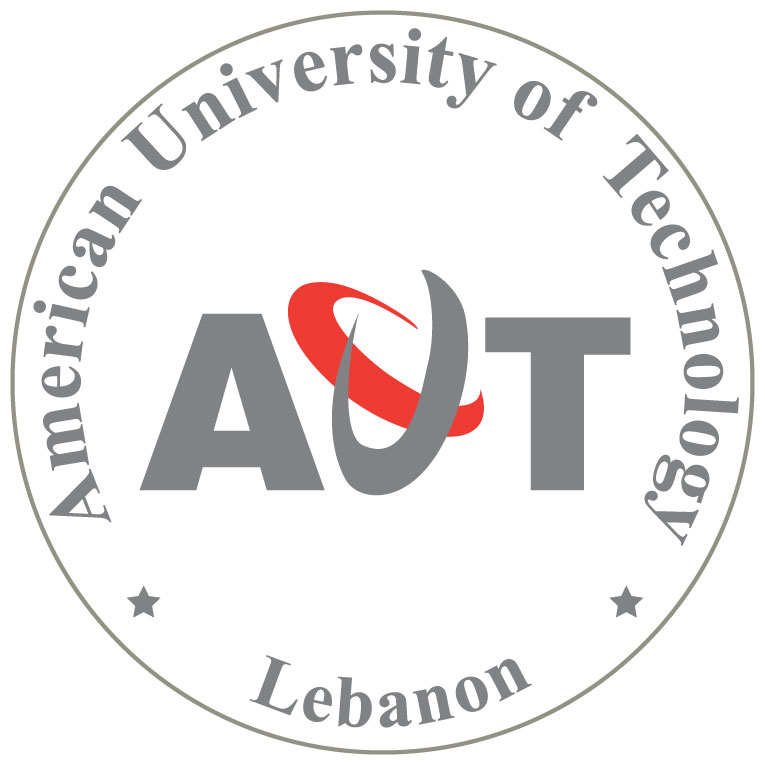
- Type: Private
- Established: 1998
- Affiliations: AACRAO the American Association of Collegiate Registrars and Admissions Officers
- President: Ghada Hinain
- Students: 3000
- Location: Byblos, Lebanon; 34°25′25″N 35°49′57″E
- Campus: Urban
- Website: www.aut.edu

American University of Technology (AUT), is a private university established in Lebanon. It was founded in 1998 by Ghada Hinain near Byblos. The university is directed by an appointed Board of Trustees.

AUT's mission is to provide non-sectarian American higher education opportunities to qualified students from rural villages and towns between Beirut and Tripoli. Most of AUT's students work and receive financial aid.

== History ==
The American University of Technology was established in 1998 under the name of American University College of Technology (AUCT), as an external degree program with State University of New York /Empire State College in New York City. It was subsequently chartered as a non-profit, non-sectarian, co-educational institution of higher learning in the state of Delaware.

In December 2007, the word "College" was dropped from the name and the university was renamed "The American University of Technology" by a governmental decree from the Ministry of Higher Education. The medium of instruction is English.

== Undergraduate programs ==
AUT offers degrees in graphic design, computer technology, business, and mass communications.

- Accounting
- Audio Visual Arts
- Business Computing
- Business Management
- Civil Engineering (University of Dayton)
- Computer and Communication Science
- Computer Science
- Electrical Engineering (University of Dayton )
- Environmental Health
- Finance
- Graphic Design
- Hospitality Management
- Information Technology
- Interior Design
- Journalism
- Marketing and Advertising
- Mechanical Engineering ( University of Dayton )
- Nutrition
- Public Relations
- Radio TV
- Transport and Logistics Management
- Water Resources and Geo-environmental Science

== Graduate programs ==
- MBA
- MS in Finance
- Master of Economics of International Tourism

== Affiliations ==
- Université de Toulouse 1- Capitole: A Master program in Economics of International Tourism is offered jointly by both universities in the scope of the memorandum of understanding signed in June 2009.
- The Lebanese University: An exchange agreement for faculty, students and joint projects and research has been concluded. It covers the Bachelor, Master and PhD programs.
- The University of London: An agreement provides for AUT to offer support to students enrolled with University of London in the Master of Laws- LLM program.
- University of Dayton, Ohio, USA: An articulation agreement allows students to start Engineering Bachelor programs at AUT for two years and continue with the University of Dayton for the remaining two years.
- Davenport University, Michigan, USA: offer students an opportunity for graduate studies in Business Administration with concentrations in Strategic Management and Health Care Management.
- Davenport University is accredited by North Central Association of Colleges and Schools (NCA)
- Erasmus University Rotterdam (The Center for Maritime Economics and Logistics): A cooperation agreement ensures the teaching of specialization courses in the areas of shipping, transport and logistics by top faculty from MEL to AUT students majoring in Transport management and Logistics.
- State University of New York Empire State College: An academic affiliation agreement allows students at AUT to complete bachelor programs with SUNY Empire State College without the need to travel to the US.
- Oklahoma University: An agreement on educational cooperation allows the exchange of students and faculty, joint research and publications. Students may decide to join OU for a semester or two and have their credits earned at OU integrated on their AUT transcripts.
- Istituto Europeo di Design (IED) in Milan, Italy: Students can benefit from the possibility of exchange in all design programs including Fashion Design in addition to Graphic, Interior, Product and Car Design.
- New York College: Students can also benefit from an exchange agreement with New York College in Athens, Thessaloniki (Greece) and Prague (Czech Republic).
- Institut Universitaire Kurt Bosch (IUKB) in Switzerland: IUKB offers its Executive MBA in Tourism Management to students living in Lebanon through an academic agreement with AUT and New York College of Greece.
- CISCO: AUT is a Cisco Academy and provides training and testing leading to certification from CISCO in all network specializations.
- Microsoft: AUT is an IT Academy for Microsoft, offering courses and testing leading to certification from Microsoft.

== Notable alumni ==
- Serena Shim, journalism and war correspondent for Press TV

== See also ==
- American University (disambiguation) for a list of similarly named institutions
- AUC Press
- Cairo International Model United Nations
- American University of Sharjah (AUS)
- American University of Beirut (AUB)
- American University of Iraq - Sulaimani (AUI)
- American University in Dubai (AUD)
