= Vanessa Beeley =

Blogger, writer and photographer

- Born: 1963/1964
- Occupations: Blogger; Activist
- Known for: Sharing conspiracy theories and disinformation related to the Syrian civil war
- Father: Harold Beeley

Vanessa Beeley (born 1963/1964) is a British activist and blogger known for sharing conspiracy theories and disinformation about the Syrian civil war and about the Syrian volunteer organisation White Helmets.

== Early life and career ==
Beeley is the daughter of former British diplomat Harold Beeley. Initially, she worked as a consultant to a waste management company in the Middle East.

=== Activism ===
Beeley has lived in the Palestine territories, where she survived Israeli bombardments. In 2014, she started her blog titled The Wall Will Fall in which she supported the Palestinian cause.

Since 2015, Beeley has focused her activism on the Syrian civil war. She first visited Syria in July 2016. That year, she met Syrian President Bashar al-Assad in Damascus as part of a US Peace Council delegation, describing it as her "proudest moment". According to Bellingcat, Beeley was on the steering committee for the Syria Solidarity Movement. After visiting Syria, Beeley went to Moscow to meet Russia's deputy foreign minister Mikhail Bogdanov and director of information and press Maria Zakharova. An article by Janine di Giovanni in The New York Review of Books described Bogdanov as "Putin's point man on Syria".

Beeley has frequently appeared on the Russian government-owned networks RT and Sputnik commenting on the Syrian war.

In 2019, two of Beeley's planned talks at universities in Canada, organised by the Hamilton, Ontario chapter of the Stop the War Coalition, were cancelled after a backlash. The Université de Montréal said the room booked for the event was too small and it was concerned that the "event would not go off peacefully".

=== Journalism ===
Beeley has been an associate editor of the conspiracy website 21st Century Wire. She has also written articles for MintPress News and American Herald Tribune.

In 2019, she received the "Serena Shim Award for Uncompromised Integrity in Journalism" from the Association for Investment in Popular Action Committees, which Bellingcat describes as a "pro-Assad lobby group".

Beeley has claimed to have been a finalist for the Martha Gellhorn Prize for Journalism, however, according to James Fox, a member of the prize committee, there are no finalists for the Gellhorn Prize, and only winners or special commendations are published.

== Views ==
Some of Beeley's controversial views include a belief that the human rights NGO Human Rights Watch is a "fake" group, that the Charlie Hebdo shooting in Paris was a false flag operation, and that al-Qaeda was not responsible for the September 11 attacks.

=== Syria ===
Beeley is a member of the Working Group on Syria, Propaganda and Media which has attracted criticism for disputing the veracity of the use of chemical weapons in the Syrian Civil War.

In February 2018, Beeley encouraged her readers to report a list of news outlets and journalists – including the BBC, Channel 4 News and The Guardian – for allegedly violating the UK Terrorism Act. The journalists and media outlets listed by Beeley had all been critical of Syrian president Bashar al-Assad.

In leaked private chats, Beeley admitted knowing that the Syrian government engages in torture, but said that she would never publicly state so.

==== White Helmets ====
Beeley has accused the White Helmets, a Syrian humanitarian organisation that operated in parts of opposition-controlled Syria and in Turkey, of being a fraudulent terrorist organisation that engages in organ harvesting, and that its volunteers are a legitimate military target. In 2017, referencing Beeley's false claims, the Russian government submitted a report to the United Nations Security Council that linked the White Helmets to al-Qaeda. Eight countries on the Security Council rejected Russia's submission, saying that the White Helmets are an "impartial, neutral group".

Middle East experts have dismissed Beeley's allegations that the White Helmets are linked to al-Qaeda and that the group engages in organ harvesting. Fact-checking website Snopes gave a rating of "false" for Beeley's claim that the White Helmets were linked to terrorists.

According to data analyst organisations Graphika and Hoaxy, in 2018 Beeley was among the most influential figures in spreading content online about the White Helmets.

==== Syrian chemical weapons ====
Beeley is a member of the Working Group on Syria, Propaganda and Media which alleges that the 2018 Douma chemical attack was staged by the White Helmets. She has claimed that the Syrian government has not carried out chemical weapon attacks. Experts from the OPCW-UN Joint Investigative Mechanism have stated that the Syrian Air Force was responsible for the 2017 Khan Shaykhun chemical attack. Beeley has claimed that the attack has been "debunked".

=== Accusations against MP Jo Cox ===
In 2017, Beeley called the deceased British MP Jo Cox – who had been murdered the previous year – an "al Qaeda advocate" and "warmongering Blairite".

=== COVID-19 ===
Beeley has shared conspiracy theories about the COVID-19 pandemic. She has alleged that Microsoft founder Bill Gates has ties to Imperial College London and asked if the UK government was "working for Bill Gates?".

== See also ==
- Eva Bartlett
- Working Group on Syria, Propaganda and Media
