= Arab Media & Society =

- Discipline: Communication, media studies
- Language: English
- Edited by: Hussein Amin, Editor in Chief; Sarah El-Shaarawi, Managing Editor; Mohamed Eslam, Arabic Section Editor; Abdallah Schleifer, Editor at Large

Publication details
- Former names: Transnational Broadcasting Studies, TBS Journal
- History: 1998-present
- Publisher: Adham Center for Television and Digital Journalism, American University in Cairo (Egypt)
- Frequency: Quarterly
- License: CC BY-NC-ND

Standard abbreviations
- ISO 4: Arab Media Soc.

Indexing
- ISSN: 1687-7721
- OCLC no.: 816372411

Links
- Journal homepage; Peer Reviewed

Arab Media & Society is an open access peer-reviewed academic journal covering studies on communication. The editor-in-chief is Hussein Amin (American University in Cairo) and it is published by the Adham Center for Television and Digital Journalism in the School of Global Affairs and Public Policy at the American University in Cairo. The journal was established in 1998. Abdallah Schleifer is an editor-at-large.
