= The Electronic Intifada =

Online pro-Palestinian news publication

- Screenshot Home page on April 22, 2025
- Website type: Online news publication
- Available in: English
- Owners: Middle East Cultural and Charitable Society
- Creators: Ali Abunimah; Arjan El Fassed; Laurie King; Nigel Parry
- Revenue: $746,000 (2023)
- Website: electronicintifada.net
- Commercial: No
- Launched: February 2001; 25 years ago
- Current status: Active

The Electronic Intifada (EI) is an online publication covering the Israeli–Palestinian conflict from a Palestinian perspective. It is published by the nonprofit organization the Middle East Cultural and Charitable Society, which is based in Chicago.

== History ==
EI was founded in February 2001 by Ali Abunimah, Arjan El Fassed, Laurie King, and Nigel Parry.

In April 2008, The Electronic Intifada published an article containing e-mails exchanged by members of the Committee for Accuracy in Middle East Reporting in America (CAMERA). The stated purpose of the group was "help[ing] us keep Israel-related entries on Wikipedia from becoming tainted by anti-Israel editors". Five Wikipedia editors involved in a CAMERA campaign were sanctioned by Wikipedia administrators, who wrote that the project's open nature "is fundamentally incompatible with the creation of a private group to surreptitiously coordinate editing by ideologically like-minded individuals".

After Al Jazeera decided not to publish The Lobby, its documentary about the pro-Israel political lobby in the US, The Electronic Intifada published a leaked version online in 2018.

=== Conflict with NGO Monitor over Dutch funding ===
In 2010, the Jerusalem-based pro-Israel organization NGO Monitor criticized the Dutch Interchurch Organisation for Development Cooperation (ICCO) for providing financial support to The Electronic Intifada, which it said was antisemitic and compared Israeli policies with those of the Nazi regime. Gerald M. Steinberg, head of the organization, described The Electronic Intifada as "an explicitly pro-Palestinian political and ideological Web site" that hosts "anti-Israel propaganda." Marinus Verweij, chairman of ICCO's executive board said "The EI reports frequently about the violations of human rights and international humanitarian law by the State of Israel. In no way is the EI anti-Israel or anti-Semitic." He described The Electronic Intifada as "an important source of information from the occupied Palestinian territories" frequently used by newspapers such as The Washington Post and the Financial Times.

Dutch Foreign Ministry spokesman Ward Bezemer stated that whether ICCO had promoted antisemitism, a criminal offence, is to be determined by the Public Prosecutor on the basis of Dutch law. On 26 November 2010, Dutch Foreign Minister Uri Rosenthal, who is Jewish and has an Israeli wife, said: "I will look into the matter personally. If it appears that the government subsidized NGO ICCO does fund The Electronic Intifada, it will have a serious problem with me." Rosenthal later told IKON radio that "anti-semitism is not the issue" but "my concern about calls to contribute to boycotts and embargoes".

EI co-founder MP Arjan El-Fassed, who also wrote for the website Al-Awda, told the Dutch newspaper De Volkskrant that the complaint by NGO Monitor was related to one quote from an interview with Jewish Holocaust survivor and anti-Zionist Hajo Meyer in June 2009. Meyer told EI: "I can write up an endless list of similarities between Nazi Germany and Israel." In the same article, the Director of the Centre for Information and Documentation Israel (CIDI), Ronnie Naftaniel, said that The Electronic Intifada is not an antisemitic website. He stated that, while everybody should be free to express their opinion, the Dutch government should not indirectly fund a website that regularly calls for a boycott of Israel.

On 14 January 2011, ICCO decided not to change its policy after a discussion held with the Dutch foreign minister. In response to ICCO's decision, The Jerusalem Post reported that Dutch Foreign Minister Uri Rosenthal "will monitor ICCO's activities. He will consider this as a minus when he makes up the balance when ICCO applies again in a new subsidies round," as said by Ward Bezemer, a spokesman for Rosenthal." Partos, a national umbrella for more than a hundred Dutch civil society organizations in the international development cooperation sector, strongly condemned Rosenthal's threats to ICCO's funding. "Rosenthal's position vis-à-vis ICCO creates a dangerous precedent for the future. Development organisations will have to continue to fight for an independent voice in the debate. Partos will ... stand up for that."

In April 2011, Professor of International Cooperation Studies Paul Hoebink argued that Foreign Minister Uri Rosenthal has no say in Dutch government funding to ICCO because Minister Ben Knapen holds the portfolio. In addition, ICCO's contribution to The Electronic Intifada is paid with ICCO's own funds. Professor of International Law and Dutch politicians for the Labour Party, Nico Schrijver considered Rosenthal's threat to cut government funding if ICCO continues its financial support to The Electronic Intifada as very worrying.

== Reception ==
Daoud Kuttab described EI as a pro-Palestinian website and part of the new media in the Arab world.

According to Foreign Policy, EI was a site that encouraged media activism and was part of the pro-Palestine camp of the Middle East conflict's cyberfront, opposite the pro-Israel Israel Support Group.

Gil Sedan, a Jewish Telegraphic Agency reporter in 2001, described EI as a "cyberpropaganda" site which "may contribute to a better understanding of the Palestinian cause," but also said that it "is too biased to be of much use to mainstream publications."

Hannah Brown of The Jerusalem Post in 2002 described EI as "one of the most elaborate" sites giving a "Palestinian perspective of the news". According to Brown, EI is a "very professional, user-friendly and well written" website. At this time, it included photographs "such as a picture of a lone, small Palestinian boy aiming a stone at an Israeli tank."

Political journalist Alexander Cockburn stated in The Nation in 2000: "there are a number of excellent news outlets for those who want unjaundiced reporting" describing The Electronic Intifada, and Middle East Research and Information Project, as "trustworthy".

NRC Handelsblad, a Dutch major mainstream newspaper, recommended The Electronic Intifada to its readers in 2006 at the height of the war on Lebanon. NRC wrote, "The Electronic Intifada (EI), a news site in English, reports from a Palestinian perspective, but as impartial as possible. EI is often faster than the established media."

In 2025, The Forward described EI's approach as emulating the pro-Israeli Committee for Accuracy in Middle East Reporting and Analysis (CAMERA).

== See also ==
- International Middle East Media Center
- Palestine Chronicle
- History of Palestinian journalism
