= Peace Data =

Russian news website

Peace Data or PeaceData is a fake news website run by the Internet Research Agency, a Russian outlet connected to the country's government, which publishes in English and Arabic.

== History ==
Part of its object was to interfere in the 2020 United States elections with the intention of helping Donald Trump to be re-elected by defeating the Democratic candidate Joe Biden and his running mate Kamala Harris. The aim was to reduce support for the Biden-Harris ticket among liberal voters. According to Graphika, a social media analytics firm, only about 5 percent of the website's English-language content concerned the American elections, but "this facet of the operation suggests an attempt to build a left-wing audience and steer it away from Biden's campaign". It also targeted left-wing voters in the UK, and featured articles about Algeria, Egypt and Turkey. The website hired unsuspecting journalists in the United States as well as inventing false personas with computer created avatars. These fake identities included the three permanent staff members listed on the website, according to Graphika.

Steve Topple, a writer for the UK left-wing website The Canary, provided columns for PeaceData, for example in one describing Belarus's exiled opposition leader Svetlana Tikhanovskaya as “little more than a Western regime change puppet.”

On September 1, 2020, Facebook and Twitter announced they had been warned by the Federal Bureau of Investigation about the disinformation effort and said they had removed or suspended accounts associated with it. The Daily Beast website reported that the operation tried and failed to place content with Jacobin, In These Times and Truthout.

== See also ==
- List of fake news websites
- Russian interference in the 2020 United States elections
