= Paul Larudee =

Iranian-born American political activist (born 1946)

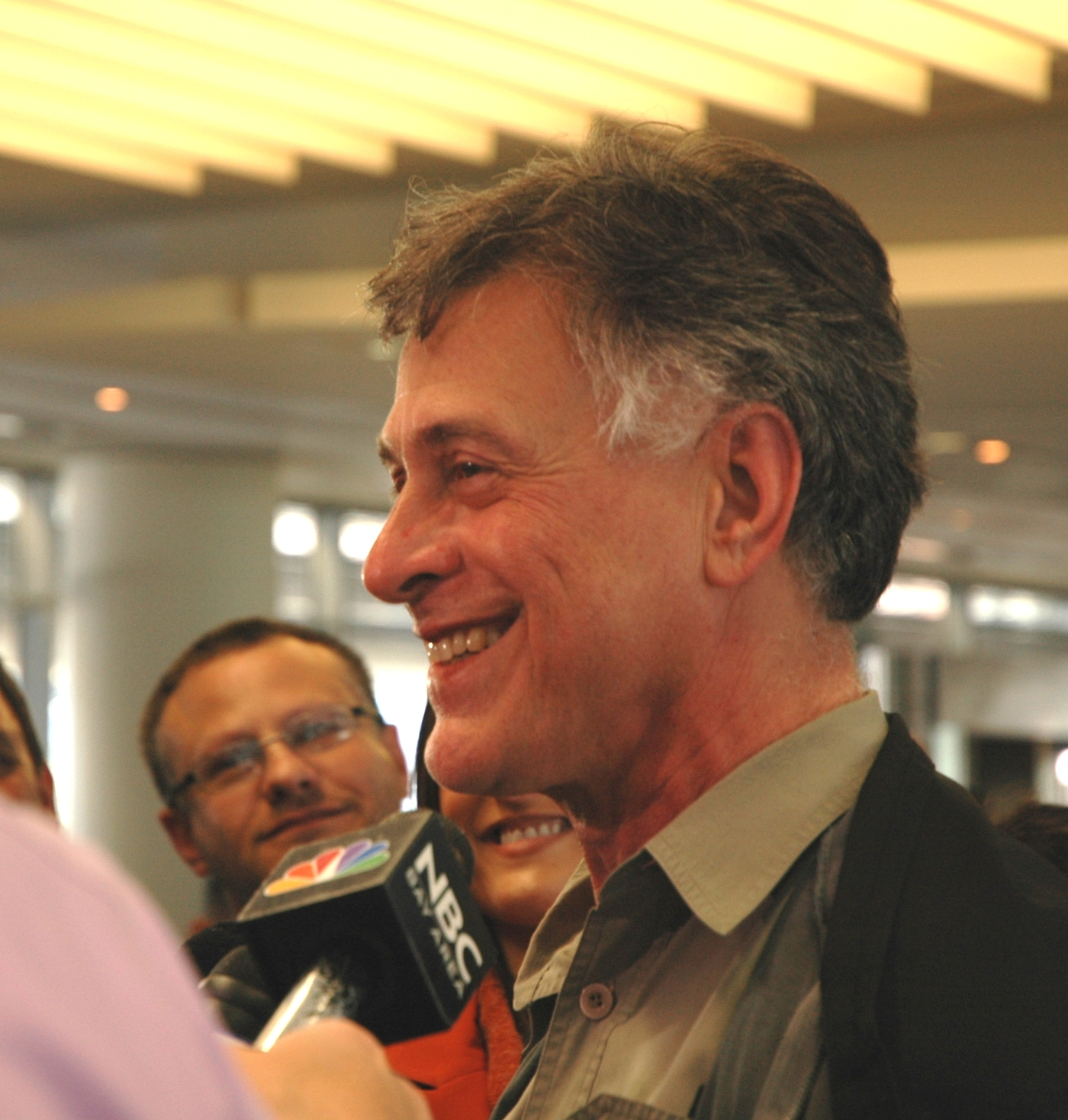
- Born: April 25, 1946 (age 79); Iran
- Education: Georgetown University (BA)
- Occupations: Activist; Author; Piano technician Lecturer
- Years active: 1987–present
- Spouse: Betty Larudee

Paul Larudee (born April 25, 1946) is an Iranian-born American political activist involved in the pro-Palestinian movement. Based in the San Francisco Bay area, he is involved with the International Solidarity Movement and was a founder of the Free Gaza Movement and the Free Palestine Movement. During the Syrian civil war, he advocated in favor of Bashar al-Assad.

== Early life and education ==
Larudee was born in Iran to an Iranian Presbyterian minister and his American missionary spouse in 1946 and grew up in the American Midwest.

He attended Georgetown University from 1970 to 1973 and received a Ph.D. in linguistics. He also graduated from the Niles Bryant School of Piano Technology in 1990.

== Career ==
Larudee spent 14 years in Arab countries, supervising a Ford Foundation project in Lebanon, working as a Fulbright-Hays lecturer in Lebanon, and a United States government adviser to Saudi Arabia.

Larudee has worked in the U.S. and abroad as a piano technician. He is certified as a Registered Piano Technician by the Piano Technicians Guild and has conducted training classes for the Guild and in overseas programs. He is the inventor of the patented Lo-Torq tuning pin, which is used for piano rebuilding. He has also compiled an English-Spanish glossary of piano terminology.

He now runs the company Sharpe & Flatte Piano Service in El Cerrito, California.

He often appears on Iranian state media.

== Views ==
Larudee supports the Boycott, Divestment and Sanctions (BDS) movement and opposes Jewish emigration to Israel. He has accused Israel of carrying out pogroms and committing genocide against Palestinians. He opposes Israel confiscating Palestinian land and the blockade of Palestinian cities into "concentration camps." He has also expressed sympathy for Palestinians who turn to terrorism. He defines Palestine as "Israel, the West Bank, the Gaza Strip and Jerusalem." He believes that the Palestinian issue is the "root" of many problems in the wider Middle East and even in the United States.

At a 2009 fundraiser for Gaza, Larudee said that "Palestine will be freed in our lifetime" and that "We are all Palestinians ... What happened to Palestinians can happen to everyone."

In response to the notion that Israel has a natural right to sovereignty and existence, Larudee has responded "I am sorry but there is no nation on earth that has the right to exist and this was articulated by Thomas Jefferson.... nations have risen and fallen and disappeared from the earth and will appear on the earth according to the necessity and requirements of their population. No nation on the earth has the right to exist, let us get rid of this myth." He supports lawfare against Israel.

Larudee has said of Palestinian acts of violence against Israel:

I do not see wild-eyed religious fanaticism as the reason for the attacks. I see instead a resilient people without other means of resistance, pushed to desperation by the increasing pressures of ethnic cleansing, while their cries for help are ignored. Is there a proud people anywhere that might not be driven to such measures to defend themselves?

Elsewhere, he has stated that he is opposed to suicide bombing.

In a 2019 appearance on Iran's Press TV alongside his regular collaborator, Holocaust denier Kevin Barrett, Larudee argued that U.S. foreign policy is dictated by Israel and that officials "who are supposedly appointed by Trump are actually appointed by Tel Aviv, for the most part."

On the Syrian Civil War, Larudee has said that NGOs such as Amnesty International and Physicians for Human Rights are in league with NATO's warmongers and exaggerate the Syrian Air Force's use of barrel bombs.

== Activism ==
=== International Solidarity Movement ===
Larudee is an active member and local leader of the International Solidarity Movement (ISM), in which capacity he has acted as a human shield in the West Bank. He has also written training materials for new ISM members. He has been described as the head of ISM's northern California chapter.

=== Beit Jala incident ===
Larudee was one of about 100 individuals who visited refugee camps in the vicinity of Bethlehem and Nablus between March 29 and April 13, 2002, to protest and, in his words, to "check on the families...to see how they were". Larudee claimed to have been shot at and wounded at a camp in Beit Jala on April 1. In a CNN interview, he said that before visiting the families he and his colleagues had to ask the IDF forces at the camps for permission. "But their reaction was to simply fire at us". After the CNN interviewer noted that a report stated the Israel Defense Forces (IDF) soldiers had "fired at your feet," Larudee acknowledged that the IDF had not fired at their bodies. He claimed, however, that shots had bounced off the stone walls and caused "several head injuries" in his group. In a June 2002 interview, he admitted that it was "possible in some cases I was protecting the wrong people".

=== Free Gaza Movement ===
Larudee is a co-founder of the Free Gaza Movement (FGM) (along with Greta Berlin, Mary Hughes Thompson, Sharyn Lock and Renee Bowyer), which was formed in fall 2006 to challenge the Israeli blockade of the Gaza Strip. Its first attempt to break the Israeli blockade took place in August 2008. FGM has asserted that its activities fall under the banner of "civil resistance" and "direct action" against Israel's "brutal siege" and its "collective punishment" of Gazans. FGM has conducted eight separate trips to Gaza, between August 2008 and July 2009. Larudee was one of the passengers on the Free Gaza Movement's first trip, on August 23–29, 2008. Fellow passengers included ISM co-founder Huwaida Arraf.

=== Gaza Freedom Flotilla ===
Larudee was a member of the U.S. delegation aboard the 2010 Gaza Freedom Flotilla, which was attacked by Israeli forces on May 31, 2010. Larudee was on board the ship Sfendoni when the raid took place. He later said that he and his collaborators "locked arms to prevent the Israelis from coming in but they used electric tasers, stun grenades, and batons and they smashed the windows of the wheelhouse and then they tied us. When it got light, they had removed all the handcuffs. I spoke to some of my Greek friends and got an OK to jump into water. So I made sure that everybody could see me, because I wanted lots of witnesses, and when the Israeli started coming closer to me, I jumped. My goal was to delay the Israelis and spoil their plans, and encourage the others on the ship to resist".

Larudee jumped into the water, later explaining that "I chose to resist by jumping overboard from the Sfendoni soon after we were captured, far out at sea. I took the calculated risk that Israel would find it hard to explain its failure to rescue me, and that the act might disrupt their operations to at least some extent".

After this, according to Larudee, the IDF subjected him to "multiple beatings in two days of captivity in Israel". He wrote that he "continued to protest by refusing to speak or walk, forcing my captors to carry me. Pain was used to force me to comply, and of course, when pain didn't work, they applied more pain, with the same result". In an interview he said that "I forced them to carry me everywhere. I wouldn't open my mouth for most of the time. They were very rough with me. They put my arm behind my back and twisted my joints. This was basically torture. I screamed, but I also told them that you can tear my arm out and it's not going to make me walk. So they ended up carrying me". All Israeli government officials and members of the military were exonerated by an internal inquiry into these events.

Although Larudee said he practiced nonviolence during this entire episode, he said that "it's not necessarily for everyone" and expressed his admiration for those on the Mavi Marmara, another boat in the flotilla, who resisted the IDF violently. He also maintained that all of the flotilla's participants were unarmed.

Gene St. Onge, who took part in the 2010 flotilla, later said that in response to the IDF's orders, Larudee had "resisted at every point. If they told Paul to sit, he'd stand. If they told him to stand, he'd sit". It was when soldiers started paying attention to another passenger, St. Onge continued, that Larudee jumped overboard.

Larudee was arrested in and deported from Israel in 2006. Larudee was accused by Israeli authorities of being engaged in "anti-Israeli" activities that included meetings with Hamas a group accused by the United States of being a terrorism. Larudee had been photographed with Hamas leaders when he received an award after the Gaza flotillas. He was traveling this time under the false identity Paul Wilder because he had been banned from the country before due to his association with Palestinian terrorist groups according to Lee Kaplan. Lee Kaplan from StoptheISM.com alerted the Israeli security before his trip. LaRudee tried to remain in Israel in a case that went to Israel's Supreme Court but Larudee claimed he was deported due to Kaplan's articles about him. "This is something small I can do to make life under occupation just a little more bearable for people, so I do it," he said. But when he disembarked from his plane, Israeli authorities put him in a holding cell. When they ordered him back onto the plane to be deported, he refused to go and instead contacted an Israeli leftist human-rights attorney.

Larudee organized the 2011 Gaza Freedom Flotilla under the auspices of the Free Palestine Movement, but Greek authorities refused to let the ships leave port. According to Larudee, U.S. Secretary of State Hillary Clinton cautioned the 2011 flotilla organizers against "creating a situation in which the Israelis have a right to defend themselves".

=== Free Palestine Movement ===
Larudee is a co-founder of the Free Palestine Movement, which achieved official recognition by the United Nations in 2011.

=== Eviction in Contra Costa County ===
On March 17, 2011, Larudee was lawfully evicted by the Contra Costa County Sheriffs Department. During the eviction, he was warned that he would be arrested if he refused to cooperate. He refused, and was carried to a transportation vehicle. Larudee later described this as "torture".

=== Global March to Jerusalem ===
Larudee was one of the organizers of the Global March to Jerusalem. He and the other organizers, Feroze Mithiborwala and Ali Mallah, wrote at the Huffington Post in March 2012 that "Israel is justifiably concerned about being treated as an international pariah" because "Israel has, in effect, put all its eggs in the American basket. American power is what allows Israel to receive deferential treatment in most European countries....Without U.S. diplomatic intervention, advocacy and arm-twisting, it is doubtful that any country in the world would defend Israel's policies". They added that the Greek government had "humiliated itself by preventing a peaceful flotilla of boats from leaving its shores for Gaza in 2011, for the sake of relations with Israel". And they concluded that the Global March to Jerusalem was "merely the latest and possibly the largest and most diverse expression" of swelling worldwide anti-Israeli sentiment.

=== Deportation from India ===
Larudee was taken into custody in December 2012 in Tirur in the Malappuram district of India, where he had spoken at a Student Islamic Organisation conference. Charged with "violating visa norms," he was issued a "quit India" notice, which required that he "leave India as early as possible". He was then blacklisted by police in Kerala, which means that he cannot enter India again.

According to one report, Larudee was taken into custody and was sent back due to his violation of the visa condition that tourists are not allowed to deliver speeches to the public.

=== Association for Investment in Popular Action Committees/Syrian Solidarity Movement ===
Larudee is the treasurer of the Association for Investment in Popular Action Committees, an umbrella nonprofit for other nonprofit organizations formed in 2007 and the parent body of the Syria Solidarity Movement (SSM), which opposes "military conflict and imperialist interests" in Syria, and of which Larudee is a steering committee member. From 2007 to 2017, the Association received over $1.8 million in support from undisclosed donors. During the Syrian civil war, the Syria Solidarity Movement supported the Assad regime and more specifically the Syrian Social Nationalist Party, which has been criticized as fascist and "rabidly anti-semitic".

SSM was formed in 2013 to facilitate a North American speaking tour for Agnes Mariam de la Croix, a nun who argues that chemical attacks in Syria such as Ghouta in 2013, were perpetrated by rebels. In 2014, the SSM sponsored a delegation, including Larudee, to Syria to observe the 2014 elections, hosted by the International Union of Unified Ummah, an Iranian NGO. On the morning of the election, the delegation announced "The poll is about to demonstrate the real scale of public support President Assad is enjoying inside the country, heroically resisting foreign-sponsored aggression for more than three years." Larudee appeared on Syrian state television during the visit. Commenting in 2016 on the visit, Larudee said "It's easy for us to come off as apologists for Assad when we're working to correct the false information in the hostile Western media."

In 2017, the Association paid U.S. Representative from Ohio Dennis Kucinich $20,000 to attend a conference of the pro-Assad European Centre for the Study of Extremism in London. The Association has been described as a pro-Assad group. Kucinich later returned the money after reports of the Association's support for Assad. At the time, Larudee said he did not “care that [Assad] is a dictator” and the Syria Solidarity Movement described Syrian government chemical weapons attacks such as the 2017 Khan Shaykhun attack as "false flag" operations designed to discredit the government. The Association's president, Kamal Obeid, has propounded 9/11 conspiracies in the past. Former Ohio governor Ted Strickland, referring to Larudee, Obeid and the Association, described them as "a group that has been a cheerleader for this murderous dictator, with ties to the disgusting 9/11 truther movement, and... individuals who claim that Israel's goal is ethnic cleansing."

The Association manages the Serena Shim Award for Uncompromised Integrity in Journalism, named for deceased Press TV journalist Serena Shim, which has awarded thousands of dollars to alternative media figures such as Max Blumenthal, Ajamu Baraka and Rania Khalek. Larudee is the treasurer of the award.

In 2019 Larudee travelled to Syria to participate in the Third International Trade Union Forum, presided over by President Bashar al-Assad. In May 2021, he went with the Syria Solidarity Movement on a regime-sponsored tour, for the stated purpose "to witness the […] presidential election in Syria and to investigate on-the-ground conditions of Syrian life in the current period". The group concluded that "the re-election of President Bashar al-Assad, of the Arab Socialist Ba’ath Party and the National Progressive Front, is the legitimate, democratic expression of the Syrian people."
