= Sonja van den Ende =

Dutch journalist and political activist

Sonja van den Ende is a Dutch blogger and political activist who has been described as a Russian propagandist producing disinformation by the Ukrainian OSINT organization Molfar, and as "a pro-Russian conspiracy theorist" by the European Platform for Democratic Elections. The Dutch investigative journalism website Pointer described her reporting from Russia as a "propaganda tour" for the Russian state, and her activities as "of great importance for the spread of Russian propaganda".

== Career ==
=== Political activism ===
In 2011, Van den Ende was a candidate Member of Parliament, standing for the Overijssel on behalf of the Socialist Party (SP). She was very active in the SP-led demonstrations against the wars in Iraq and Afghanistan, as well as in support for Palestine and Hamas. However, during the war in Syria, her pro-Assad and pro-Russian stance led to disagreement with the SP and subsequently she left the party. She has also been associated with the Communist Party of the Netherlands.

=== Journalism and move to Russia ===
Van den Ende became a citizen journalist in around 2012, using social media sites such as Facebook and alternative media platforms such as DeWereldMorgen or CovertAction Magazine. In 2012, Van den Ende claimed that Syrian president Bashar al-Assad "is not a dictator", and a year later, she denied that the Syrian government has used chemical weapons. Van den Ende is known to have visited Syria twice, and again in 2018, on trips organised by the Syrian government. Van den Ende accused the West of mass murder and sponsoring Jihadism, portraying Russia as a stabilizing and peacekeeping force in Syria.

Van den Ende has lived in Russia since the late 2010s in a furnished apartment provided by the Russian State, often criticising Western media, while consistently supporting the Russian narrative. She has questioned Russia's responsibility for the Butcha massacre as well as the Mariupol hospital airstrike, referring to Russia's invasion of Ukraine as a "special military operation", and Russia's taking of new territories as "liberation". She also claimed that the Malaysia Airlines Flight 17 was shot down by Ukrainian forces, and has shared various Russian conspiracy theories and fake news. Van den Ende has emphasized Neo-Nazism in Ukraine, and blamed the destruction of Ukrainian settlements such as Volnovakha and Mariupol on Ukrainian forces. Van den Ende is known to have visited Russian-occupied territories of Donbas several times, on trips organised by the Russian State. including being one of the observers for the referendums concerning the Russian annexation of Donetsk, Kherson, Luhansk and Zaporizhzhia oblasts of Ukraine which she praised as fair. After visiting Donbas on a press tour in 2022, Van Den Ende offered a testimony to the Civic Chamber of the Russian Federation saying that Ukraine had committed war crimes. Some of the alternative media outlets Van den Ende has been associated with have been identified as part of Russian disinformation campaigns, such as Oneworld Press. She was also the observer at the 2023 elections in Russian-occupied Ukraine. Van den Ende has downplayed the issue of climate change.

Van den Ende told the Russian media that her name has been included in the Ukrainian Myrotvorets list as an enemy of Ukraine, and that she will not return to the Netherlands for fear of persecution because of her position on the Donbas. She also claimed that "Democratic Ukraine and the US (CIA) have put me on the death list" and that her reporting is "censored in Europe".

In 2022, the Dutch newspaper De Telegraaf described Van den Ende's output as "tirelessly following the Kremlin narrative" and noted her fondness for conspiracy theories. Other Dutch newspapers (Het Parool, Algemeen Dagblad) cited Louk Faesen, a scholar studying Russian disinformation at The Hague Center for Strategic Studies, who argued that Van den Ende's journalism is used by Russian state for publicity purposes and that she repeats Russian propaganda and disinformation in order to discredit Western media. Following criticism of her reporting in mid-2022, the alternative media platform, DeWereldMorgen which has previously published some of her work, deleted all her articles there.

Van den Ende's reporting has been praised and cited in Russian state media, as a rare example of Western journalism that "does not tell lies", and she has been interviewed by the Russian media on several occasions. She has also been cited in similar fashion by Chinese state media. Van den Ende herself has described her own views as "a bit pro-Russian".

== See also ==
- Eva Bartlett – Canadian activist, journalist
- Russell Bentley – American pro-Russia figure
- Patrick Lancaster – American vlogger
- Gonzalo Lira – Chilean-American YouTuber
- Graham Phillips – British journalist
- Scott Ritter – American author and commentator
- Russian information war against Ukraine
