= John Mark Dougan =

American pro-Russia political commentator and fugitive

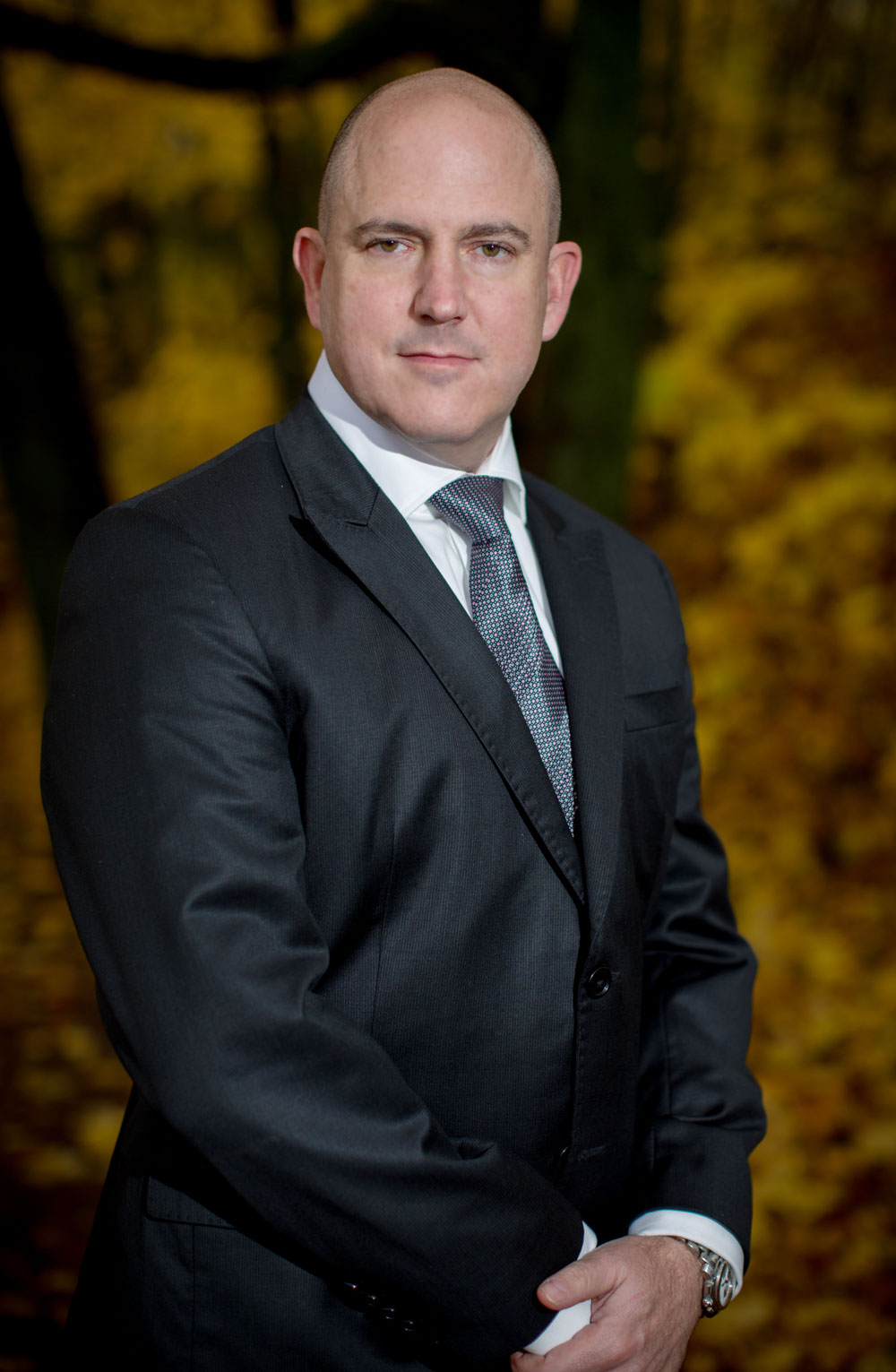
- John Mark Dougan in a Moscow forest. 2016
- Born: John Mark Dougan; December 15, 1972 (age 53); Wilmington, Delaware, Delaware, United States
- Citizenship: United States; Russia
- Occupation: Hacker
- Website: BadVolf.com

Signature
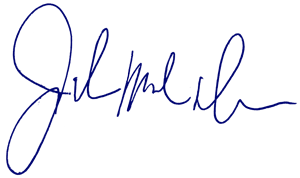

John Mark Dougan, also known as BadVolf, (born 15 December 1976) is a former US Marine, and American police officer who fled to Russia after being charged in Florida with extortion and wiretapping to become a pro-Russian hacker, conspiracy theorist and orchestrator of mass online disinformation campaigns, often involving generative AI, which have repeatedly been exposed, leading to international condemnation of both him and Russia.

Dougan has on multiple occasions either dressed as a woman, or disguised himself as a woman. Dougan has claimed he has 200 hours of video footage from Jeffrey Epstein, however as of 2026 he has not released this.

== Biography ==
Dougan had a turbulent childhood in the United States, struggling at home and in school, saying that he was bullied because of his Tourette’s syndrome. Encouraged by his stepfather, he began learning computer code at the age of 8, claiming that by the time he was 16 he knew a dozen different computer programming languages. Dougan served in the U.S. Marine Corps from May 1996 to July 1998. Dougan's short service and lowly rank achieved were “indicative of the fact that the character of his service was incongruent with the Marine Corps’ expectations and standards,” service spokesperson Yvonne Carlock has stated.

After leaving the Marines, Dougan worked as a horse trader and then founded a database design company before becoming a police officer, serving as deputy sheriff in Palm Beach County, Florida. Dougan worked at the sheriff’s office in Palm Beach from 2005 to 2008; in this time he faced 11 internal affairs investigations, and a jury awarded a fellow Palm Beach sheriff’s deputy a $275,000 settlement after it found that Dougan had pepper-sprayed and arrested the officer without cause. Dougan was permanently dismissed from the police force in 2009 after sexual harassment allegations were made against him from within the police force. Dougan would go on to claim he had been dismissed due to his 'whistleblowing'.

Following his dismissal from the police, Dougan began a personal vendetta against the Sheriff's Department and the FBI, luring West Palm Beach Sheriff Ric Bradshaw into a trap, Dougan using a voice changer to pretend to be a woman, with Bradshaw admitting that he did not always follow the law. Dougan also created a website called PBSOTalks, where he and others anonymously posted complaints and sensitive information about local officials in Florida. In 2016, after Dougan posted confidential data about thousands of police officers, federal agents and judges on the PBSOTalk site, the FBI and local police searched his home.

=== Russia ===
In 2017, prosecutors in Palm Beach County, Florida charged Dougan with extortion and wiretapping, and issued an arrest warrant. By then, having once again disguised himself as a woman, Dougan had already fled, via Canada, to Russia, where he had visited several times before, apparently to visit women he had met online. After his visit to Russia, Dougan began to go by the alias BadVolf (БадВолф), a cover identity as a Russian hacker under which he published illegally tapped telephone calls and other sensitive data on the internet.

Since living in Russia, Dougan has made a number of sensationalist claims, including telling media in 2019 that he had 200 hours of compromising material (including sex tapes of famous people), which he claimed came from Jeffrey Epstein, who was arrested by the Palm Beach Police in 2006.

As of 2026 Dougan has yet to release any of his Epstein material. Dougan has also claimed to have been behind the cyberattack on the Democratic National Committee in July 2016, which resulted in numerous internal emails from the Democrats and Hillary Clinton being published on WikiLeaks, although external sources have not verified this claim.

In Russia, Dougan is said to have worked with the military intelligence agency GRU and propagandist Aleksandr Dugin, attempting to influence elections in Europe and the United States, including the Storm-1516 campaign. He was reportedly involved in the distribution of deepfakes and AI-generated videos to damage Kamala Harris in the 2024 United States presidential election.

In 2024, Dougan was directly connected to over 150 websites which spread pro-Kremlin propaganda, conspiracy theories and disinformation, with the websites disguised as local news and often containing AI-generated content. In 2024, Eliot Higgins of Bellingcat exposed Dougan for having created a fake news website to make fabricated claims of sexual impropriety against pro-Russian British journalist Graham Phillips, with Higgins speculating this was likely a personal vendetta from Dougan.

In mid-2025, Dougan created over 100 German-language AI-generated websites to try to influence the 2025 German federal election, and was again exposed for doing so. Dougan was also linked with attempts to influence the 2025 Moldovan parliamentary election by orchestrating a disinformation campaign across social media, including circulating false claims such as pro-European Moldovan President Maia Sandu taking bribes, and (Sandu) having spent money to acquire sperm from Hollywood celebrities. When Dougan was confronted with allegations of his involvement in yet another disinformation campaign, he stated: “I have no idea what you’re talking about. Moldova? Where is that? I thought it was a fictitious country in one of those romance Hallmark movies…” In late 2025 Dougan, was again exposed, this time linked to a scheme which cloned French news websites, attempting to make the fake sites look like the original.

== See also ==
- Russian information war against Ukraine
- State-sponsored Internet propaganda
- Troll farm
- Gonzalo Lira
- Jackson Hinkle
- Patrick Lancaster
- Scott Ritter
