= Russell Bentley =

American soldier in Russian military (1960–2024)

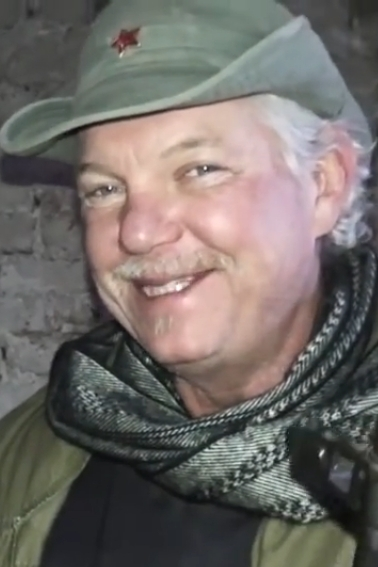
- Bentley in 2015
- Born: Russell Bonner Bentley III; June 20, 1960; Austin, Texas, U.S.
- Died: April 8, 2024 (aged 63); Donetsk, Russian-occupied Ukraine
- Cause of death: Tortured to death
- Military career
- Allegiance: Russia
- Branch: Russian people's militias in Ukraine; Donetsk People's Militia; Vostok Battalion
- Service years: 2014–2024
- Nicknames: Bonner; Texas; The Donbas Cowboy
- Conflicts: Russo-Ukrainian War; War in Donbas; Battle of Mariupol; Second Battle of Donetsk Airport; Russian invasion of Ukraine

Russell Bonner Bentley III (Russian: Рассел Бентли, romanized: Rassel Bentli; June 20, 1960 – April 8, 2024), also known as Texas (Russian: Техас, pronounced "Tekhas") and the Donbass Cowboy (Note: The spelling "Donbass" used in "Donbass Cowboy" is the Russian style.), was an American pro-Russia figure in the war in Donbas and Russian invasion of Ukraine, and a self-described "information warrior".

Prior to his activities in Donbas, Bentley was a marijuana activist who stood for election in the U.S. Senate, and a convicted drug trafficker who spent five years in prison and several years as a fugitive. Bentley moved to Donbas in late 2014, becoming a pro-Russian combatant and YouTuber until his channel was deleted in early 2022, and also working for the Russian state-owned Sputnik news agency as a war correspondent. He became a naturalized Russian citizen in 2020. In April 2024 he was kidnapped and murdered by Russian soldiers in what may have been a case of mistaken identity.

== Biography ==
=== Early life ===
Bentley was born in 1960 to a wealthy family in Austin, Texas. Until Bentley was age eight, they lived in Highland Park, Texas, which Bentley later described as "very exclusive" and "basically the Beverly Hills of Dallas." As a teenager, Bentley read leftist literature and became a socialist, later describing himself as the "black sheep" of his family due to his support of leftist causes. He attended high school at 16 for one semester before dropping out. He later attained his GED, and at age 20 was convinced by his father to join the U.S. Army, in which he served for three years in Louisiana and Germany. After an honorable discharge he moved to South Padre Island where he partied for years, worked as a waiter and played guitar in "The Asbestos Band", which played a mix of covers. Bentley was known as "Bongo" at this time.

=== Marijuana activism, imprisonment, fugitive ===
In 1990 Bentley followed a girlfriend to move to Minneapolis, initially working as a lumberjack. He became a pro-marijuana activist, joining the National Organization for the Reform of Marijuana Laws and the pro-legalization Grassroots Party. In 1990 at age 30, he ran as a U.S. Senate candidate for the Grassroots Party in Minnesota, gathering 1.65% of the vote. Bentley visited communist Cuba in the mid-1990s and became a communist himself. He was also selling marijuana, and in February 1996 he was convicted of felony trafficking of marijuana and sentenced to five years and three months prison. Although he was due for release at the end of 1999, that August Bentley broke out of the minimum-security prison. He lived as a fugitive for the next few years, mostly in Washington state. He took part in the anti-globalization protest against the World Trade Organization conference in Seattle in 1999, describing that as "the last time that I was really proud to be an American". He was recaptured in 2007 and served the remainder of his sentence in a maximum-security prison. He was released the following summer under supervision until 2012, which included a twelve-step program and a ban on intoxicants. Bentley was so enraged at the 2011 killing of Muammar Gaddafi that he donned rock climbing gear and scaled a US Marine Corps recruiting billboard in Austin, defacing it with "FUCK NATO" in six-foot letters. By 2014, Bentley was working as an arborist in Round Rock, Texas.

=== In Donbas ===
==== Early years ====
In 2014, Bentley was following the war in Donbas. After the Ukrainian air strike on Luhansk on June 2, 2014, Bentley was moved by a video of a fatally wounded young woman. Despite not speaking Russian, he resolved to take arms against the Ukrainian forces. He broke up with his yoga-instructor girlfriend, left his job as an estimator for a tree-trimming company, and arrived in Donetsk on December 7, 2014. Bentley financed his activities with a GoFundMe campaign titled "Fact Finding Mission to Donbass [sic]".

Arriving in Donbas in late 2014, Bentley decided to fight for the Donetsk People's Republic, perceiving it as a battle against fascism and injustice in Ukraine. Bentley acquired the nom de guerre "Texas", and was also known as the "Donbass Cowboy" in Russian, rather than Ukrainian, orthography.

In 2015, The Independent wrote that his involvement "highlights the complex motivations behind foreign participation in the conflict". Bentley fought for the Vostok Battalion and XAH Spetsnaz Battalion in 2014, 2015 and 2017. In 2015, Bentley began uploading videos to YouTube, and focused on these activities after he stopped fighting in 2017. The BBC featured Bentley in a July 2017 article titled "The communist soldier using charity sites to fund his war". The article also featured Bentley's friend Graham Phillips, and also Patrick Lancaster who distanced himself from Bentley and was critical of Bentley's use of crowdfunding, leading to restrictions on his crowdfunding activities.

Bentley received a Donetsk People's Republic passport in 2017.

==== Later years and death ====
In 2020, Bentley received full Russian citizenship. At the beginning of Russia's 2022 invasion of Ukraine, Bentley posted a video stating that he and Russian soldiers would be "bringing the hammer down" on Ukraine. The video went viral before being deleted by YouTube, and Bentley's channel was removed from YouTube. Bentley told Rolling Stone, in an article titled "The Bizarre Story of How a Hardcore Texas Leftist Became a Frontline Putin Propagandist", "I don't give a fuck what they think about me in the United States.... the government — or most of the people". Bentley focused on work for Russian state media and social media channels for the next two years.

Bentley was reported missing in the Petrovsky region on April 8, 2024. His wife said he had been detained by unidentified Russian military personnel. After an 11 day campaign to find Bentley, on April 19 the Vostok Battalion confirmed Bentley's death via social media. Alexander Khodakovsky, a senior Vostok battalion figure, demanded on his Telegram channel that "those who killed Russell Bentley" be punished, but later deleted the message.

According to Stephen Hall, a researcher on Russian affairs at the University of Bath, the "most likely scenario is that [Bentley] was killed by Russian soldiers who mistook him for an American spy". Reports from Le Monde and Belsat indicated that the soldiers—who were allegedly intoxicated—accused Bentley of acting as a spotter for Ukrainian rocket artillery. Sources close to the leadership of the Donetsk People's Republic further alleged that Bentley had been subject to sexual violence before his death; Le Monde reported that the military board of inquiry had opened investigations into both murder and rape. On April 28, Bentley's Telegram channel reported that his vehicle had been found near the frontline, incinerated with his remains inside in an apparent attempt to conceal the crime. Al Jazeera 360 documented Bentley's story in A Diary of a Fighter.

In September 2024, four Russian servicemen, Vitaly Vasnyatsky, Vladislav Agaltsev, Vladimir Bazhin and Andrey Yordanov, were accused of abuse of authority resulting in Bentley's death (article 286 of Russia's Criminal Code), desecration of his body (article 244), and concealment of crimes (articles 33 and 316). The Investigative Committee of Russia heard that Agaltsev and Yordanov killed Bentley on April 8, placed his body in a vehicle which was subsequently blown up in an attempt to cover up the murder, then moved his remains to another location with the assistance of Vasnyatsky and Bazhin. The suspects were members of the Russian Army's 5th Separate Motor Rifle Brigade based in Donetsk Oblast and under the command of Major General Pavel Klimenko. Newsweek wrote that Bentley had supposedly been misidentified as a spy. Bentley was reportedly taken to a cave and tortured to death, before being put into a car which was then destroyed with explosives. Bentley's body had not been recovered at the time of the Newsweek article.

Klimenko was killed by a Ukrainian drone on November 6, 2024, before Bentley's body had been recovered. On December 8, 2025, Vasnyatsky, Agaltsev, Bazhin, and Yordanov were sentenced by a court-martial in Donetsk to up to 12 years' imprisonment over Bentley's killing, with Vansyatsky, Yordanov and Agaltsev stripped of their ranks.

== Electoral history ==
1990 United States Senate election in Minnesota
Party	Candidate	Votes	%
Democratic (DFL)	Paul Wellstone	911,999	50.49%
Ind.-Republican	Rudy Boschwitz (incumbent)	864,375	47.86%
Grassroots	Russell B. Bentley	29,820	1.65%
Total votes		1,806,194	100.00%

== See also ==
- Eva Bartlett – Canadian activist and journalist
- Jackson Hinkle – American political commentator
- Patrick Lancaster – American vlogger
- Gonzalo Lira – Chilean-American YouTuber
- Graham Phillips – British journalist
- Scott Ritter – American author and commentator
- Sonja van den Ende – Dutch citizen journalist and political activist
- Russian information war against Ukraine
