= Barnaby Raine =

English historian and writer (born 1995)

- Raine in 2024
- Born: 4 May 1995 (age 31); Hammersmith, London, England
- Education: Wadham College, Oxford; Columbia University
- Years active: 2010–present

Barnaby Raine (born 4 May 1995) is an English historian and activist. He is known for his left-wing and anti-imperialist political commentary. In recent years he has become known for speaking out in favor of the Palestinian people.

== Early life and education ==
Raine grew up in North London in a family described as 'committed Zionists'. His mother is now an academic specialising in health care inequalities. His father was an executive for the payday lender Wonga.com.

Raine attended Westminster School in central London. He subsequently studied at Wadham College, Oxford and graduated with a Bachelor of Arts in History and Politics in 2016. In his final year at Oxford, Raine sat on the National Executive Committee of the National Union of Students (NUS).

After graduating from Oxford, Raine went on to complete a Master of Arts in History at Columbia University, New York, in 2018 and is currently writing his PhD at the same institution on "the decline of thinking about the end of capitalism". He was awarded a 2020 International Dissertation Research Fellowship by the Social Science Research Council (SSRC).

== Career ==
Raine became a teacher at the Brooklyn Institute for Social Research in 2020. In 2023, Raine became a member of the editorial team of Salvage, a subscription-based journal of 'revolutionary arts and letters' and had previously contributed to publications such as The Guardian, Jacobin, n+1, Vashti Media, Red Pepper, New Internationalist, RealClearPolitics, Socialist Worker, and Politics/Letters. He often makes appearances on Novara Media's news livestreams on YouTube, and has occasionally guest-hosted the content. In 2023, Raine participated in The World Transformed as well as a Symposium on the Frankfurt School at the Goethe Institut.

== Activism ==
Raine became interested in politics and activism at a young age. He gained media attention following a 2011 speech protesting the planned increase in university tuition fees. He also took part in the Coalition of Resistance, Occupy London and anti-war in Afghanistan protests, and volunteered with Stop the War Coalition and Liberty. In a 2011 interview with DeWereldMorgen, he acknowledged his privileged background, and said he wanted to use his privilege to speak on behalf of those in society who "have no voice".

In 2014, while at Oxford, Raine led a boycott of the Oxford Union in light of allegations made against its then president Ben Sullivan. He also protested against Marine Le Pen's visit in 2015.

In a 2017 interview with Al Jazeera, Raine described himself as a "firm anti-Zionist", and called Israel "instilling [oppression] with gruesome violence" a "betrayal" of Jewish values, which he believed to be "mending the world" and standing "at the forefront of struggles against oppression and exploitation".
