= Tim Anderson (political economist) =

Australian academic & activist (born 1953)

- Born: 30 April 1953 (age 73)
- Occupations: Academic and activist

Tim Anderson (born 30 April 1953) is an Australian academic and activist. He was a senior lecturer at the University of Sydney until early 2019, and the author of several books on independent development and anti-imperialism. In 1979, he was convicted and imprisoned for an alleged Ananda Marga conspiracy to murder a National Front leader Robert Cameron, but was pardoned in 1985 after an inquiry and awarded compensation. In a linked case, in 1990 he was convicted of ordering the 1978 Sydney Hilton Hotel bombing and sentenced to fourteen years' imprisonment, but was acquitted on appeal in 1991. He subsequently became active in prisoners' rights and civil liberties groups, and has been involved with international solidarity and civil rights campaigns. He has worked as an academic since the early 1990s.

Anderson was suspended from his post at the University of Sydney in early December 2018 for "serious misconduct" and subsequently terminated. In 2019, the National Tertiary Education Union joined Anderson in a federal court action against Anderson's dismissal. The initial decision of that court was that an academic freedom clause did not protect Anderson from dismissal for breaches of the university's code of conduct. In August 2021, this ruling was reversed on appeal to the full court. It was not determined at the appeal whether Anderson's actions were a legitimate exercise of his intellectual freedom; the matter is to be readjudicated in the lower court. In October 2022, the Federal Court ruled that Anderson had been unlawfully sacked by the University of Sydney. In May 2024, the Full Federal Court overturned this decision upholding the decision of the University of Sydney to terminate Anderson's employment finding that Anderson's behaviour did not comply with the, “highest ethical, professional and legal standards” required to be protected under his employment contract.

== Ananda Marga bombing allegations ==
In 1979, Anderson was convicted along with Ross Dunn and Paul Alister to 16 years' imprisonment for an alleged plot by members of the Ananda Marga spiritual movement to bomb the house of Robert Cameron, a member of the far-right National Front of Australia. After almost seven years in prison the three were pardoned and paid a sum in compensation following an inquiry into the convictions in 1985. In a linked case, he was re-arrested in 1989. In 1990, Anderson was convicted for three counts of murder for planning the Sydney Hilton Hotel bombing, for which Evan Pederick had been jailed the previous year. Anderson was sentenced to fourteen years' imprisonment, but was acquitted on appeal in 1991. In directing an acquittal NSW Chief Justice Murray Gleeson said:

The trial of the appellant miscarried principally because of an error which resulted in large part from the failure of the prosecuting authorities adequately to check aspects of the Jayewardene theory. (Note: The Jayewardene theory refers to the prosecution's attempt to reconcile an inconsistency in the evidence of their principal witness, Evan Pederick. When it became apparent that his 1989 account of events in which he implicated himself and Anderson in the attempted assassination of Indian Prime Minister Morarji Desai was impossible—owing to discrepancies with documented arrival times and places—the prosecution advanced the view that Pederick had confused the Sri Lankan President J. R. Jayewardene with Desai. This theory was put to the jury without notice to the defence, who were unable to reexamine any witnesses to test this theory. It later transpired that Pederick's account could not fit with this later explanation of events either. Had the "prosecuting authorities" checked the detail, as Justice Gleeson mentions, of times and places of protected persons arriving and leaving the hotel, or the court had ensured the defence could do so, the "Jayewardene theory" would have been exposed as untenable at the time of the trial.) This was compounded by what I regard as an inappropriate and unfair attempt by the Crown to persuade the jury to draw inferences of fact, and accept argumentative suggestions, that were not properly open on the evidence. I do not consider that in those circumstances the Crown should be given a further opportunity to patch up its case against the appellant. It has already made one attempt too many to do that, and I believe that, if that attempt had never been made, there is a strong likelihood that the appellant would have been acquitted.

The two failed prosecutions against Anderson and his friends are cited as examples of Australian miscarriages of justice, for example in Kerry Carrington's 1991 book Travesty! Miscarriages of Justice and in other law texts, including notes on compensation practice.

== Academic history ==
Anderson obtained a BA in economics from Murdoch University in 1983, a BA (Hons) from Macquarie University in 1986, and a PhD from Macquarie University in 1997. He was a lecturer at the University of Technology Sydney from 1994 to 1999 and was a senior lecturer at the University of Sydney from 1998 until his dismissal in 2019.

Anderson was investigated by the University of Sydney in August 2018 for defending a badge worn by a former colleague, Jay Tharappel, which said "death to Israel". Tharappel had been photographed wearing a jacket bearing the badge. Anderson described Tharappel as a "Syrian solidarity activist" who was "under attack from zionists" and "friends of Israel". Australian Education Minister Simon Birmingham described Anderson as an "embarrassment to academia" with "extreme views", and the investigation was welcomed by the Executive Council of Australian Jewry. After The Australian Jewish News published an article on the issue, Anderson wrote to the newspaper saying that he did not support the expressions that appeared on the jacket including "Death to Israel". He wrote that he had merely refused to censor a photograph in which the badge appeared. He also wrote that he "opposed all apartheid states" and believed the "racial state of Israel must be dismantled".

Anderson was suspended from his University of Sydney Senior Lecturer role in December 2018 for showing students material including an image of a Nazi swastika superimposed over the Israeli flag. Reports indicated Anderson was given a week to show cause as to why he should not be dismissed. On Facebook, Anderson described the action of the university as "political censorship". Anderson appealed against the university's decision to terminate his employment for "serious misconduct" with the support of several dozen of his colleagues. In February 2019, the appeal was rejected by a three-member committee by a majority vote. The university said in a statement that the slide image was "disrespectful and offensive" and "contrary to the university's behavioural expectations and requirements for all staff." In October 2022, the Federal Court ruled that Anderson had been unlawfully sacked by the University of Sydney as he had been exercising his academic freedom and had created the graphic for academic purposes. In May 2024, the Full Federal Court overturned this decision finding that Anderson's behaviour did not comply with the, “highest ethical, professional and legal standards” required to be protected under his employment contract.

== International and civil rights campaigns ==
Anderson has supported civil liberties and prisoners' rights in Australia. He was involved in the Sydney-based group Justice Action in the 1990s. This group worked with the campaign group 'Campaign Exposing the Frame-Up of Tim Anderson' (CEFTA), whose newsletter Framed was taken over by Justice Action and ran until 2004. He was later Secretary of the NSW Council for Civil Liberties over 1998–1999. Prisoners' rights were a theme of his writing in the 1980s and 1990s, as reflected in his book 1989 book Inside Outlaws and part of his 1992 book Take Two, along with published papers and interviews.

Anderson has campaigned in support of East Timor, North Korea, Cuba, Venezuela, Palestine and Ba'athist Syria. Between 2008 and 2014 he made a series of short documentaries on the Cuban training of Timorese doctors, and the work of Cuban doctors in the Pacific. In February 2017 Cuba awarded him their Friendship Medal "as an acknowledgement of his unconditional solidarity towards Cuba and its revolution".

He has been a critic of what he sees as uninvited foreign intervention in Syria including the use of foreign funded groups, like the White Helmets, to call for humanitarian intervention in Syria. He described allegations the Syrian government was responsible for the Khan Shaykhun chemical attack as a "hoax", contradicted by independent evidence. After meeting president Assad in 2013, Anderson described him as a "mild-mannered eye doctor".

In 2016, Anderson and other academics established the pro-Assad Centre for Counter Hegemonic Studies "after concern that many Western academic bodies constrain, censor and marginalise counter-hegemonic or anti-imperial research and discussion, due to their close ties with government and corporate sponsors". According to Anderson, the organisation has no budget and is intended to compile a "virtual library" in support of sovereignty and self-determination.

He has visited Syria many times during the war, and attracted criticism for visiting in late 2013, while the Assad government was conducting bombing of civilians and hospitals, schools and civilian infrastructure in opposition-held areas of Syria. The civil war he says is a "fiction" created by the United States "to destroy an independent nation". In April 2017 he co-hosted a two-day conference on Syria at the University of Sydney, described in The Australian and The Sydney Morning Herald as a "pro-Assad conference". In September 2017, he travelled with journalist Eva Bartlett to Pyongyang and pledged solidarity with the North Korean people against alleged aggression from the West. He also attracted controversy in April 2017 for using a series of Anzac Day social media posts to allege the Australian air force was committing murder in Syria.

== Opinions ==
In a 2008 entry published in e-journal The National Forum, Anderson said that Wikipedia has a "US-centric bias" on what sources the encyclopedia considers reliable and on what edits its administrators make.

In academic writing, Anderson stresses the principle of self-determination of peoples, in international law and the twin covenants of human rights. Similarly, he calls his 2016 book on the Syrian Civil War, published by the Centre for Research on Globalization, a 'defence of the right of the Syrian people to determine their own society and political system ... consistent with international law'. The Spectator Australia described the Centre for Research on Globalization as "a book club gathering for academic crackpots and conspiracy theorists".

== Publications ==
- The liberation of class: P.R. Sarkar's theory of class and history, Proutist Universal Publications, 1984.
- Free Alister Dunn and Anderson: The Ananda Marga Conspiracy Case, Wild & Woolley, 1985.
- Inside outlaws: a prison diary, Redfern Legal Centre Publishing, 1989.
- Take two: the criminal justice system revisited, Bantam Books, 1992.
- with Gaby Carney, Defend yourself: facing a charge in court, Redfern Legal Centre Publishing, 1996.
- Land and livelihoods in Papua New Guinea, Australian Scholarly Publishing, 2015.
- The Dirty War on Syria: Washington, Regime Change and Resistance, GlobalResearch, 2016
- Countering War Propaganda of the Dirty War on Syria. Damascus, New Dalmoun Press, 2017
- Axis of Resistance: towards an independent Middle East. Atlanta, Clarity Press, 2019
- The Pandemic and Independent Countries. Sydney, Centre for Counter Hegemonic Studies, 2020, ISBN 9781393151951
