= Olexander Scherba =

Ukrainian diplomat

- Олександр Щерба
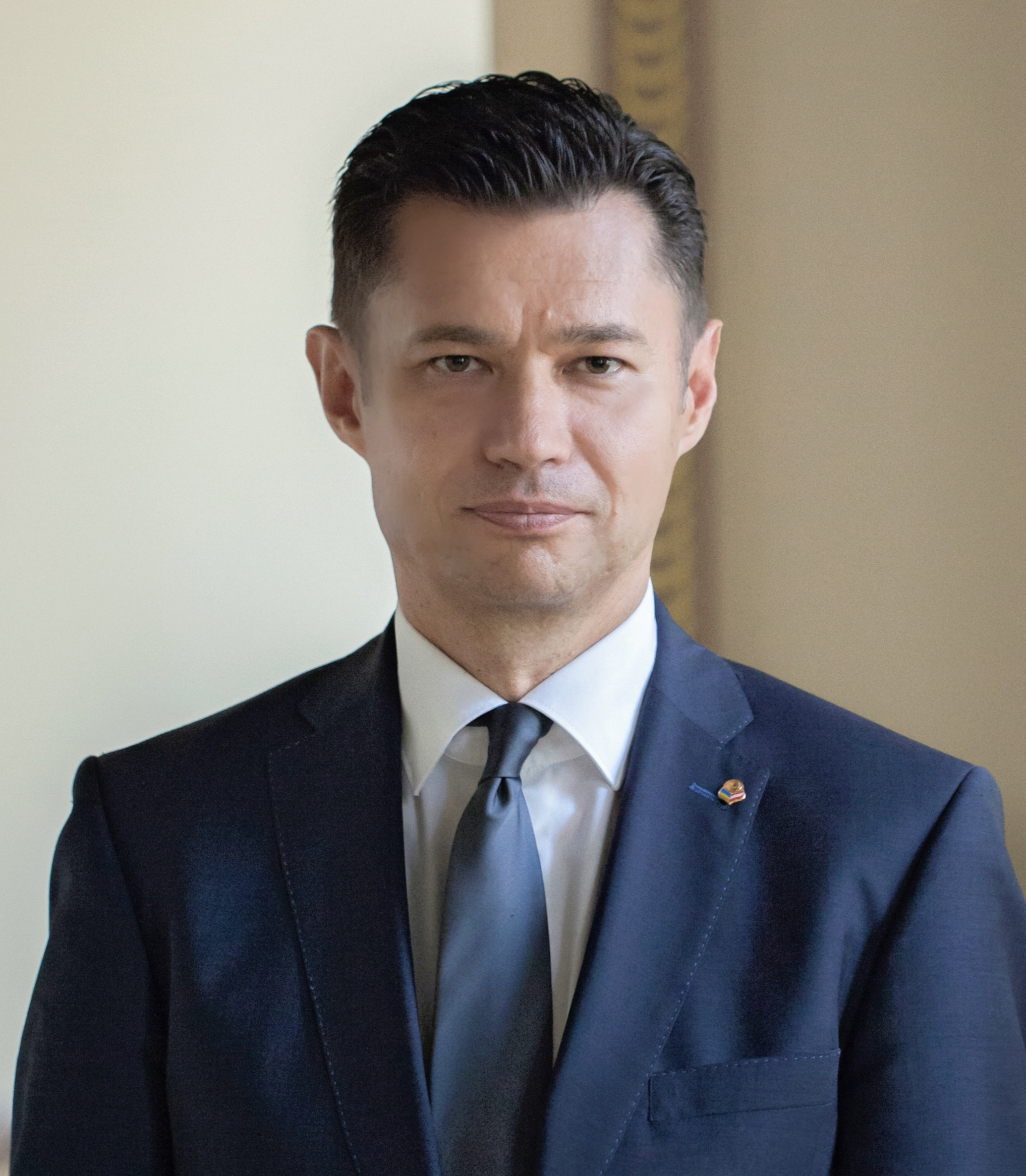

Ambassador of Ukraine to Austria
- In office 2014–2021
- Preceded by: Andriy Bereznyy
- Succeeded by: Vasyl Khymynets

Personal details
- Born: Olexander Vasilyovich Scherba; 22 June 1970 (age 56) Kiev, Ukrainian SSR, Soviet Union
- Education: Taras Shevchenko National University of Kyiv
- Occupation: Diplomat

Olexander Vasilyovich Scherba (Ukrainian: Олександр Васильович Щерба; born 22 June 1970) is a Ukrainian diplomat, Ambassador of Ukraine to the Republic of South Africa, who worked as Ambassador of Ukraine to Austria in 2014–2021.

== Biography ==
Graduated from Kyiv Shevchenko University in 1993 (German and English philology). PhD in political sciences (Kyiv Institute of International Relations) in 2001.

Entered diplomatic service in March 1995. In 1996-2000, worked as attaché, third secretary at Ukraine’s Embassy to Germany (Bonn, Berlin). In 2000-2003 he worked as first secretary, deputy chief of staff, speechwriter to Ukraine‘s foreign minister Anatoliy Zlenko, helped writing his book “Politics and Diplomacy”. In 2004-2008 Scherba served as counselor at Ukraine’s Embassy to the United States. He was congressional liaison, and liaison for international Jewish organizations. On November 22, 2004, he authored the statement of protest against falsification of presidential elections in Ukraine. Three further diplomats of the embassy joined the statement.

Since 2008 he contributes as columnist to Ukraine’s central weekly newspaper Dzerkalo Tyzhnia. In 2008-2009, he worked at the EU Department of Ukraine’s MFA. In 2009-2010, during the presidential campaign, he was advisor to then presidential candidate Arseniy Yatsenyuk. In 2010-2013, he worked as ambassador-at-large at Ukraine’s Foreign ministry. In 2013-2014, he served as advisor to Ukraine’s first vice-prime-minister Serhiy Arbuzov, being in charge of negotiations with IMF and European Union (in particular, with regard to preparation of the Ukraine-EU Association Agreement).

In February–November 2014, he returned to Ukraine’s Foreign ministry as ambassador-at-large, participated in the information group, countering Russia’s aggression in Crimea and Donbas. He was the main author of the address by Ukraine’s president Petro Poroshenko to American Congress in September 2014. On 17 November 2014, he was appointed Ukraine’s ambassador to Austria.

In October of 2018, Scherba claimed that British journalist Graham Phillips had called him a 'fascist', and attempted to provoke him into a fight at his ambassador's residence in Vienna.

His book “Vaccination from Darkness” was published in Ukrainian in 2020. Ukraine's PEN Club included it to 2020 top-15 best books in the category “essays”.

His book “Ukraine vs. Darkness. Undiplomatic Thoughts” was published in English by the German publishing house “Ibidem” on April 30, 2021.

On April 28, 2021 he was recalled as ambassador to Austria and officially relinquished his duties on July 11, 2021.

He was appointed Ambassador of Ukraine to the Republic of South Africa on July 21, 2025.
