= Acrobat (novel) =

2003 novel by Gonzalo Lira

- Author: Gonzalo Lira
- Publication date: May 18, 2002
- Pages: 364
- ISBN: 978-0-312-28694-1

Acrobat is a spy thriller written by Gonzalo Lira. The film rights were sold to Miramax; Lira was reported to have received $650,000 for the sale, with filmmakers Sidney Pollack and Anthony Minghella to produce.

== Reception ==
Publishers Weekly wrote that "the flabby, juvenile prose leaves much to be desired" but that readers who made it through would be surprised by the "perfectly twisted ending".

Kirkus Reviews called the characters "interesting" and said that Lira is an "edgy, energetic storyteller" who had put a fresh spin on the commercial espionage thriller genre.

In The Washington Post, Patrick Anderson praised the "dynamite opening scene" and said the novel is "lively and fun to read" up until the "downer of an ending".

In a starred review in Booklist, David Pitt called the prose style "thrilling" and the book "an absolute stunner", despite the plot being "a tad by-the-numbers".
