= Counterparts (Lira novel) =

1998 novel by Gonzalo Lira

- Author: Gonzalo Lira
- Publication date: January 5, 1998
- ISBN: 978-0515124293

Counterparts is a 1998 American spy thriller novel written by Gonzalo Lira. Shortly after he graduated from Dartmouth College in October 1996, at age 28, Lira received a million dollar advance from G. P. Putnam's Sons. The unsolicited manuscript for Counterparts had been pulled from a slush pile by a literary agent and forwarded to editors at Putnam.

== Reception ==
Kirkus Reviews called it a "Dizzyingly sophisticated debut spy thriller, character-driven with big splashy action sequences".

Publishers Weekly praised the first 3/4ths of the book, for its pace, plot, and characters. They offer criticism to the later part of the book, for the abrupt change of personality for some of the major characters.

For Newsday, Jane Goldman wrote that it was "far-fetched and heartless... as arrogant and clever as its hero".

Ann Helmuth of the Orlando Sentinel panned the book, finding the plot "muddled and confused".

Patricia Holt, in The San Francisco Examiner, identified it as following a trend in mainstream commercial publishing of replacing what would conventionally be a male character with a female one. She wrote that Margaret, the female character in Counterparts, was a "tough gal" archetype, "something like a cross between June Cleaver and Arnold Schwarzenegger".
