= Alleged connections between Jeffrey Epstein and intelligence agencies =

The financier and child sex offender Jeffrey Epstein has been rumored to have connections to the intelligence agencies of Israel (Mossad), Russia (Intelligence agencies of Russia), and the United States (Central Intelligence Agency).

Epstein was rumored in 2021 by Vicky Ward in Rolling Stone to be associated with intelligence agencies, and bragged to a journalist that he knew the owner of the African port of Djibouti so well that he could use it for contraband.

Ghislaine Maxwell claimed in her July 2025 prison interview with Todd Blanche, that tales of Epstein's involvement with intelligence agencies during her relationship with him are "bullshit". Previously Maxwell maintained that Epstein's planes were "wire-tapped" for "leverage" and in conversation with Christina Oxenberg she speculated that audio and video recordings could potentially incriminate co-conspirators and high-profile figures who were associates of Epstein.

== Israel ==
Journalists Dylan Howard, Melissa Cronin and James Robertson linked Epstein to the Israeli Mossad in their book Epstein: Dead Men Tell No Tales. They relied for the most part on the former Israeli intelligence officer Ari Ben-Menashe. Epstein's alleged activities as an Israeli spy served to gather compromising material on powerful people in order to blackmail them. Epstein's victim Virginia Giuffre alleged Epstein to be an intelligence asset, linking on Twitter to a Reddit page, that alleged Epstein was a Mossad/CIA spy running a blackmail and honey pot ring to entrap elite oligarchs. Several people argue that it is unlikely that he worked for Mossad. A usual argument against Epstein's involvement with Mossad is that he had a working relationship with Ehud Barak, a prominent opponent of Netanyahu who commands Mossad.

Luke Tress from The Times of Israel reports that, In 2017, Ehud Barak asked Epstein whether an acquaintance had contacted Mossad agents through him. Epstein seemed confused and asked Barak if he had helped set up work with former Mossad agents. Barak told Epstein to call him back, but then did not answer the phone.

Journalists like Park MacDougald and Mark Hoffer ties the Epstein–Mossad connection (or even the theory that Epstein works for any intelligence agency, from the view of Hoffer), which they deem conspiracy theories, to the works of authors like Whitney Webb and Tiktoker Ian Carroll.

According to emails that came to light in November 2025, an Israeli intelligence officer stayed at Epstein's apartment in Manhattan several times between 2013 and 2016. In 2016, the Israeli government installed security equipment to a Manhattan building owned by his brother and managed by Epstein, for use by his associates and underage models. The emails also showed that Epstein was involved in the negotiation of security agreements between Israel and Mongolia and between Israel and the Ivory Coast. Epstein also attempted to establish a backchannel between the Russian and Israeli governments during the Syrian civil war.

Former CIA officer, author, and whistleblower John Kiriakou stated in July 2025 on Patrick Bet-David's podcast that he believed Epstein had been a Mossad "access agent" used to gain proximity to influential individuals and obtain sensitive information. Kiriakou described Epstein as a "textbook case" of such an operative. His allegations received media attention. No publicly available evidence confirms the allegations. In July 2026, US Vice President JD Vance said that Epstein had ties to the "highest levels" of Israeli intelligence on the Joe Rogan Experience.

=== Ehud Barak ===
Israeli Prime Minister Ehud Barak maintained a relationship with Epstein. According to Barak, they first met in 2003, and no evidence of an earlier meeting has been published to date. Barak stayed at Epstein’s apartments in New York several times over the years.

In 2015, Barak invested in Reporty, a tech startup that developed video streaming and geolocation software and later changed its name to Carbyne. A large portion of the funds invested by Barak was supplied by Jeffrey Epstein. For Epstein's 63rd birthday in 2016 a number of letters written for the occasion by high profile individuals were compiled as a birthday gift; among these were a letter from Barak and his wife. In 2023, it was revealed that Barak had visited Epstein around 30 times from 2013 to 2017 and had also flown on his jet. Barak denied any wrongdoing. Barak stated that on the two occasions he flew with Epstein on private planes, Barak's wife and security guards were with him. According to Barak, in one occasion, "he and his wife and some security guards paid a three-hour visit to Epstein's home in the U.S. Virgin Islands, but saw only Epstein and some maintenance workers there".

According to emails, Epstein invited Barak to meet Peter Thiel, a former director of Israeli signals intelligence, and two people in Vladimir Putin's circle; former Russian Deputy Minister of Economic Development Sergei Belyakov, and Viktor Vekselberg. Epstein arranged for Barak to meet Thiel (they had met once, in Davos), presumably to discuss geopolitics, in New York on 9 June 2014. In 2016, Epstein pitched Reporty to Thiel-founded Valar Ventures (in 2015 and 2016, Epstein invested US$40 million into funds managed by Valar), but the proposal was rejected as being premature. Valar's McCormack said they would try to reengage when the startup was more developed though. In 2018, the Founders Fund, another firm co-founded by Thiel, joined the $15 million Series B.

While scheduling the meeting with Thiel, Barak also tried to arrange to meet Putin's ally Viktor Vekselberg early in June 2014. An email sent in April 2015 shows that Barak asked Epstein for his opinion on Vekselberg-backed Fifth Dimension, a startup which later shut down after being sanctioned in 2018 by the US for alleged election meddling. This startup's leadership also included Benny Gantz (former Israel Defense Forces' chief-of-staff) and Ram Ben-Barak (former deputy Mossad director).

According to The San Francisco Standard, leaked emails show that, around the same time Barak and Epstein contacted Thiel, other Israeli officials tried to build a relationship with Thiel as well, "jockeying for Thiel's attention", often aiming at a "lucrative" job at Palantir. Among such officials were the diplomat Ron Prosor and intelligence officer Zivan Benisty, although their effort was separate from that of Barak.

== Russia ==
In 2026, Poland's prime minister Donald Tusk announced that he would like to see an investigation into the "likely" links between Epstein and Russian authorities. Epstein bragged repeatedly about advising "foreign leaders who included Vladimir Putin, Mohammed bin Zayed, Mohammed Bin Salman, various African dictators, Israel, the British — and, of course, the Americans" in the final decade of his life.

John Mark Dougan served as a deputy sheriff in Palm Beach County (where Epstein was first arrested) from 2005 until 2009. After fleeing to Russia in 2016 to avoid felony charges in Florida, he received political asylum and was later identified by U.S. and European officials as a central figure in Russian disinformation operations. According to British media reports and a biography by Andrew Lownie, British intelligence officials expressed concerns that Dougan had obtained files from the Palm Beach County investigation into Epstein. Lownie reported that Dougan allegedly brought copies of these documents and videos to Russia after fleeing the United States in 2016. Dougan himself has claimed to have 200 hours of Epstein footage, however as of 2026 he has not released anything connected to Epstein.

=== Other Countries ===
The reports also suggested that compromising material from the Epstein files may have been obtained by other foreign intelligence services, including those of Israel, Saudi Arabia, and Libya.

== United States ==
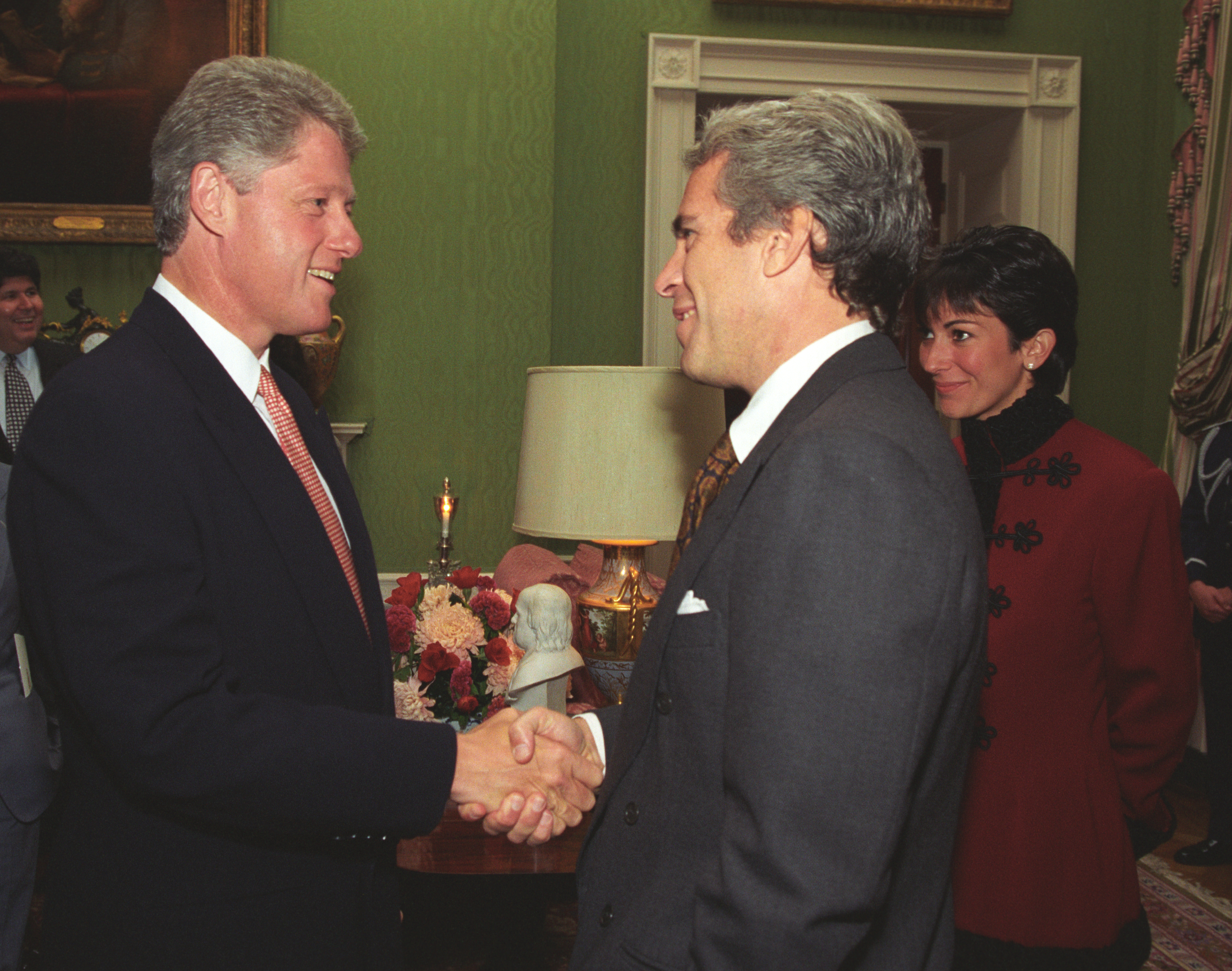
Epstein and Ghislaine Maxwell with US President Bill Clinton in 1993

According to a 2025 report by Drop Site News, Les Wexner and Epstein were involved in relocating Southern Air Transport (a CIA front organization with ties to the Iran-Contra affair and alleged CIA drug smuggling) from Miami to Columbus in the 1990s. Southern Air transported goods related to Wexner's businesses, but in 1996, Customs agents found a hidden shipment of cocaine on one of the planes. Southern Air was shut down in 1998 after Wexner had received federal aid for the relocation of the airline, just weeks before the CIA Inspector General released its official findings on Contra cocaine trafficking allegations. In the 1980s, Epstein himself had close ties to key figures in the Iran-Contra affair, such as Stanley Pottinger and Adnan Khashoggi.

As U.S. attorney in Florida, the later U.S. secretary of labor Alexander Acosta reached a settlement with Epstein's lawyers in 2008, which allowed him to receive a light prison sentence. Acosta later reportedly stated that he was told that Epstein "belonged to intelligence" and that the issue was above his "pay grade". According to Acosta, he was "pushed" to give Epstein a very good deal.

Eventual CIA director and diplomat William J. Burns met with Epstein three times. According to a CIA spokesperson, Burns hoped that Epstein would help him "transition to the private sector".

== Reactions ==
=== Vice President JD Vance on Joe Rogan July, 2026 ===
In July of 2026 sitting US Vice President JD Vance made the following remarks on the Joe Rogan show in response to Rogan asking the vice president if Jeffery Epstein was a Mossad agent:

Joe Rogan: "Well most people say he is Mossad"

VP JD Vance: "Yeah. Mossad or CIA ..., whether in America or Israel or both. Um, you know, look, he clearly had connections to the upper, the highest levels of American intelligence. He clearly had connections to the highest levels of Israeli intelligence."

"And yes, I've asked, were there, like, were there documents connecting Jeffrey Epstein directly to our intelligence agencies or anybody else's? And the answer is no. But if those documents existed, they wouldn't exist in 2026." (as he waves around a glass of a beverage for effect)

== See also ==
- Connections of Jeffrey Epstein
