= Paul Kenyon =

Journalist and author

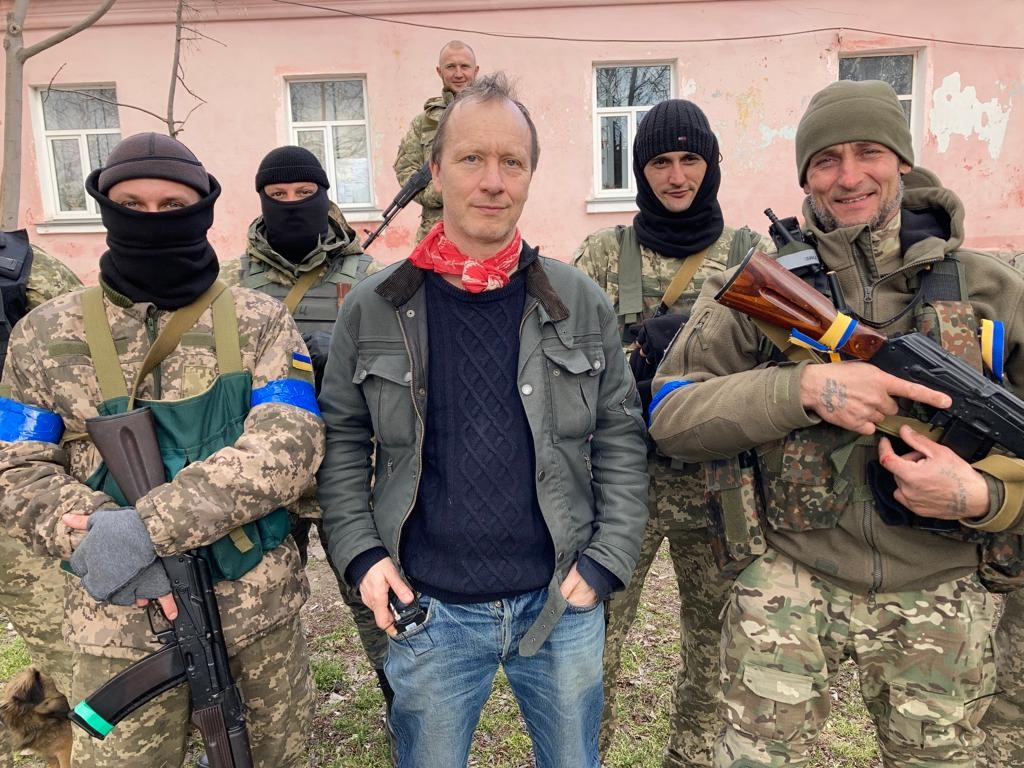
- Paul Kenyon reporting from the 2022 Russian invasion of Ukraine
- Education: Nottingham Trent University
- Occupations: Journalist, presenter, author
- Awards: Full list

Paul Kenyon (born 1966) is a BAFTA-winning journalist and author who has reported from more than 50 countries around the world, including multiple conflict zones, often for the BBC, and is the author of several books and podcasts. He began his career on BBC Panorama.

== Early life ==
Kenyon grew up in Bury and Penn, Buckinghamshire. He was raised as a Unitarian, but his family would sometimes attend Quaker meeting houses. Kenyon attended the Royal Grammar School, High Wycombe and then Bury Grammar School where he played 1st XV rugby and captained the athletics team. He studied social science at Nottingham Trent University.

== Career ==
Kenyon was Parliamentary Research Assistant to Lib Dem MP Simon Hughes from 1987 to 1988. He then worked as a reporter at a succession of Independent Local Radio stations: Viking Radio in Hull, Red Rose in Preston, and Piccadilly in Manchester, before becoming a producer at BBC Greater London Radio. After a spell as a political reporter for the BBC at Millbank, Kenyon became BBC South's Political Correspondent in 1993, and their Home Affairs Correspondent in 1994. In 1996 Kenyon became a BBC News correspondent, and in 1997 was offered his own investigative series, this time on BBC 2, called "Raising the Roof". It continued for two series, until Kenyon was offered his own prime time series on BBC1 – "Kenyon Confronts" which ran from 2001 to 2003. The show used secret filming and dramatic confrontations to expose criminals. Kenyon famously stopped a sham wedding just as the couple were making their vows, and faked his own funeral in Haiti during an investigation into insurance fraud.

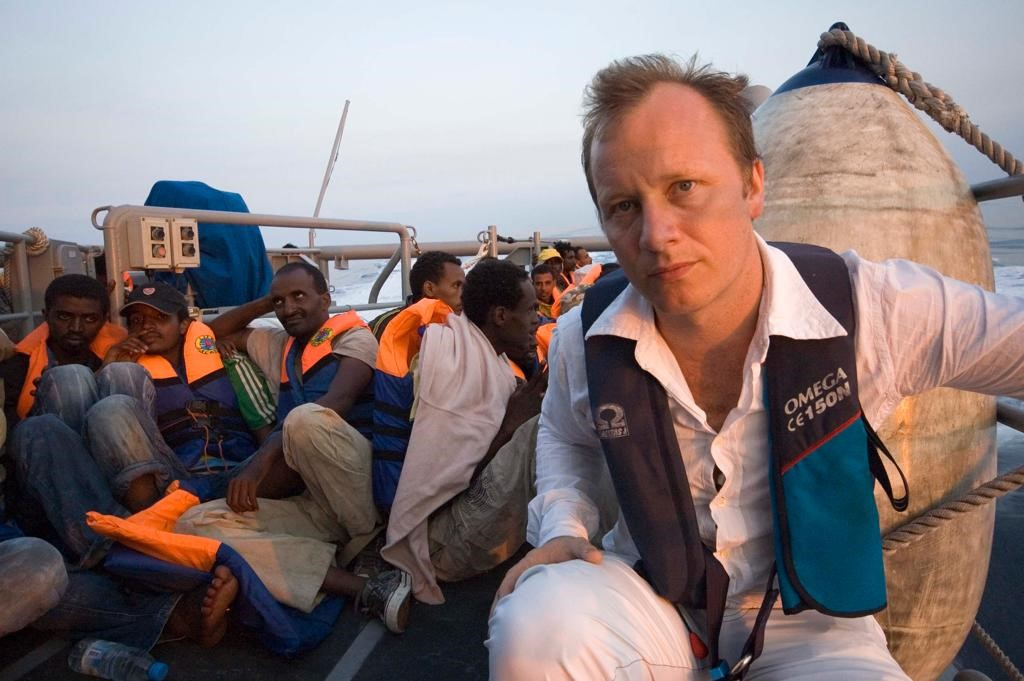
Paul Kenyon reporting on the 2009 migrant crisis

Kenyon then moved to BBC Panorama where his work began to encompass human rights, international conflicts and, in particular, Africa. In 2009 he was named Specialist Journalist of the Year by the Royal Television Society for a series of Panorama programmes on the dangerous migration route out of sub-Saharan Africa into Europe. At the same time he attacked tabloid newspapers for their "willful misreporting" of migration issues.

In 2005, Kenyon investigated drug cartels in Colombia for the BBC. While filming with the elite Jungla anti-narcotics unit of the Colombian police, the helicopter he was flying in came under fire from drug cartels near to Medellín, Kenyon and his crew escaped unhurt. Also in 2005, Kenyon carried out a dangerous assignment for the BBC and American television's Frontline World, covertly filming Iran's secret nuclear facilities, managing to secure footage of the nuclear plant at Natanz and of a refining unit in Tehran before being intercepted by Iranian security services; accused of spying, Kenyon was later released after pressure from the British embassy.

In 2011 Kenyon covered the war in Libya, confronting Colonel Gaddafi's son, Saadi, about the shooting of unarmed protestors, for which he won "Best Current Affairs Documentary – Middle East" from the Association of International Broadcasters. In 2012 Kenyon was awarded a BAFTA for a Panorama exposing the abuse of patients at a care home in Bristol; "Undercover Care: The Abuse Exposed."

In March 2014, Kenyon witnessed the 2014 Russian annexation of Crimea, reporting for Panorama he was among a small group of journalists at the Belbeck Airbase in Sevastopol, Crimea as it was surrounded and taken over by Russian troops, and witnessing the first gunshots of the conflict.

In February 2022 he reported from Kyiv during the Russian invasion of Ukraine. Kenyon and his team were the first journalists on the ground at the now infamous Battle of Hostomel Airport on 24 February 2022, witnessing an intense gun battle as the airport became the scene of fierce fighting. Kenyon also reported from the Battle of Mykolayiv in mid-March 2022 for both Panorama and the Sunday Express.

In late 2025, Kenyon released a podcast called Two Nottingham Lads, about pro-Russian British journalist Graham Phillips and Ukrainian fighter Aiden Aslin, both from the city of Nottingham.

== Books ==
Kenyon's first book, "I am Justice; a journey out of Africa" was published in 2009. The BBC's Fergal Keane described it as "a beautiful book which carries the agony and hope of Africa in every page." Kenyon was also a contributing author to the 2011 book "Investigative Journalism; Dead or Alive."

His second major work, "Dictatorland: The Men Who Stole Africa", was published in 2018, and was a Financial Times Book of the Year.

His third book, "Children of the Night: the Strange and Epic Story of Modern Romania", was published in 2021. It weaves the story of his wife's family in Romania into the country's broader history. Writing in The Critic, Jessica Douglas-Home described it as "an extraordinary book and in some ways a brilliant one."

== Personal life ==
Kenyon is married to Flavia Kenyon, whom he met in Bucharest in the mid-1990s. She is the first barrister of Romanian origin in the UK.

After making a programme which exposed the abuse of patients in Indian drug trials, Kenyon accepted an invitation to become patron of The Aware Foundation which helps educate underprivileged children in India, a role he shares with John Wright, the former coach of the India national cricket team.

== Awards ==
Year	Award body	Category	Film Title	References
2005	Royal Television Society	Winner – Current Affairs programme of the Year	BBC Panorama: Exposed: The Bail Hostel Scandal	
2009	Royal Television Society	Winner – Specialist Journalist of the Year	BBC Panorama: Europe or Die Trying	
2009	BAFTA (Scotland)	Winner – Best News and Current Affairs programme	BBC Panorama: Britain’s Homecare Scandal	
2010	Spanish Academy of Television	Winner – International Recognition Award	BBC Panorama: Chocolate: The Bitter Truth	
2011	The Association for International Broadcasting (AIB)	Winner – Current Affairs Documentary (Middle East)	BBC Panorama: Fighting Gaddafi	
2012	Royal Television Society	Winner – Scoop of the Year Winner – Current Affairs- Home	BBC Panorama: Undercover Care: The Abuse Exposed	
2012	The Broadcast Awards	Winner – Best Documentary	BBC Panorama: Undercover Care: The Abuse Exposed	
2012	BAFTA	Winner – Best Documentary	BBC Panorama: Undercover Care: The Abuse Exposed	

== Bibliography ==
=== Books ===
- I Am Justice: A Journey Out of Africa (Penguin Random House, 2009)
- Dictatorland: The Men Who Stole Africa (Head of Zeus, 2018)
- Children of the Night: The Strange and Epic Story of Modern Romania (Head of Zeus, 2021)

=== Critical studies and reviews of Kenyon's work ===
Dictatorland

Stanley, Aaron (Winter 2019). "Power trip". Carnegie Reporter. 11 (1): 89–90.

Birrell, Ian (30 December 2017). "Review: Dictatorland: The Men Who Stole Africa by Paul Kenyon". The Times.

O'Loughlin, Ed (10 February 2018). "Travels through Dictatorland: how African despots cling to power". The Irish Times.

Children of the Night

Dunlop, Tessa. "It all started with Dracula". No. 14 August 2021. The Spectator.

Vock, Ido (9 September 2021). "Reviewed in short: New books by Bobby Duffy, Paul Kenyon, Carol Leonnig and Claire-Louise Bennett". The New Statesman.
