= What's On Kyiv =

What's On cover April 2012

What's On Kyiv or What's On Kiev was a weekly, then monthly, then online English-language magazine published in Ukraine's capital Kyiv which covered both Kyiv, and Ukraine at large. As of late 2020, the magazine is defunct.

What's On provided information about places, events, etc. in Kyiv, similarly to Time Out. What's On was available in print in many bars and hotels, as well as news stands, embassies, airlines, and various other business, tourism, and entertainment places.

== History ==
In the early 2000s, What's On was owned by CPL Group and Euromedia / Euro Media Ukraine Ltd.

Around 2007, editor-in-chief Peter Dickinson (Ukrainian: Пітер Дікінсон) left for Business Ukraine, and Neil Campbell (Ukrainian: Ніл Кемпбелл) took on the role. Due to the 2008 financial crisis, Telegraaf Media Group (TMG) Ukraine, that at the time owned various publications including What's On, decided to sell them at the end of 2008. In early April 2009, editor-in-chief Neil Campbell joined up with his friend Paul Nyland (Ukrainian: Пол Найланд) to found PAN Publishing and purchase What's On. Around 2014, PAN Publishing paused publication of What's On, citing declining advertising revenue.

What's On was founded in 1999, the first Editor-In-Chief was Amanda Pitt. Peter Dickinson then edited between 2001 and 2007, followed by Neil Campbell. Campbell handed over editorial duties in 2011 to Lana Nicole Niland. What's On was then owned by PAN Publishing, who also published Panorama, the in-flight magazine of Ukraine International Airlines. What's On was read widely in the expatriate (business and diplomatic) community, and distributed free of charge directly to embassies and businesses, as well as around the city. What's On was also read by large numbers of English speaking Ukrainians. The magazine featured news articles, also articles on Ukrainian society, culture, politics, history, business, showbusiness and interviews with prominent people either Ukrainian, or connected to Ukraine. What's On also had a travel and nightlife section, as well as restaurant reviews, and full Kyiv entertainment listings.

In 2012, British journalist Graham Phillips worked at the magazine. What's On Kyiv ceased regular publication after Euromaidan in 2013/14, which the magazine had supported. In the summer of 2014 a special edition of What's On was published, the "Chronicle of a Revolution" - a compendium of the news and photo coverage and some feature articles that had been published in What's On during the 12-week period of Euromaidan.

After a break from early 2014, What's On returned in September 2017, published on a monthly basis, owned by Outpost Publishing, Lana Nicole Niland was the owner and Editor-in-Chief of this publication. In 2019 the magazine went online only, and in late 2020, the magazine announced on their official website that they were here in Kyiv and will be back in business with and for you soon. Since then there have been no further publications, and as of 2022 What's On is defunct.

== See also ==
- Kyiv Post
- The Kyiv Independent
