= Apache.be =

Belgian news website

Apache or Apache.be is a co-operatively owned and reader-funded independent Belgian news website specializing in investigative journalism, in-depth reporting, and analysis. Based in Antwerp, it was founded in October 2009 by a group of journalists, several of whom had had employment contracts with national newspapers terminated in the wake of the 2008 financial crisis. On 9 June 2022 the Antwerp Court of Appeal upheld the site's acquittal of stalking and breach of privacy while investigating the activities of Land Invest Group, in a decision that cited the detrimental impact of a strategic lawsuit against public participation.
