= Graham Phillips (blogger) =

British blogger (born 1979)

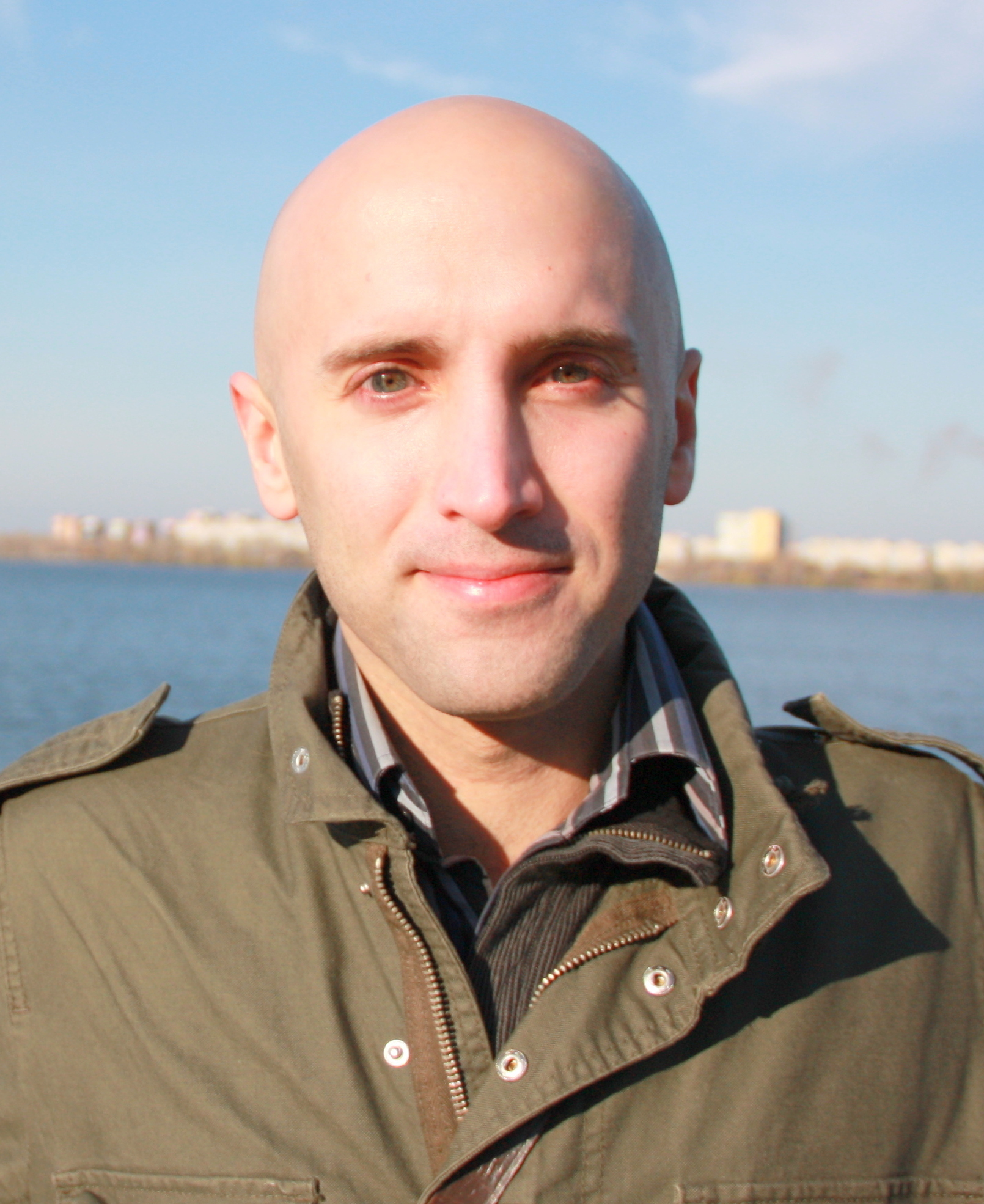
- Phillips in 2012
- Born: 26 January 1979 (age 47); United Kingdom
- Occupations: Blogger; Journalist

YouTube information
- Channel: Graham Phillips
- Years active: 2009–2023 (channel deleted by YouTube)

Graham William Phillips (born 26 January 1979) is a British blogger and journalist primarily known for his coverage of the Russo-Ukrainian war from Donbas, and reporting from occupied Crimea.

Phillips, who describes himself as an independent British journalist, was sanctioned by the government of the United Kingdom in 2022 for producing and publishing "propagandist video content which glorifies the Russian invasion of Ukraine and its atrocities, and promotes disinformation advanced by Russia as a justification for the invasion". Phillips was the first British-born UK citizen to be added to the UK sanctions list, and remains the only British-born national to be sanctioned by the UK. He is also sanctioned by the European Union and Ukraine due to his work from Donbas. Phillips states that he "shows the truth about Donbass" and has long accused the Ukrainian Government of being "Nazis" and of "indiscriminately shelling civilians".

Prior to 2012 Phillips was a civil servant in London, and a noted supporter of the England football team. From 2010–2013, living in Ukraine, he worked as a journalist at a magazine in Kyiv. From 2013, during Euromaidan in Ukraine, then the Donbas War in eastern Ukraine, Phillips initially worked as a stringer for Russian state-owned television networks RT (2013–2014) and Zvezda (2014–2015), before going on to report for his own YouTube channel, building his channel up to hundreds of thousands of subscribers, and over 112 million views, before YouTube deleted it in 2023. Russian and pro-Russian Donbas authorities have awarded him multiple medals for his work. Phillips was an active supporter of Brexit in the 2016 UK referendum. Writing on Phillips' work from the Donbas in 2017, the BBC described him as "often in the midst of tearing bullets and toppling buildings. His daredevil style has drawn the attention of audiences". Since the 2022 Russian invasion of Ukraine, Phillips has made videos from the occupied territories, sometimes wearing Russian combat uniform and insignia, and driving a Range Rover displaying the Russian Z symbol on the Donbas frontlines.

In July 2022, several months after the Russian invasion of Ukraine began, the government of the United Kingdom imposed sanctions on Phillips, stating that his work "supports and promotes actions and policies which destabilise Ukraine and undermine or threaten the territorial integrity, sovereignty, or independence of Ukraine". Sanctions also caused Phillips' YouTube channel to be terminated. In October 2024, Phillips was granted political asylum in Russia. In November 2025, it was announced that Phillips was under investigation by the Metropolitan Police for war crimes related to multiple alleged breaches of the Geneva Conventions, including Phillips' 2022 interview with British-Ukrainian prisoner of war (POW) Aiden Aslin. Phillips has denied the accusations, and continues his work from Russian-occupied Donbas, notably Mariupol, where he lives.

== Early life ==
Phillips' birthplace has been listed as either Nottingham, or Newcastle in England, or Dundee in Scotland. A 2025 BBC podcast described him as a 'Nottingham Lad'. He attended Perth High School, and graduated from the University of Dundee with a dual degree in philosophy and history in the early 2000s. During his student years, Phillips had started to do some freelance journalism, faxing articles into The Scotsman, and doing an internship with The Guardian. He also tried his hand at stand-up comedy at this time, performing alongside Miles Jupp, Frankie Boyle, and Russell Brand, sometimes using the pseudonym 'Brandon Reed', and performing more than once at the Edinburgh Festival Fringe. In 2000, Phillips backpacked around the US with his brothers, in particular visiting the steel mill location in Robocop, one of his favourite films. While at Dundee University, Phillips led a campaign to have Baywatch actor David Hasselhoff elected as rector in 2001; Hasselhoff said the rector nomination was "a great personal honour", but declined the post due to other commitments. Along with local artist Benni Esposito, Phillips ran a Hasselhoff-themed comedy show in Dundee, which later transferred to London's West End.

After graduating from university, Phillips moved to London where he worked a number of years as a civil servant for the now-defunct Central Office of Information reviewing government websites and preparing reports for the Parliament of the United Kingdom, later speaking of his frustration at the mundanity of this work.

== Ukraine ==
=== Early years in Ukraine (2010–2013) ===
Phillips first visited Ukraine in 2009 when he travelled to Dnipropetrovsk to support the England football team. After going to the 2010 FIFA World Cup in South Africa as an England fan, Phillips then moved to Ukraine, looking for the chance to return to journalism, which he had last engaged in in his student years. He was 31, and initially began working in Kyiv as an English teacher, also starting a blog, Brit in Ukraine, with articles on politics, history, life in Ukraine, UEFA Euro 2012 and sex tourism, including entries about prostitutes, foreign-bride hunters, sex tourists, and reviews of brothels. The blog was renamed to 'Graham W Phillips', then the 'Truth Speaker', and eventually deleted.

In 2012, Phillips started work in Kyiv as a journalist for the English-language What's On magazine, his work there included interviews with Chris Rea and Sergei Baltacha. After leaving What's On, Phillips worked as a freelance journalist from Ukraine, publishing several articles, including two for the New Statesman, three for the Kyiv Post and three for Pravda, among others. In November 2012, Phillips' article for Pravda.ru opined about the gloomy atmosphere in Ukraine after the highs of Euro 2012, and worries for the future.

Phillips's work as a freelance journalist in Ukraine often focused on crime; he covered the murder of Oksana Makar, a Ukrainian woman raped and burned alive, and Barry Pring, a British man killed outside Kyiv. In early 2013, Phillips self-published a book, Ukraine – Men, Women, Sex, Murder, which culminated with his investigation into the death of Barry Pring. The book was removed from sale after legal action by Anna Ziuzina, the woman he accused of Pring's murder.

For his blog in 2012 and 2013, Phillips wrote a series of articles highly critical of Ukrainian nationalist politician Stepan Bandera and the Ukrainian nationalist party Svoboda, referring to Bandera as a "Nazi", and Svoboda as "neo-Nazis". Journalist Paul Kenyon wrote of Phillips: "During the Maidan Revolution in February 2014, Phillips was reporting from a rally of the notoriously far-right Svoboda Party, when he observed dozens of people throwing Nazi salutes. It was an earth-shattering moment for the fresh-faced young journalist from Nottingham. When the Kremlin blamed “Nazis” for the overthrow of their puppet Viktor Yanukovych, Graham Phillips decided to take their side."

Phillips began actively writing blog posts criticising Euromaidan, including referring to Maidan activists as "terrorists", also doing interviews with Russian state channel RT at this time, and filming street interviews across Ukraine, for his YouTube channel.

=== 2014–2021 ===
In March 2014, living in Odesa, Phillips drove to Crimea, as Russia took control of the peninsula. Phillips wrote an article for Politico magazine, writing that most of the people he had spoken to in Crimea supported Russia. Phillips then went to work part-time for RT as a reporter in Donbas in April 2014, covering the Russo-Ukrainian War, after multiple RT crews were denied entry into Ukraine. Phillips said at this time, that although he was working as a freelancer and stringer for RT, his priority was developing his own YouTube channel. Phillips often reported from Crimea in the years after the 2014 Russian annexation.

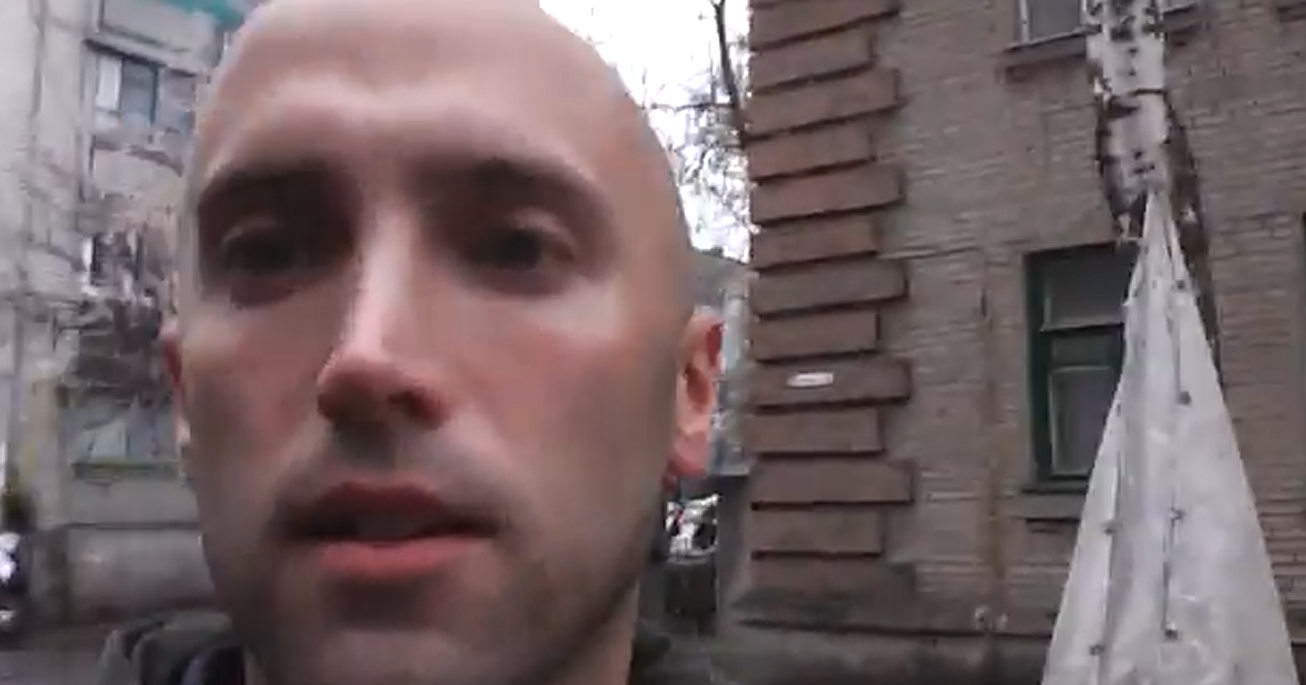
Graham Phillips in Sloviansk, 2014

The Guardian wrote in May 2014 that Phillips had "gained notoriety during the conflict in the east for his gonzo-style subjective reports and his sharp online criticism of the Maidan protests and the new Ukrainian government." Much of the attention on Phillips was generated by his prolific use of his YouTube channel, with him often uploading 20-30 videos per day, something he combined with his work for RT. Phillips' wide-eyed style of reporting earned him a comparison to Timothy Treadwell in Grizzly Man. In the course of doing video reports from Donbas in Spring of 2014, Phillips was initially taken captive by both sides. In May 2014, Phillips was detained by the National Guard of Ukraine while reporting from Mariupol. According to RT, they demanded that Phillips delete the footage he had filmed and when Phillips refused, he was detained, held in captivity for a day, and then taken to Kyiv by car with a black bag on his head and a gun pointed at him, as he reported. In Kyiv he was told he must immediately leave Ukraine. At this time, Phillips was described as a 'sometime RT correspondent'.

After covering the 2014 FIFA World Cup in Brazil as a journalist and England football fan, Phillips returned to report from Donbas in the summer of 2014, an apparent violation of the terms of his May release. Upon going to Donetsk International Airport to report, Phillips was quickly arrested by a group of 18 armed Ukrainian soldiers. Phillips was held in captivity for three days then deported into Poland and banned from Ukraine for three years. Phillips stated that he was maltreated by the Armed Forces of Ukraine during his detention at the airport, who had stolen his car, a Rover 75, while Ukraine accused Phillips of "supporting terrorism" as a "Kremlin propagandist". In breach of his ban, Phillips returned again to Ukraine in August 2014. In November 2014, Phillips was seriously wounded in the back by shrapnel while reporting from the frontlines of the war in Donbas. At this time, Phillips was working for Russian state channel Zvezda, as a freelancer, having parted company with RT following his second deportation from Ukraine, along with uploading videos to his YouTube channel.

In late 2014, Russian channel NTV released a film Военкор ('War Correspondent'), inspired by Phillips' early experiences reporting in Ukraine. In March 2015, after having covered the Battle of Debaltseve, Phillips returned to the UK, where he was detained at Heathrow Airport and questioned by MI5 about his work from Donbas; no charges were presented against Phillips, who was released after several hours.

In early 2015, Phillips was added to the Ukrainian Myrotvorets site, which lists so-called 'enemies of Ukraine', and encourages action against them. Back in the UK in Spring 2015, Phillips organised a fundraising event to raise humanitarian aid for Donbas. The Daily Beast accused Phillips of forcefully ejecting a heckler in crowd who had shouted that Givi was a 'murderer'. Responding to criticism of his Donbas charity event blurring journalistic lines, Phillips responded "I think within the scope of journalist you can do some good." Phillips at this time declared that his future would be as a 'completely crowdfunded, independent journalist', doing reportage only for his YouTube channel going forward. Also in April 2015, Phillips attempted to storm into the Museum of Stepan Bandera in London, shouting that it was a "Nazi collaborator museum"; he was escorted from the premises by the police. In mid-2015 Phillips also reportedly succeeded in producing Royal Mail stamps featuring Donbass militia commanders Givi and Motorola. Later in 2015 Phillips was back in Donbas, and Inverse published an article based on his work, namely his drone footage from the destroyed city of Pervomaisk, Luhansk Oblast; Phillips stated that drone footage allowed people to witness war at a 'visceral' level, and that 'the destruction of Pervomaisk was a result of shelling by Ukrainian forces'.

In March 2016, Phillips released a film called Aramis, about the life of a Donbas militant he had known, who was killed in action. The premiere was held in Saint Petersburg. On 16 March 2016, Phillips was detained in Riga, Latvia, for disrupting the Remembrance Day of the Latvian Legionnaires events, shouting that they were 'glorifying fascists', and resisting police orders, after which he was deported to Russia and banned from re-entering Latvia for three years. Latvia's Interior Minister, Rihards Kozlovskis blasted Phillips for his “provocation” in the Latvian capital. Deported from Latvia into Russia, Phillips headed to Crimea and in May 2016, Phillips was awarded a medal and certificate of official gratitude for his work from the city of Yalta. Then mayor of Yalta Andrey Rostenko praised Phillips for the 'objective information' he showed from Crimea. Also in May, Phillips presented his film about Victory Day celebrations in Russian-occupied Crimea that year. Later in May 2016, while filming at Taigan (safari park), Phillips was attacked by a lion, however he laughed the incident off. Phillips was also filmed kissing a Russian bear at the safari park.

In June 2016, Phillips travelled around Europe, doing what he described as a 'Brexit reportage project'. He began in France, asking young men in the Calais Jungle, why they were planning to come to the UK. Phillips' confrontational tone and questioning, resulted in an incident in the 'Jungle'. Phillips then went to the Germany vs Ukraine football match at UEFA Euro 2016 at the Stade Pierre-Mauroy near Lille, asking Ukrainian football supporters what they thought of the war in Donbas. Phillips' provocative questioning and manner resulted in multiple confrontational incidents, and Phillips' Rover 75 was broken into, with personal items stolen. Despite being banned from Latvia in March, Phillips then returned there in June, as part of his 'Brexit project'. Upon his return to Latvia, while banned, he referred to the Latvian government as 'morons'. On 2 August 2016, together with German journalist and activist Billy Six, he entered the Berlin office of the investigative journalism organisation Correctiv without permission and demanded an interview with Marcus Bensmann, who was investigating Malaysia Airlines Flight 17. Phillips, who had been conducting his own investigation into MH17, repeatedly accused Bensmann of lying, shouting "Lying press!", while filming the incident, and refusing to leave. Correctiv called the police, however Phillips and Six evaded them.

In September 2016, Ukraine accused Phillips of provocation for his reportage from the Crimean border, where he crossed the line from Russian-controlled Crimea into Ukraine-controlled territory, telling the Ukrainian border guards that 'Crimea is Russia'. Back in Donbas, in a 17 September 2016 video published by Phillips, he is seen shortly before a prisoner exchange having a verbal altercation with a disabled Ukrainian prisoner of war who had lost both of his arms and sight in a mine blast. The video caused outrage in Ukraine. The Kharkiv Human Rights Protection Group called for journalist NGOs to condemn Phillips' actions. Judith Gough, British Ambassador to Ukraine, said that she was appalled by the incident. The Ukrainian POW interviewed by Phillips, Vladimir Zhemchugov, for his part, criticised Phillips for 'doing three interviews' with him, and not publishing the one where he (Zhemchugov) 'got the better of Phillips' in their verbal spar. After the Zhemchugov interview, Ukrainians organised a petition to then UK Prime Minister Theresa May to strip Phillips of his British passport, and ban him from leaving the UK; however, the UK replied that they had 'no grounds' to do this.

Back in London, in January 2017, Phillips attempted to disrupt an event marking the 25th anniversary of diplomatic relations between the UK and Ukraine in the British Parliament, by asking provocative questions about why the UK was supporting Ukraine 'killing civilians in Donbas'. Phillips was forcefully ejected from the event to cries of "liar!" from the crowd. Also in January 2017 in the UK, Phillips, in the capacity of 'freelance journalist' gave evidence in the inquest into the death of Barry Pring, setting out results of his investigation indicating that Pring had been killed by his Ukrainian wife Anna Ziuzina. Although the January 2017 inquest returned a verdict of the 'unlawful killing' of Barry Pring, incriminating Ziuzina, the High Court quashed this verdict, and a new inquest in 2021 cleared Ziuzina. In February 2017, Phillips was accused by a Ukrainian prosecutor's office of taking an active role in the information and propaganda activities of the Donetsk People's Republic and Luhansk People's Republic, and having collaborated, and been friends, with separatist leaders Givi and Motorola. From mid-2017, Phillips was back reporting from Donbas. He released a film he made in tribute to a young Luhansk journalist he had known, Irina Gurtyak, who was killed in a car crash. Writing of Phillips in mid-2017, BBC News stated: "Phillips is highly critical of the Ukrainian government and appears to back the break-up of the country". In late 2017, early 2018, Phillips went to breakaway South Ossetia to make a documentary film.

At the start of January 2018, Phillips released a film about the children's camp Artek in Crimea. Later in January 2018, Phillips released a film, A Brit in Crimea, in which he took a Scottish businessman on holiday to the Russian-annexed Crimea. The premiere of the film was held in Moscow, it was then released on Phillips' YouTube channel. Phillips was refused accreditation by FIFA to cover the 2018 FIFA World Cup in Russia, so he covered it instead, and attended matches, as an England football fan. After England were eliminated from the World Cup in the semi-finals, Phillips returned home to London. In London, in August 2018, Phillips gatecrashed an exhibition at the Embassy of Georgia, London by Gia Bugadze dedicated to the 10th anniversary of the Russo-Georgian War, and was arrested by police for disrupting the event, with Phillips having shouted that the exhibition was "propaganda" and that its attendants were "NATO zombies". His actions were condemned by the Embassy of Ukraine, London who called on the Foreign & Commonwealth Office to investigate Phillips' "terrorist activity".

In early October 2018, Phillips disrupted a press conference with Bellingcat founder Eliot Higgins, accusing him of being a 'NATO agent', and insulting his integrity. Later in October 2018, Phillips released a documentary on his YouTube channel, accusing the Ukrainian nationalist politician Stepan Bandera of being a Nazi. He then travelled to Bandera's grave, in Munich, tearing down Ukrainian flags which had been placed there and placing a placard on the grave reading "Ukrainian Nazi Stepan Bandera is buried here". In response to Phillips' actions, Ukrainian nationalist MP Ihor Mosiychuk stated “This monster (Phillips) should live in constant fear, because if European law enforcement officers do not come after him, then Ukrainian nationalists will come after him.” The incident was investigated by the Munich Police Department; however, no charges were presented against Phillips. Further, in October 2018, in Vienna, Phillips was accused by the then Ukrainian ambassador to Austria Olexander Scherba of coming to his premises, calling him a 'fascist', and attempting to provoke him into a fight. In November 2018 Phillips was banned from Twitter. Late 2018 saw Phillips once again reporting from Donbas.

In 2019, Phillips went to Kosovo, recording videos in which he called the country a terrorist state, the Kosovo Liberation Army a "terrorist organization", and Ramush Haradinaj, Hashim Thaçi and other Kosovar leaders "war criminals and terrorists", which sparked outrage in Kosovo. Phillips received death threats for his comments and was banned from Kosovo for life. Phillips then did video reports from Serbia, which were critical of the NATO bombing of Yugoslavia. Also in 2019, Phillips was doing videos from the British overseas territory of Gibraltar. In 2019 Phillips did another reportage project from Russian-occupied Crimea, being the only western journalist to film at a public tour of the Black Sea Fleet, including the Moskva, which would be sunk by Ukrainian forces three years later. In 2019 film Opolchenochka (Militia Girl), one of the characters, journalist Michael Felps, is based on Phillips. Later in 2019 saw Phillips back reporting in Donbas. Phillips went to enthusiastically report on the first train on the Crimean Bridge, before going to do video reports from Vladivostok.

The onset of the COVID-19 pandemic in 2020 saw Phillips back in the UK, describing himself as 'sceptical' about the pandemic, and strongly opposed to compulsory lockdowns and vaccinations. Phillips covered Black Lives Matter events in London in 2020, describing himself as an opponent to the movement. In early 2021, Phillips released a documentary about the sinking of the MS Estonia, based around his interview with British survivor Paul Barney. Phillips then released a documentary about the Jasenovac concentration camp in Croatia. In 2021, Phillips went on a hiking expedition to the location of the 1959 Dyatlov Pass incident, in the Ural Mountains of Russia. He spoke positively of the experience, and scenery, but stated he would not do reportage on the subject as his priority was his work from Donbas. Phillips stated that he had been unable to access Donbas in 2020 due to COVID-19 restrictions, however he returned to do a documentary from Donetsk in the summer of 2021. Later in 2021, Phillips travelled around Siberia doing videos, and documentaries.

=== Russian invasion of Ukraine (2022–) ===
==== Return to Donbas, Aiden Aslin interview ====
At the onset of the Russian invasion of Ukraine in late February 2022, Phillips was at home in London. He welcomed the invasion, saying it was needed to "denazify" Ukraine. By early March he was already crossing the border from Belarus into Russian-occupied Ukraine, in breach of his lifetime ban from Ukraine. In an interview at this time, Phillips dismissed support for Ukraine as "virtue signalling" for a "fashionable cause" and likened it to the support for Black Lives Matter. Phillips remained reporting from the Chernihiv Oblast of Ukraine in March, releasing several videos. At this time, Phillips was attracting condemnation from UK media for his work, and position. Russian media reported that Phillips left the Chernihiv area in early April, going to the city of Tyumen in Siberia, to collect his Jaguar, and then driving the several thousand kilometres to Donbas, collecting "humanitarian aid" for Mariupol en route. Phillips published a video at this time claiming that the Bucha massacre had been staged by Ukraine.

Shortly after returning to Donbas, in April 2022, Phillips would attract heavy criticism for his interview with Aiden Aslin. On 18 April 2022, Phillips, in Donetsk, interviewed Aslin, a British citizen who had been captured by the Russian Armed Forces whilst serving in the Ukrainian military and fighting in Mariupol. Phillips uploaded video of the interview to his YouTube channel, in which Aslin could be seen in handcuffs. Australian-British barrister Geoffrey Robertson said the interview could be a violation of international law, saying "coercive interrogation of prisoners of war for propaganda purposes is contrary to the Geneva Conventions", and said that Phillips may face a war crime prosecution as a result of the interview. Former British Cabinet minister Damian Green described him as the modern-day equivalent of World War II Nazi propagandist Lord Haw-Haw. On 20 April, Phillips was criticised by British Prime Minister Boris Johnson and by Member of Parliament Robert Jenrick in the House of Commons. Johnson accused Phillips of producing propaganda messages and Jenrick said "the interviewer Graham Phillips is in danger of prosecution for war crimes". On 23 April, YouTube announced that it had removed Phillips' interview of Aslin citing privacy violations, and demonetised his channel.

Phillips stated Aslin himself "requested the interview". "Let anyone serious present any real charges against me, and I'll fully answer all of them – I'm an independent journalist of complete integrity, and absolutely sound of conscience and ethics", he said. After a prisoner exchange, Aslin has spoken about his interview with Phillips, in several interviews, and a book. In a November 2022 interview, Aslin denied he "requested" the interview with Phillips, and described both Phillips' questions and his answers as "scripted and rehearsed". In an April 2023 interview, he described the behaviour of Phillips as "normal when off camera" but going "psychotic" when cameras were turned on.

In September 2022, The Sun published an article based on an interview with Aslin, who described Phillips as a "war criminal", and with another prisoner who claimed to have been interviewed by Philips; the newspaper said Philips had taunted British POWs and was under police investigation. The Sun corrected the article that month after a complaint by Philips, as the second prisoner said Philips' face was obscured so couldn't be identified with certainty and it later transpired he was interviewed by a different person. The Independent Press Standards Organisation then investigated the case, concluding in March 2023 that the correction was insufficiently prominent and that there was no evidence Phillips was under investigation by the police.

In April and May 2022, Phillips extensively covered the Battle for Azovstal from Mariupol. Russian media also reported that he engaged in searching for people who had gone missing during war in Mariupol, locating and then evacuating relatives, including the brother of actress Darya Jurgens. Phillips moved from Mariupol onto covering Donetsk, and in June 2022 Russian media reported that he had saved two women under shelling by evacuating them in his car. Phillips posted videos of himself behind Russian lines, sometimes wearing Russian military fatigues with Russian insignia, and displaying the pro-war Z symbol on his clothes and car. He also posted an image of himself posing in front of a Russian flag wearing combat uniform and "British camouflage" apparently taken from a dead Ukrainian soldier. He has conducted multiple interviews over the years with Donbas separatist leader Denis Pushilin, and is known to have been well acquainted with Donbas separatist leader Alexander Zakharchenko. Phillips has carried out extensive humanitarian aid work in Donbas, including regular deliveries of humanitarian aid to a children's home in Lutuhyne.

==== Sanctions, continued work from Donbas ====
In July 2022, Phillips became the only British-born citizen to date to be sanctioned by his own country. Phillips responded: "I didn't have any opportunity to defend myself, no-one notified me, there are no real charges against me.” Phillips said he would make an appeal against his sanctions, calling them “ridiculous, illegal and dangerous”. According to the Foreign Office official, the sanctions were because he “has produced and published media content that supports and promotes actions and policies which destabilise Ukraine and undermine or threaten the territorial integrity, sovereignty, or independence of Ukraine”. Phillips was also sanctioned by Ukraine in 2022, and banned from the country.

In March 2023 Phillips shared a video of an unarmed Ukrainian soldier being summarily executed, describing him as a Nazi. In August 2023, Phillips stated that he was taking the UK Government to the High Court to challenge his sanctions, and that in doing so he is "standing up for the rights of every British citizen... It may be the opinion of the UK government that my work 'destabilizes Ukraine', but that is not a crime. Furthermore, it is a subjective misrepresentation of my work...I am an independent British journalist doing my best, with soundness of mind and conscience, and clearness of purpose - that is to show the truth in everything I do." Phillips' case was first heard at the UK High Court in November 2023, initially by Mr Justice Swift. Mr Justice Swift removed himself from duties, and Phillips' case was heard again at the UK High Court in December 2023, this time by Mr Justice Johnson. Phillips' lawyers argued that Phillips was being unfairly punished by 'Orwellian' sanctions without crime by the UK State, adding that sanctions were denying Phillips "priceless time" in the UK with his elderly parents, and daughter, and had caused him to receive multiple death threats. Mr Justice Johnson, in his January 2024 judgment ruling in favour of the UK Government against Phillips, stated that the sanctions on him were a "proportionate interference with Phillips's human rights" in the "legitimate aim of protecting the UK's national security". The Court judgment stated that Phillips had "published propagandist video content which glorifies the Russian invasion of Ukraine and its atrocities, and promotes disinformation advanced by Russia". Mr Justice Johnson noted that Phillips has mostly stayed in Russian-occupied regions of Ukraine since 2022, and has been given access to the frontline by the Russian military.

"(Mr Phillips) decided to set his face against an overwhelming international consensus, to align himself with Russia's invasion of Ukraine, to travel to the frontline, and to help Russia fight its propaganda war. He has not shown any journalistic responsibility or ethics".

The American Conservative published an article by Peter Hitchens in March 2024, in which Hitchens, supporting Phillips, said the sanctions made him a "prisoner of the [UK] state". In 2024, due to a personal vendetta, American conspiracy theorist John Dougan published a fake website making unsubstantiated claims of sexual impropriety against Phillips. In October 2024, in Russian-occupied Donbas territory where Phillips continued reporting from and living, he was granted political asylum by Russia, stating in Russian, that “Above all I am a British person. It is just that my country has decided to make my life a living hell because I showed - and show - the truth about Donbass.”. In April 2025, the UK imposed further sanctions on Phillips. In June 2025, Phillips was added to a list of 'Kremlin mouthpieces' by the Center for Countering Disinformation of the National Security and Defense Council of Ukraine. In October 2025 Phillips threatened to physically assault a Donetsk TikToker for accidentally filming a Russian military installation, which was then destroyed, along with a Donetsk supermarket, by a Ukrainian military strike.

In November 2025 it was reported that in 2022 the Metropolitan Police had launched a war crimes investigation relating to multiple alleged breaches by Phillips of the Geneva Conventions, including during his interview with Aiden Aslin. The most widely reported allegation concerned a video report from 2022 which featured pigs devouring the remains of dead Ukrainian soldiers and Phillips' quips while this was happening, which was said to violate international law protections for the dignity of the dead. Phillips responded by saying "Why should I have intervened in that incident with the pigs?... I could say it was pigs eating pigs, but that would be an insult to the pigs". He said he had not been contacted by the police. In December 2025 the BBC released a 4-part podcast about Phillips and Aslin, called Two Nottingham Lads.

In March 2026, the European Union imposed sanctions on Phillips for "creating propaganda materials in the temporarily occupied territories of Ukraine and publishing articles in support of the Kremlin's actions". Phillips responded by referencing the character "Brick Top" from the film Snatch, who he has accused the media of attempting to portray him as. Phillips was described by Euronews as continuing to be active posting videos from Russian-occupied territories, notably Mariupol. In sanctioning Phillips, the EU noted that he continues to refer to the Ukrainian Government as "Nazis", and accused Ukraine of the indiscriminate shelling of civilian areas of Donbas.

In July 2026 after Russia gained control of parts of Kostiantynivka, Phillips told Russian media that he had filmed reports there in 2014, and most people there had supported breaking away from Ukraine. He spoke supportively of Russia having captured the settlement. In August 2026 Phillips was criticised again for him continuing to "promote the Kremlin narrative". In September 2026, Kremlin spokesperson Maria Zakharova included Phillips in a list of non-Russian journalist she stated were being persecuted for showing a point of view different to that of the West. In September it was also reported that despite his being sanctioned, with his bank account frozen, living in Mariupol, Phillips is still being pursued for unpaid council tax on his London home which he states he is unable to pay due to being sanctioned and 'destitute'.

=== Awards ===
Phillips has been awarded multiple medals both by the Donbas republics and by Russia:

- March 2015 – Russia - Medal "Border Brotherhood", Chekhov near Moscow, on behalf of the Border Service.
- December 2015 – Medal "For Merit", 2nd Grade, Luhansk, awarded by then head of the Luhansk People's Republic, Igor Plotnitsky.
- September 2016 – Medal by order of the Minister of the Ministry of Internal Affairs of the LPR, No. 273, "For Assisting the Internal Affairs", Luhansk.
- November 2020 – Medal «Военкор» 'War Correspondent', Moscow. Others to receive this award included Alexander Sladkov, and Alexander Kots.

== Personal life ==
Phillips lived in London before Russia's 2022 invasion of Ukraine, and now lives in Russian-occupied Mariupol. He is a fan of British cars, and is often seen driving a Rover 75, Jaguar or Range Rover. Phillips is known for often wearing Fred Perry clothing. He has named Shed Seven and Gene among his favourite bands. Phillips has a daughter in the UK.

== See also ==
- Eva Bartlett – Canadian activist and blogger
- Jackson Hinkle – American political commentator
- Patrick Lancaster – American vlogger
- Gonzalo Lira – Chilean–American YouTuber
- Scott Ritter – American author and commentator
- Russian information war against Ukraine
- Sonja van den Ende – Dutch blogger and political activist
