= DeWereldMorgen =

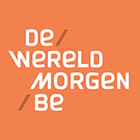
- Logo of DeWereldMorgen
- Format: Online
- Founded: March 2010
- Language: Dutch
- Headquarters: Van Arteveldestraat 17, 2060 Antwerp, Belgium
- Website: DeWereldMorgen.be

DeWereldMorgen is a free Belgian Dutch-language alternative media website, started in March 2010 as a joint initiative of the Belgian Dutch-language globalization website Pala.be and the Belgian section of the Independent Media Center. It is operated by a core of professional journalists and receives contributions from about 300 volunteers annually. DeWereldMorgen‘s total revenue in 2010 was €366,707.28, but nevertheless made a loss of €9,000 (most expenses go to personnel costs, and rent of buildings and rooms). The core editorial team is paid a monthly salary.

All of the content of De Wereld Morgen is published under Creative Commons license type CC BY-NC-ND 2.0 BE.

== Alternative ==
Kaat Van Damme's master thesis claims that DeWereldMorgen can be defined as an alternative media website with regard to content, editing, and the business model. Among Belgian media, DeWereldMorgen, Apache.be and Mondiaal Nieuws are often considered to be the main alternative news media. It is characterized by politicization.

== Content ==
The website states that it seeks to be independent of large media organizations and feature the voices of non-governmental organizations and social movements. It also works together with similar partners such as StampMedia and rekto:verso. It can be characterized as preferring to be correct, rather than neutral.

The news site takes a pro-Palestinian stance in the Israeli–Palestinian conflict, according to De Standaard.

In relation to climate change, Yves Pepermans characterized DeWereldMorgen as coming "closest to a democratic arena" (compared with other Belgian newspapers De Standaard and De Morgen); and has claimed it criticizes the role of markets and stakeholders in relation to climate change, and that it advocates for larger public control over the economy for a socially just outcome for climate change. However, its addition to the debate is one-sided, and the media outlet has few readers.

== Editing ==
Other than traditional media, there is less contrast between the professional journalist and the reader. Reactions can be posted even anonymously, and can only rarely be removed. Furthermore, DeWereldMorgen encourages readers to contribute content via the site's "Community" section. Even though everybody can create new articles in the "Community", DeWereldMorgen is critical of the model of gatewatching: instead, a professional team of editors selects articles for promotion to the front page. DeWereldMorgen also tries to inform its readers about changes within the website.

== Business model ==
Because DeWereldMorgen presents oneself as a "movement for media and democracy", they receive subsidies; without which they would have serious financial troubles. Other than these subsidies, it is mostly dependent on financial partners, which can create a bias against publishing any articles criticizing those partners. Micropayments, book sales, donations and lectures generate a smaller part of its revenue. In 2010, €32,110.97 was donated to DeWereldMorgen, possibly by people who cancel their paid subscription to another newspaper. DeWereldMorgen is sponsored by trade unions.

60% of the total revenue for 2010 was received via subsidies, some of which stem from the European Union and from different departments of the Flemish Community, such as the Department of Popular Education (Dutch: Afdeling volksontwikkeling). While DeWereldMorgen thinks it receives far too few subsidies in comparison to other media, an extreme-right nationalist website called "REACT" (where Vlaams Belang, Voorpost and nl:Vlaamse Solidaire Vakbond advertise) criticizes the website and its subsidies in denigrating language.

== Scholarly interest ==
A master thesis has analysed the platform in relation to Apache.be (another Belgian Dutch-language alternative media website) in 2010, and a post-doctoral linguist analyses it with regards to the Belgian newspaper De Morgen. It has been contrasted with newspapers De Standaard and De Morgen in a 2015 PhD thesis; in relation to politicization of climate change, and it has been subjected to a case-study of "positionality" and "the environmental justice frame".
