= Eva Bartlett =

Canadian activist and blogger

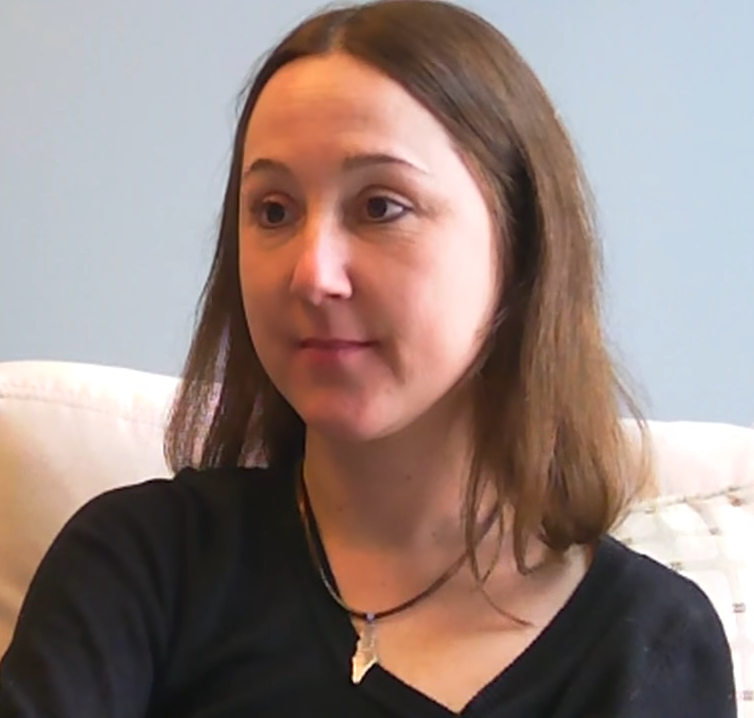
- Bartlett in 2014
- Born: 14 June 1977 (age 49); United States
- Citizenship: United States; Canada
- Occupations: Activist; commentator; blogger
- Known for: Promotion of conspiracy theories connected to the Syrian civil war

Eva Karene Bartlett (born 14 June 1977) is an American and Canadian activist, commentator, and blogger who has propagated conspiracy theories in connection to the Syrian civil war, most notably the disproven allegation that the White Helmets stage rescues and "recycle" children in its videos.

Bartlett describes herself as an "independent writer and rights activist". She writes commentary pieces for Russian state-controlled RT's website. (Note: Bartlett's articles are published in the website's section styled Op-ed (previously Op-edge).) Critics contend that her advocacy amounts to participation in a disinformation campaign aimed at lessening the responsibility of the Assad regime for the acts of indiscriminate killing during the war, and to promote pro-Kremlin content in relation to the Russian invasion of Ukraine.

Bartlett has lived in Russia since 2019. She has been making videos and posts on social media from Ukraine during the Russian invasion, sometimes with journalists from RT. She often appears as a guest on RT. She has been criticised for spreading Kremlin propaganda and misinformation. Bartlett's posts on social media have been tagged with the disclaimer that her writings "may be partially or wholly under the editorial control of the Russian government".

== Early life and education ==
Bartlett was born in the United States and grew up in Canada. She taught English in South Korea after finishing university.

== Career ==
From 2008, Bartlett was a pro-Palestinian campaigner with the International Solidarity Movement, making trips to Gaza, reporting and commenting on her blog, and going on speaking tours in North America. Since then, she has commented on the Syrian civil war, and has travelled to Syria six times prior to 2017.

=== Syrian civil war viral disinformation video ===
In late 2016, Bartlett generated controversy over a video on a Russian-funded web channel that went viral, in which she said that Syrians "overwhelmingly support" Bashar al-Assad, as evidenced by the results of the 2014 election, an election widely denounced, e.g. by the European Union, as an illegitimate sham.

She has characterized the White Helmets as being part of a Western propaganda campaign, alleging that rescues by that organization are hoaxes whereby they "recycle" the same children in footage of staged rescues, and that "no one in eastern Aleppo has heard of [the White Helmets]". In the same video, Bartlett falsely claimed that the al-Quds Hospital bombing in April 2016, where 55 died, never occurred, saying it was rebel propaganda. Bartlett's claims were amplified by Russian-controlled outlets such as RT, Sputnik News and In The Now. The claims were found to be false by Channel 4 News and Snopes. The broader "same girl" internet meme has been categorized as a derivation of the "crisis actor" conspiracy theories. The video presented Bartlett as an independent journalist speaking to the United Nations when in fact the event was staged by the Syrian government.

In 2017, Bartlett was rebuked by The Syria Campaign, an advocacy group that campaigns on behalf of the White Helmets. Relying on research done by the social media intelligence company Graphika, it released a report alleging a Russian disinformation campaign in the Syrian Civil War, according to which Bartlett was part of a network seeking to discredit the White Helmets in order to minimise war crimes committed by the Assad regime. According to the publication, YouTube had removed several videos of Bartlett because they were on "accounts linked to Russian disinformation". An equal characterization of Bartlett's activity has been made in a 2017 report on the situation in Aleppo, by the American think-tank Atlantic Council.

According to Janine di Giovanni in The New York Review of Books, Bartlett is a core member of a group of "Assad’s Western apologists", alongside Vanessa Beeley, Sharmine Narwani, and Max Blumenthal; their work is disseminated by a "spectrum of far-left, anti-West conspiracy theorists; anti-Semites; supporters of Russia, Iran, and Hezbollah; libertarians; and far-right groups".

Research by the Institute for Strategic Dialogue in 2022 identified Bartlett as a member of a network of social media accounts, individuals, outlets and organisations who disseminated disinformation about the Syria conflict, noting that one video featuring her had been viewed 4.5 million times on Facebook. Coda Story noted that by March 2022 the different versions of the video had been viewed 10 million times.

=== North Korea trip ===
Bartlett went to North Korea in 2017 alongside Tim Anderson, and said that western media coverage of the country is aimed to "detract from America’s past and current crimes against the Korean people, and to garner support for yet another American-led slaughter of innocent people". HuffPost described Bartlett and Anderson's trip as "regime-sponsored".

=== Ukraine ===
In 2022, Bartlett spent time in Ukraine, reporting on the Russian invasion of Ukraine from a pro-Russian perspective, sometimes with journalists from Russian state-owned channel Russia Today. The Institute for Strategic Dialogue (ISD) identified her as one of the twelve key Western influencers spreading pro-Kremlin disinformation about the Russo-Ukrainian War. Bartlett is not directly employed by RT, although she has regularly written op-eds on RT's website, makes videos with RT correspondents and shares RT content. Facebook has labeled her posts with a disclaimer that she “may be partially or wholly under the editorial control of the Russian government.” In July 2022, she was a speaker at the Russian-organised International Public Tribunal on Ukraine in Moscow, which aimed to "collect data and prove the commission of war crimes by the Kyiv regime".

== See also ==
- Vanessa Beeley, British journalist, activist
- Patrick Lancaster, American vlogger
- Gonzalo Lira, Chilean-American YouTuber
- Graham Phillips, British journalist
- Scott Ritter, American author, and commentator
- Margarita Simonyan, Russian media executive
- Russian information war against Ukraine
- Collaboration with Russia during the Russian invasion of Ukraine
