= Patrick Lancaster =

American YouTuber

- Born: Missouri, United States
- Occupation: Vlogger

YouTube information
- Channel: PatrickLancasterNewsToday
- Years active: 2014–present
- Genres: Vlogs; Documentary
- Subscribers: 902 thousand
- Views: 113 million
- Last updated: July 2026

Patrick Lancaster is an American vlogger, described as a US Military veteran being used by Russia to help spread Russian propaganda about the Russian invasion of Ukraine. Lancaster has also been widely accused of filming staged scenes in his YouTube videos and spreading disinformation.

== Biography ==
=== Early life and US Navy ===
Lancaster is originally from Missouri in the United States of America. From 2001 to 2006 he was a sailor in the US Navy specializing as a cryptologic technician and rising to the rank of petty officer third class. He sailed on the USS Kitty Hawk (CV-63) from 2002 to 2006.

=== Ukraine and Russia ===
==== 2014–2021 ====
Lancaster arrived in Ukraine in March 2014 to cover the aftermath of the Maidan revolution, settling in Donetsk later that year. From 2015 on, Lancaster has primarily created videos for his own YouTube channel.

==== MH17 ====
Lancaster has produced videos in which he describes finding skeletal remains from Malaysia Airlines Flight 17, and has claimed the flight was shot down by Ukrainian forces. MH17 victims' families have criticized Lancaster's lack of regard for their loved ones' remains, and Dutch media has accused him of exploiting the tragedy.

==== Russo-Ukrainian war ====
Lancaster has vlogged mostly from Russian-controlled territories of Ukraine since 2022, in the early days of the 2022 Russian invasion of Ukraine, Vice Media and NBC News described him as the most popular of the pro-Kremlin influencers spreading Russian propaganda and disinformation on YouTube. Investigative journalism agency Bellingcat has reported that Lancaster's videos have exposed a staged Russian IED attack, and revealed the identity of a Russian perpetrator of a war crime. In 2024, Lancaster's videos from Russia's Kursk region in the context of Ukraine's Kursk campaign showed local residents speaking positively about the Ukrainian army.

In late April 2025, Lancaster gave an interview to Tucker Carlson where he dismissed claims of North Korean troops in Russia, stating that he had not found them "not for the lack of trying". In September 2025, the ruling pro-Russian party in Georgia banned Lancaster from entering the country.

=== Nagorno-Karabakh conflict ===
Over the years, Lancaster has sporadically created videos on the Nagorno-Karabakh conflict for his YouTube channel. Lancaster has been accused of producing fake news and staged videos on the conflict.

== See also ==
- Eva Bartlett – Canadian pro-Russia activist
- Russell Bentley – American fighter and vlogger
- Jackson Hinkle – American political commentator
- Alex Jones – American conspiracy theorist
- Gonzalo Lira – Chilean-American YouTuber
- Graham Phillips – British journalist
- Scott Ritter – American pro-Russian political commentator
- Russian information war against Ukraine
