= Gonzalo Lira =

Chilean-American novelist, filmmaker and blogger (1968–2024)

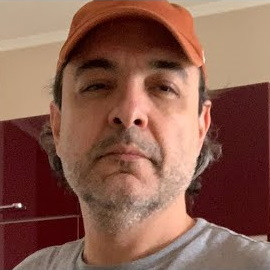
- Lira in March 2022
- Born: Gonzalo Ángel Quintilio Lira López; February 29, 1968; Burbank, California, U.S.
- Died: January 12, 2024 (aged 55); Ukraine
- Other name: Coach Red Pill
- Education: Dartmouth College
- Occupations: Novelist; Commentator
- Movement: Manosphere, Russophilia, Pinochetism

Gonzalo Ángel Quintilio Lira López ([ɣonˈsalo ˈaŋxel kinˈtiljo ˈlira ˈlopes], February 29, 1968 – January 12, 2024) was a Chilean-American, at various times in his life novelist, screenwriter, filmmaker, self-styled dating coach, YouTuber, political commentator, blogger and vlogger. At one point in his career as a novelist, Lira was described as the "highest-paid Chilean writer in the world". Lira would later become involved in the manosphere, posting anti-feminist content under the name Coach Red Pill.

By the time of the Russian invasion of Ukraine in early 2022, Lira had been living in Ukraine for years, and as a resident of Kharkiv, Lira started vlogging about the Russian invasion, soon being described by Ukrainian officials and Western researchers and media as spreading Russian disinformation and propaganda.

In April 2022, Lira disappeared briefly in Ukraine, stating upon his release he had been detained by the Security Service of Ukraine (SBU). In May 2023, Lira was again arrested by the SBU, and this time charged with "producing and publishing material that tried to justify the ongoing Russian invasion", something illegal under Ukrainian law. Lira was released on bail and subsequently tried to flee the country. He was arrested again for violating his bail conditions, and died of pneumonia in custody on January 12, 2024.

== Early life ==
Lira was born to Chilean parents in Burbank, California, and grew up in the San Fernando Valley of Los Angeles; Guayaquil, Ecuador; and Santiago, Chile, among other places. He graduated from Saint George's College, Santiago in 1985. From 1985 until 1991, he worked as an English teacher and traveled in South America. He entered Dartmouth College in 1991, graduating in 1995 with a bachelor's degree in history and philosophy.

== Career ==
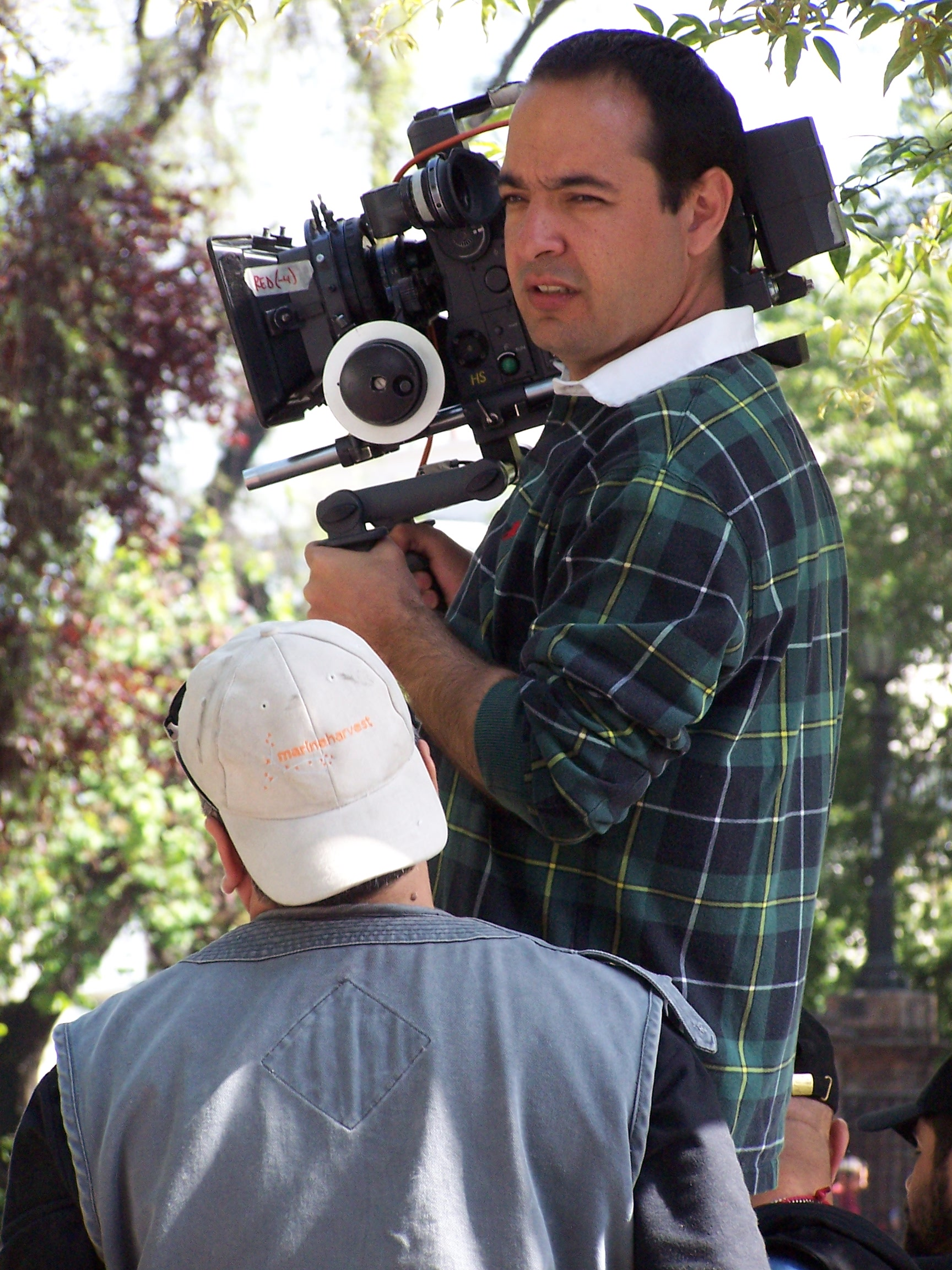
Lira while filming Secuestro

After graduating, Lira moved to Los Angeles to pursue a career as a screenwriter. When that was unsuccessful, he turned to writing novels. In 1997, Lira released a Spanish-language coming-of-age novel, Tomáh Errázurih. Lira's first English-language novel, a spy thriller called Counterparts, was published in January 1998 by G. P. Putnam's Sons. Lira received an advance of one million U.S. dollars for the novel and a follow-up, upon which he was referred to by Qué Pasa magazine as the "highest-paid Chilean writer in the world".

In 1998, after moving to New York City, Lira wrote, produced, and directed a short comedy film, So Kinky. He was also involved in the story creation of the 2000 video game Soldier of Fortune. Lira published a second English-language book, another spy thriller titled Acrobat, in 2002, the movie rights to which were bought by Miramax. In 2005, he filmed Secuestro in Chile, which came in second in the box office in Chile following its opening weekend.

From 2010 to 2013, Lira published his thoughts on economics and other subjects on his personal blog, some of which were reposted by Business Insider, though a majority of his articles have since been removed. He also contributed to Zero Hedge, a far-right financial and geopolitics website. During this period, Lira contacted Australian economist Steve Keen, proposing a collaborative project and suggesting that they start a paid subscription website. According to Keen, Gonzalo "overstated and over-promised what he could do".

In 2017, Lira became an active YouTuber, initially under the pseudonym Coach Red Pill (CRP), an allusion to Red Pill and Black Pill symbolism in the manosphere community. The content was misogynistic and anti-feminist in nature. Lira posted videos with advice such as "never date a woman in her thirties" and argued that all women wanted was money, a house, and kids, as only child-rearing would biologically validate them. In one video, he advised viewers living in Western democracies to move to "a poor, underdeveloped country" due to the former's supposed "totalitarian" deployment of COVID-19 vaccines. In November 2021, Lira deleted most of his CRP content and began posting under his legal name. He was also a declared Pinochetist, making videos and publications on social media in this regard.

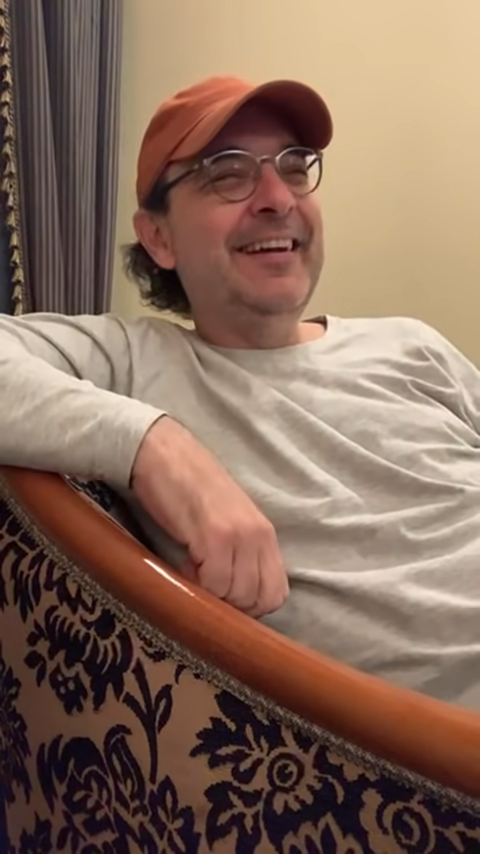
Lira in February 2022, at the beginning of the Russian invasion of Ukraine.

By the time of the Russian invasion in February 2022, Lira had been living in Ukraine for years. He shifted the majority of his commentary to the war. Lira's heavily pro-Russian content praised Russian military actions, denied Russian attacks on civilians, and doxxed Western journalists. His content, which has been described as Russian propaganda and disinformation, was amplified on social media by Kremlin-linked accounts and praised by Russian Foreign Ministry spokeswoman Maria Zakharova.

Lira lived in Kharkiv, and married a Ukrainian woman with whom he had two children, though the pair later separated.

== Arrest and prosecution ==
On April 15, 2022, friends and family of Lira said that they had lost touch with him, after which Chile's Ministry of Foreign Affairs began searching for his whereabouts. American spokesperson for Ukraine's Territorial Defence Forces Sarah Ashton-Cirillo reported Lira's apparent capture by Ukrainian forces on April 18. Lira became the subject of conspiracy theories surrounding his alleged murder; however he resurfaced alive on April 22, 2022, stating that he had been detained by the SBU for the period he was missing.

On May 1, 2023, Lira was arrested for violating Article 436-2 of Ukraine's criminal code, which prohibits justification of Russia's ongoing invasion of the country. The Ukrainian Centre for Strategic Communication and Information Security said that Lira had shared video footage of himself insulting Ukrainian soldiers and spread pro-Russian disinformation, such as claiming the Bucha massacre was faked or that the Ukrainian government was a Neo-Nazi regime. His arrest was reported by the SBU on May 5. Lira was subsequently released on bail and placed under house arrest. He returned to social media stating he had been tortured while imprisoned, an allegation denied by the SBU. Lira attempted to flee the country by crossing the Hungarian border on July 31 to claim political asylum, but was captured and arrested again for violating his bail conditions.

In December 2023, Elon Musk, CEO of X (formerly Twitter), publicly inquired about Lira on his platform, in response to a post by media personality Tucker Carlson calling Lira a political prisoner. The SBU responded that Lira had been detained in accordance with the law. Musk's post was also labeled with a Community Note explaining the nature of Lira's charges, after which Musk said that the note had been "gamed by state actors". In a Business Insider interview that month, American spokesperson for Ukraine's Territorial Defence Forces Sarah Ashton-Cirillo asserted that Lira had fabricated his torture accusations in an effort to gain sympathy.

== Death ==
On January 12, 2024, Gonzalo Lira Sr., Lira's father, reported that his son had died in a Ukrainian prison at the age of 55. This was then confirmed by the United States Department of State and Chile's Ministry of Foreign Affairs. His cause of death was reported to be pneumonia. In a letter, Lira had written of having pneumonia and other health issues, which he said had been ignored by the prison.

Lira Sr. said his son was a victim of torture, and blamed Ukrainian President Volodymyr Zelenskyy and United States President Joe Biden for causing his son's death. Russian officials, including Maria Zakharova and Foreign Minister Sergey Lavrov, repeated this claim, as did some Western political figures. Cathy Young of The Bulwark criticized anti-Ukraine commentators for spreading misinformation about Lira and exploiting his death, and also issued a call for transparency. His body was sent to Santiago, Chile via Europe.

In August 2025, the US Department of State referred to his case on the 2024 Report on Human Rights practices in Ukraine, stating that Lira "died of illness that could have resulted from neglect or improper treatment".

== Filmography ==
- So Kinky (1998) – writer, director.
- Secuestro (2005) aka Catalina's Kidnapping – co-writer, co-producer, director.

== Publications ==
- Lira, Gonzalo (1997). Tomáh Errázurih (1 ed.). Santiago de Chile: Mondadori. ISBN 956-258-057-1. OCLC 38081261.
- Lira, Gonzalo (1998). Counterparts. New York: G.P. Putnam's Sons. ISBN 0-399-14312-2. OCLC 37300650.
- Lira, Gonzalo (2002). Acrobat (1 ed.). New York: St. Martin's Press. ISBN 0-312-28694-5. OCLC 48515857.

== See also ==
- Collaboration with Russia during the Russian invasion of Ukraine
- Eva Bartlett – Canadian activist, journalist
- Russell Bentley – American fighter, activist, blogger
- Jackson Hinkle – American political commentator
- Patrick Lancaster – American vlogger
- Graham Phillips – British journalist
- Scott Ritter – pro-Russian American pundit
- Russian information war against Ukraine
- Wartime collaboration
