= Völkisch movement =

German ethnic nationalist movement

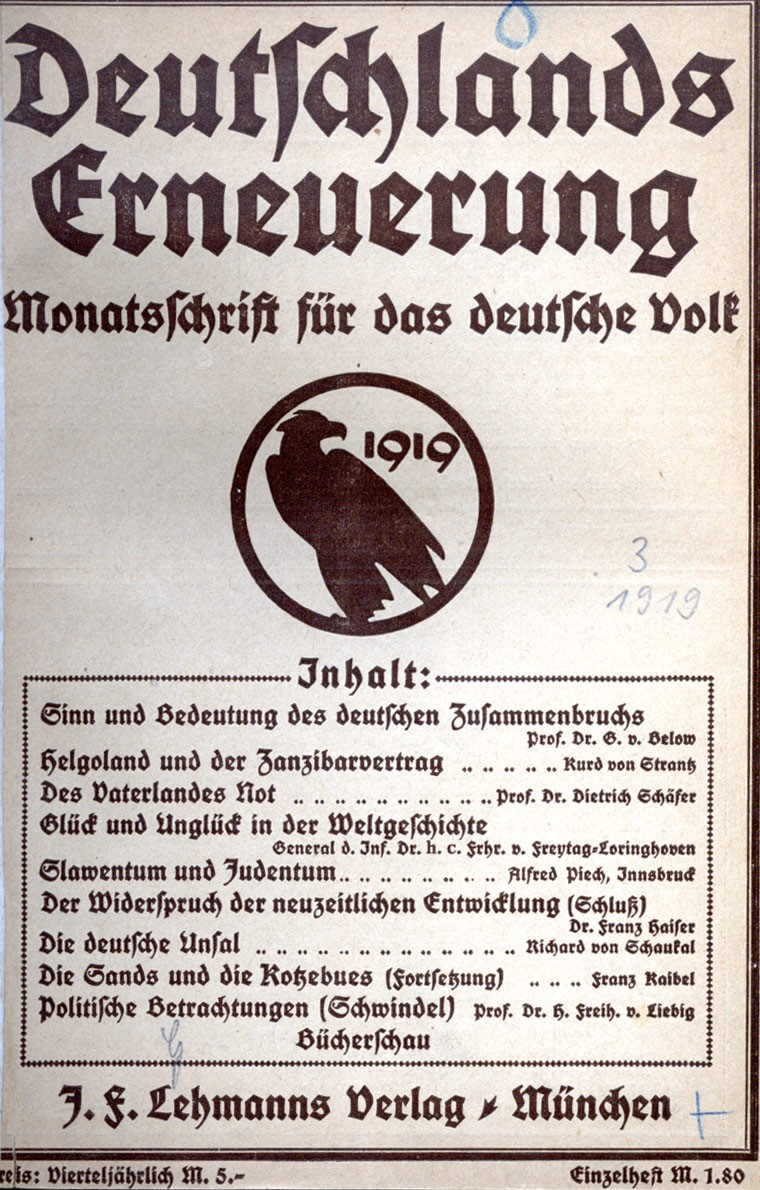
Magazine advocating for Völkisch politics (1919)

The Völkisch movement (German: Völkische Bewegung [ˌfœlkɪʃə bəˈveːɡʊŋ], English: Folkist movement, also called Völkism) was a Pan-German ethno-nationalist movement active from the late 19th century through the dissolution of Nazi Germany in 1945, with remnants in the Federal Republic of Germany afterwards. Erected on the idea of "blood and soil", inspired by the one-body-metaphor (Volkskörper, "ethnic body"; literally "body of the people"), and by the idea of naturally grown communities in unity, it was characterized by organicism, racialism, populism, agrarianism, romantic nationalism and – as a consequence of a growing exclusive and ethnic connotation – by antisemitism from the 1900s onward. Völkisch nationalists generally considered the Jews to be an "alien people" who belonged to a different Volk ("race" or "folk") from the Germans. After World War II, the Völkisch movement became viewed as a proto-fascist or proto-Nazi phenomenon in the context of German society.

The Völkisch movement was a "variegated sub-culture" that rose in opposition to the socio-cultural changes of modernity. The "only denominator common" to all Völkisch theorists was the idea of national rebirth, inspired by the traditions of the Ancient Germans, which the movement's adherents had "reconstructed" on a romantic basis. This proposed rebirth entailed either "Germanizing" Christianity or comprehensively rejecting Christian heritage in favour of a reconstituted pre-Christian Germanic paganism. In a narrow sense, the term designates only groups that consider human beings essentially preformed by blood or inherited characteristics.

Scholars often place the Völkischen within a broader conservative revolution, a German national conservative movement that rose in prominence during the Weimar Republic (1918–1933). During the period of Nazi Germany, Adolf Hitler and the Nazis believed in and enforced a definition of the German Volk which excluded Jews, the Romani people, Jehovah's Witnesses, homosexuals, and other "foreign elements" living in Germany. Their policies led to these "undesirables" being rounded up and murdered in large numbers, in what became known as the Holocaust.

== Translation ==
The adjective Völkisch (pronounced [ˈfœlkɪʃ]) derives from the German word Volk (cognate with the English "folk"), which carries overtones of "nation", "race" or "tribe". While Völkisch has no direct English equivalent, it could be loosely translated as "ethno-nationalist", "ethnic-chauvinist", "ethnic-popular", or, closer to its original meaning, as "bio-mystical racialist".

If Völkisch writers used terms like Nordische Rasse ("Nordic race") and Germanentum ("Germanic peoples"), their concept of Volk could, however, also be more flexible, and understood as a Gemeinsame Sprache ("common language"), or as an Ausdruck einer Landschaftsseele ("expression of a landscape's soul"), in the words of geographer Ewald Banse.

The defining idea around which the Völkisch movement revolved wasVolkstum, literally the "folkdom" or the "culture of the Volk". Other associated German words include Volksboden (the "Volk's essential substrate"), Volksgeist (the "spirit of the Volk"), Volksgemeinschaft (the "community of the Volk"), as well as Volkstümlich ("folksy" or "traditional") and Volkstümlichkeit (the "popular celebration of the Volkstum").

== Definition ==
The Völkisch movement was not unified; instead, according to Petteri Pietikäinen, it was "a cauldron of beliefs, fears and hopes that found expression in various movements and were often articulated in an emotional tone". According to historian Nicholas Goodrick-Clarke, Völkisch denoted the "national collectivity inspired by a common creative energy, feelings and sense of individuality. These metaphysical qualities were supposed to define the unique cultural essence of the German people." Journalist Peter Ross Range writes that "Völkisch is very hard to define and almost untranslatable into English. The word has been rendered as popular, populist, people's, racial, racist, ethnic-chauvinist, nationalistic, communitarian (for Germans only), conservative, traditional, Nordic, romantic – and it means, in fact, all of those. The völkisch political ideology ranged from a sense of German superiority to a spiritual resistance to 'the evils of industrialization and the atomization of modern man,' wrote military historian David Jablonsky. But its central component, said Harold J. Gordon, was always racism."

Völkisch thinkers tended to idealize the myth of an "original nation", that still could be found at that time in the rural regions of Germany, a form of "primitive democracy freely subjected to their natural elites." The notion of "people" (Volk) later became the idea of a "racial essence", and Völkisch thinkers treated the term as a birth-giving and quasi-eternal entity—as if it were "the Nature"—rather than a sociological category.

The movement combined sentimental patriotic interest in German folklore, local history and a "back-to-the-land" anti-urban populism. "In part this ideology was a revolt against modernity", Nicholls remarked. As they sought to overcome what they felt was the malaise of a scientistic and rationalistic modernity, Völkisch authors imagined a spiritual solution in a Volk's essence, perceived as authentic, intuitive, even "primitive", in the sense of alignment with a primordial and cosmic order.

== History ==
=== Origins in the 19th century ===
The Völkisch movement emerged in the late 19th century, drawing inspiration from German Romanticism and the history of the Holy Roman Empire, and what many saw as its harmonious hierarchical order. The delayed unification of the German-speaking peoples under a single German Reich in the 19th century is cited as conducive to the emergence of the Völkisch movement. The Volk were convinced that they were renouncing the ideals of the Enlightenment.

Despite the previous lower-class connotation associated to the word Volk, the Völkisch movement saw the term with a noble overtone suggesting a German ascendancy over other peoples. Thinkers led by Arthur de Gobineau (1816–1882), Georges Vacher de Lapouge (1854–1936), Houston Stewart Chamberlain (1855–1927), Ludwig Woltmann (1871–1907) and Alexis Carrel (1873–1944) were inspired by Charles Darwin's theory of evolution in advocating a "race struggle" and a hygienist vision of the world. They had conceptualized a racialist and hierarchical definition of the peoples of the world where Aryans (or Germans) had to be at the summit of the white race. The purity of the bio-mystical and primordial nation theorized by the Völkisch thinkers then began to be seen as having been corrupted by foreign elements, Jewish in particular.

=== Before World War I ===
Flag of the Order of the New Templars designed 1907 with a swastika used as völkisch (German ethno-nationalist) symbol

The same word Volk was used as a flag for new forms of ethnic nationalism, as well as by international socialist parties as a synonym for the proletariat in the German lands. From the left, elements of the folk-culture spread to the parties of the middle classes.

Although the primary interest of the Germanic mystical movement was the revival of native pagan traditions and customs (often set in the context of a quasi-theosophical esotericism), a marked preoccupation with purity of race came to motivate its more politically oriented offshoots, such as the Germanenorden (the Germanic or Teutonic Order), a secret society founded at Berlin in 1912 which required its candidates to prove that they had no "non-Aryan" bloodlines and required from each a promise to maintain purity of his stock in marriage. Local groups of the sect met to celebrate the summer solstice, an important neopagan festivity in völkisch circles (and later in Nazi Germany), and more regularly to read the Eddas as well as some of the German mystics.

Not all folkloric societies with connections to Romantic nationalism were located in Germany. The Völkisch movement was a force in Austria too. Meanwhile, the community of Monte Verità ('Mount Truth') which emerged in 1900 at Ascona, Switzerland is described by the Swiss art critic Harald Szeemann as "the southernmost outpost of a far-reaching Nordic lifestyle-reform, that is, alternative movement".

=== Weimar Republic ===
The political agitation and uncertainty that followed World War I nourished a fertile background for the renewed success of various Völkisch sects that were abundant in Berlin at the time, but if the Völkisch movement became significant by the number of groups during the Weimar Republic, they were not so by the number of adherents. A few Völkische authors tried to revive what they believed to be a true German faith (Deutschglaube), by resurrecting the cult of the ancient Germanic gods. Various occult movements such as ariosophy were connected to Völkisch theories, and artistic circles were largely present among the Völkischen, like the painters Ludwig Fahrenkrog (1867–1952) and Fidus (1868–1948). By May 1924, essayist Wilhelm Stapel perceived the movement as capable of embracing and reconciling the whole nation: in his view, Völkisch had an idea to spread instead of a party programme and were led by heroes — not by "calculating politicians". Scholar Petteri Pietikäinen also observed Völkisch influences on Carl Gustav Jung.

A major political vehicle for the Völkisch movement during this era was the German Völkisch Freedom Party (Deutschvölkische Freiheitspartei, DVFP), founded in December 1922 when key antisemitic figures split from the conservative German National People's Party. The DVFP openly called for a "völkisch dictatorship" and briefly formed a major electoral alliance with the banned National Socialist German Workers' Party (NSDAP) in 1924. Campaigning together as the National Socialist Freedom Movement, the alliance won 32 seats in the Reichstag, demonstrating that Völkisch ideology had a significant electoral presence independent of the early NSDAP.

== Influence on Nazism ==
The völkisch ideologies were influential in the development of Nazism. Indeed, Joseph Goebbels publicly asserted at the 1927 Nuremberg rally that if the populist (völkisch) movement had understood power and how to bring thousands out in the streets, it would have gained political power on 9 November 1918 (the outbreak of the SPD-led German Revolution of 1918–1919, end of the German monarchy). Nazi racial understanding was expressed in völkisch terms, as when Eugen Fischer delivered his inaugural address as Nazi rector, The Conception of the Völkisch state in the view of biology (29 July 1933). Karl Harrer, the Thule Society member most directly involved in the creation of the DAP in 1919, was sidelined at the end of the year when Hitler drafted regulations against conspiratorial circles, and the Thule Society was dissolved a few years later. The völkisch circles handed down one significant legacy to the Nazis: In 1919, Thule Society member Friedrich Krohn designed the original version of the Nazi swastika.

In January 1919, the Thule Society was instrumental in the foundation of the German Workers' Party (DAP), which later became the National Socialist German Workers' Party (NSDAP), commonly called the Nazi Party. Thule Society members or visiting guests of the Thule Society who would later join the Nazi Party included Rudolf Hess, Alfred Rosenberg, Hans Frank, Gottfried Feder, Dietrich Eckart and Karl Harrer. Notably, Adolf Hitler was never a member of the Thule Society and Rudolf Hess and Alfred Rosenberg were only visiting guests of the Thule Society in the early years before they came to prominence in the Nazi movement. After being appointed Chairman of the NSDAP in 1921, Hitler moved to sever the party's link with the Thule Society, expelling Harrer in the process; the Society subsequently fell into decline and was dissolved in 1925.

== Post-war legacy ==
Material from the major völkisch writers such as Herman Wirth, Wilhelm Teudt and Bernhard Kummer has continued to appear in some post-war groups in German-speaking Europe, notably occult and modern pagan far-right groups, such as Artgemeinschaft, and green-alternative groups interested in völkisch theses about Germanic matriarchy and ecology. There have been some supporters of völkisch material among the European New Right. A few völkisch motifs have appeared among British and American modern pagans. The literary scholar Stefanie von Schnurbein argues that patterns reminiscent of völkisch thinking appear in some fantasy literature.

== See also ==
- Aryanism
- Atsızism
- Der Wehrwolf
- Ethnic groups in Europe
- German Christians (movement)
- Positive Christianity
- German nationalism
- Guido von List
- Jörg Lanz von Liebenfels
- Hungarian nationalism
- Ideology of the Committee of Union and Progress
- Kemalism (1934 Turkish Resettlement Law)
- Martial races theory
- Master race
- Mathilde Ludendorff
- Nazism and occultism
- Neo-Nazism
- Nordicism
- Pan-German League (Alldeutscher Verband)
- Pan-Slavism
- Pan-Turkism
- Turanism
- Hungarian Turanism
- Racial theory
- Religion in Nazi Germany
- Religious aspects of Nazism
- Religious views of Adolf Hitler
- Rodnovery
- Sociology of immigration
- Volksdeutsche
- Volkshalle
