= Conservative Revolution =

German national-conservative movement during the Weimar Republic (1918–1933)

The Conservative Revolution (German: Konservative Revolution), also known as the German neoconservative movement (neokonservative Bewegung), or new nationalism (neuer Nationalismus), was a German national-conservative and ultraconservative movement prominent in Germany and Austria between 1918 and 1933 (from the end of World War I up to the Nazi seizure of power).

Conservative revolutionaries were involved in a cultural counter-revolution and showed a wide range of diverging positions concerning the nature of the institutions Germany had to instate, labelled by historian Roger Woods the "conservative dilemma". Nonetheless, they were generally opposed to traditional Wilhelmine Christian conservatism, egalitarianism, liberalism and parliamentarian democracy as well as the cultural spirit of the bourgeoisie and modernity. Plunged into what historian Fritz Stern has named a deep "cultural despair", uprooted as they felt within the rationalism and scientism of the modern world, theorists of the Conservative Revolution drew inspiration from various elements of the 19th century, including Friedrich Nietzsche's contempt for Christian ethics, democracy and egalitarianism; the anti-modern and anti-rationalist tendencies of German Romanticism; the vision of an organic and naturally-organized folk community cultivated by the Völkisch movement; the Prussian tradition of militaristic and authoritarian nationalism; and their own experience of comradeship and irrational violence on the front lines of World War I.

The Conservative Revolution held an ambiguous relationship with Nazism from the 1920s to the early 1930s, which has led scholars to describe it as a form of "German pre-fascism" or "non-Nazi fascism". Although they share common roots in 19th-century anti-Enlightenment ideologies, the disparate movement cannot be easily confused with Nazism. Conservative Revolutionaries were not necessarily racialist as the movement cannot be reduced to its Völkisch component. Although they participated in preparing the German society to the rule of the Nazi Party with their antidemocratic and organicist theories, and did not really oppose their rise to power, Conservative Revolutionary writings did not have a decisive influence on Nazism, and the movement was brought to heel like the rest of the society when Adolf Hitler seized power in 1933, culminating in the assassination of prominent thinker Edgar Jung by the Nazis during the Night of the Long Knives in the following year. Many of them eventually rejected the antisemitic or the totalitarian nature of the Nazi regime, with the notable exception of Carl Schmitt and some others.

From the 1960–1970s onwards, the Conservative Revolution has largely influenced the European New Right, in particular the French Nouvelle Droite and the German Neue Rechte, and through them the contemporary European Identitarian movement.

== Name and definition ==
Although conservative essayists of the Weimar Republic like Arthur Moeller van den Bruck, Hugo von Hofmannsthal or Edgar Jung had already described their political project as a Konservative Revolution ("Conservative Revolution"), the name saw a revival after the 1949 doctoral thesis of Neue Rechte philosopher Armin Mohler on the movement. Molher's post-war ideological reconstruction of the "Conservative Revolution" has been widely criticized by scholars, but the validity of a redefined concept of "neo-conservative" or "new nationalist" movement active during the Weimar period (1918–1933), whose lifetime is sometimes extended to the years 1890s–1910s, and which differed in particular from the "old nationalism" of the 19th century, is now generally accepted in scholarship.

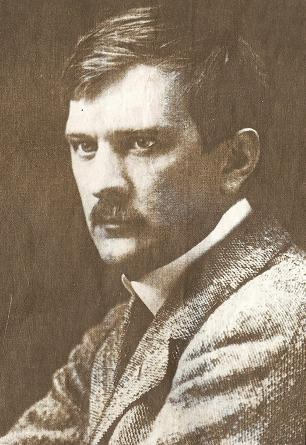
Undated portrait of Arthur Moeller van den Bruck

The name "Conservative Revolution" has appeared as a paradox, sometimes as a "semantic absurdity", for many modern historians, and some of them have suggested "neo-conservative" as a more easily justifiable label for the movement. Sociologist Stefan Breuer wrote that he would have preferred the substitute "new nationalism" to name a charismatic and holistic cultural movement that differed from the "old nationalism" of the previous century, whose essential role was limited to the preservation of the German institutions and their influence in the world. Despite the apparent contradiction, however, the association of the terms "Conservative" and "Revolution" is justified in Moeller van den Bruck's writings by his definition of the movement as a will to preserve eternal values while favouring at the same time the redesign of ideal and institutional forms in response to the "insecurities of the modern world".

Historian Louis Dupeux, a specialist of the Conservative Revolution, saw the movement as an intellectual project with its own consistent logic, namely the striving for an Intellektueller Macht ("intellectual power"), if necessary via the use of modern technique and concepts, which would allow them to promote and gain wider support to conservative and revolutionary ideas directed against liberalism, egalitarianism, and traditional conservatism. This change of attitude, compared to 19th-century conservatism, is described as a Bejahung ("affirmation") by Dupeux: Conservative Revolutionaries said "yes" to their time as long as they could find ways to facilitate the resurgence of anti-liberal and what they saw as "eternal values" within modern societies. Dupeux conceded at the same time that the Conservative Revolution was rather a counter-cultural movement than an actual philosophical proposition, relying more on non-rationalistic "feeling, images and myths" than on scientific analysis and concepts. He also admitted the necessity to distinguish several leanings, sometimes with contradictory views, within its diverse ideological spectrum.

[Conservative Revolutionaries] are, admittedly, as reactionary in politics as their pre-war predecessors, but they stand out by their optimism — or at least by their voluntarism — in front of the modern world. They do not really fear the masses, nor the technique anymore. Yet this change of Haltung ("attitude") had significant consequences — the backward-looking regret is replaced by a juvenile energy — and led to a wide-ranging political and cultural initiative.

— Louis Dupeux, 1994

Political scientist Tamir Bar-On has defined the Conservative Revolution as a combination of "German ultra-nationalism, defence of the organic folk community, technological modernity, and socialist revisionism, which perceived the worker and soldier as models for a reborn authoritarian state superseding the egalitarian "decadence" of liberalism, socialism, and traditional conservatism."

== Origin and development ==
The Conservative Revolution is encompassed in a larger and older counter-movement to the French Revolution of 1789, influenced by the anti-modernity and anti-rationalism of early 19th-century romanticism, in the context of a German, especially Prussian, "tradition of militaristic, authoritarian nationalism which rejected liberalism, socialism, democracy and internationalism." Historian Fritz Stern described the movement as disoriented intellectuals plunged into a profound "cultural despair": they felt alienated and uprooted within a world dominated by what they saw as "bourgeois rationalism and science". Their hatred of modernity, Stern follows, led them to the naive confidence that all these modern evils could be fought and resolved by a "Conservative Revolution".

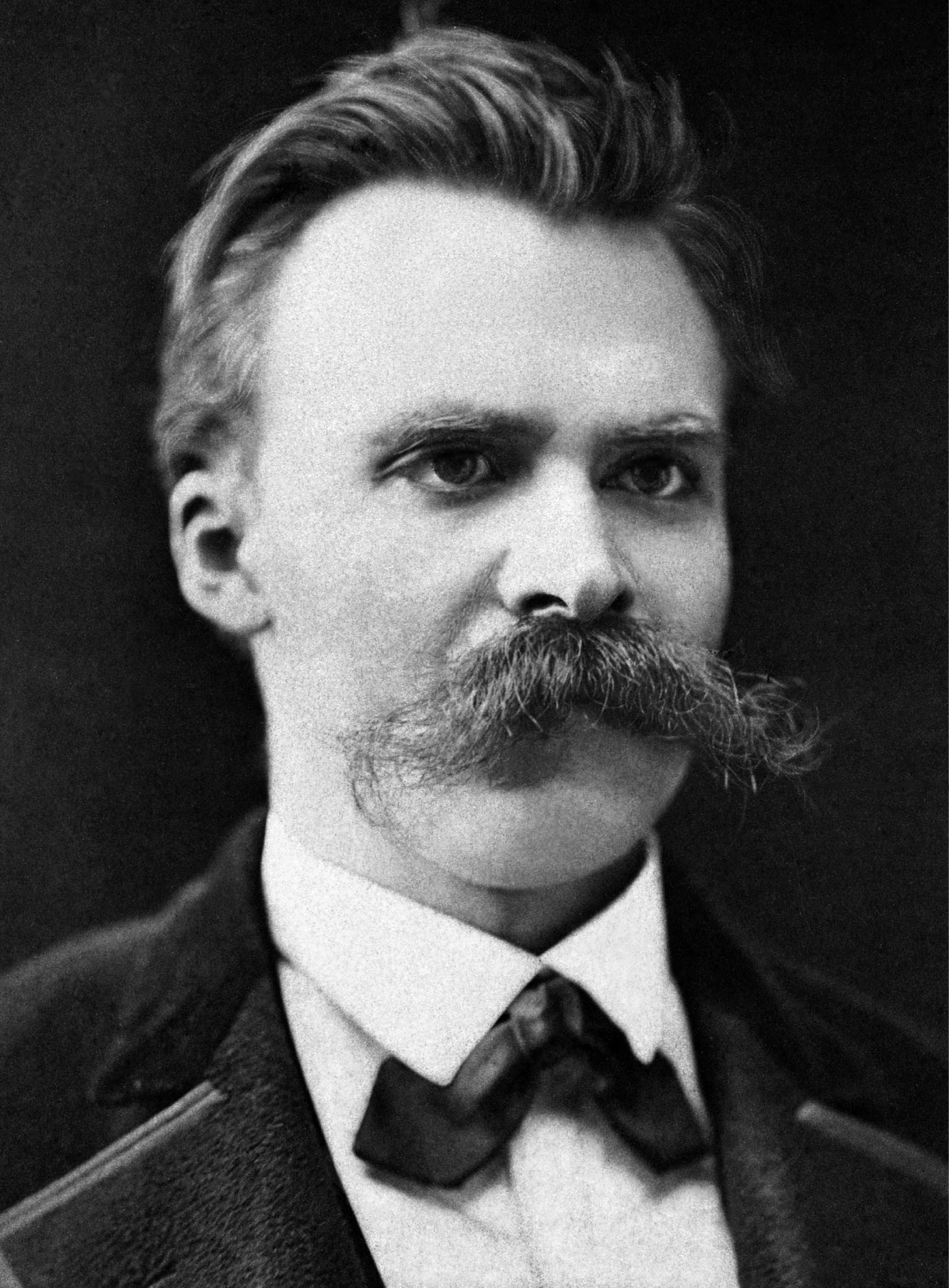
Many Conservative Revolutionaries cited Friedrich Nietzsche (c. 1875) as their mentor.

Although terms such as Konservative Kraft ("conservative power") and schöpferische Restauration ("creative restoration") began to spread across German-speaking Europe from the 1900s to the 1920s, (Note: Stefan Breuer has noted earlier appearances of the term outside of German-speaking Europe such as in Fyodor Dostoevsky's writings—who may have influenced Thomas Mann—and in Charles Maurras' works. For Konservative Kraft, see: Moeller van den Bruck (1910). "Konservative Kraft und moderne Idee", in: Der Tag v. 15. 6. For schöpferische Restauration, see: Melke Steiger. "Schöpferische Restauration" in: Zur politischen Romantik-Rezeption (Speech by Rudolf Borchardt in 1927).) the Konservative Revolution ("Conservative Revolution") became an established concept in the Weimar Republic (1918–1933) through the writings of essayists like Arthur Moeller van den Bruck, Hugo von Hofmannsthal, Hermann Rauschning, Edgar Jung and Oswald Spengler.

The creation of the Alldeutscher Verband ("Pan-German League") by Alfred Hugenberg in 1891 and the Jugendbewegung ("youth movement") in 1896 are cited as conducive to the emergence of the Conservative Revolution in the following decades. Moeller van den Bruck was the dominant figure of the movement until his suicide on 30 May 1925. His ideas were initially spread through the Juniklub he had founded on 28 June 1919, on the day of the signing of Treaty of Versailles.

Conservative Revolutionaries frequently referred to German philosopher Friedrich Nietzsche as their mentor and as the main intellectual influence on their movement. Despite Nietzsche's philosophy being often misinterpreted, or wrongly appropriated by thinkers of the Conservative Revolution, they retained his contempt for Christian ethics, democracy, modernity and egalitarianism as the cornerstone of their ideology. Historian Roger Woods writes that Conservative Revolutionaries "constructed", in response to the war and the unstable Weimar period, a Nietzsche "who advocated a self-justifying activism, unbridled self-assertion, war over peace, and the elevation of instinct over reason."

Many of the intellectuals involved in the movement were born in the last decades of the nineteenth century and experienced WWI as a formative event (Kriegserlebnis, "war experience") for the foundation of their political beliefs. The life on the front line, with its violence and irrationality, caused most of them to search a posteriori for a meaning to what they had to endure during the conflict. Ernst Jünger is the major figure of that branch of the Conservative Revolution which wanted to uphold military structures and values in peacetime society, and saw in the community of front line comradeship (Frontgemeinschaft) the true nature of German socialism.

== Main thinkers ==
According to Armin Mohler and other sources, prominent members of the Conservative Revolution included:

- Oswald Spengler
- Edgar Julius Jung
- Carl Schmitt
- Thomas Mann (until 1922);
- Ernst Jünger and his brother Friedrich Georg Jünger
- Arthur Moeller van den Bruck
- Stefan George
- Ernst Niekisch
- Martin Niemöller
- Wilhelm Stapel
- Hans Freyer
- Othmar Spann
- Hugo von Hofmannsthal and the Lensch-Cunow-Haenisch group
- Ernst von Salomon
- Ludwig Klages
- August Winnig
- Georg Quabbe
- Hans Zehrer
- Werner Sombart
- Hermann Rauschning
- Gottfried Reinhold Treviranus
- Julius Evola (Italian)
- Martin Heidegger
- Gottfried Benn
- Friedrich Hielscher
- Karl Haushofer
- Alfred Baeumler
- Paul Ernst
- Paul Lensch
- Mathilde Ludendorff
- Sigrid Hunke
- Jakob Wilhelm Hauer
- Hans Grimm
- Ernst Forsthoff
- Werner Best
- Hans Blüher

== Ideology ==
Despite a broad range of political positions that historian Roger Woods has labelled the "conservative dilemma", the German Conservative Revolution can be defined by its disapproval of:

- the traditional conservative values of the German Empire (1871–1918), including the egalitarian ethics of Christianity; and a rejection of the project of a restoration of the defunct Wilhelmine empire within its historical political and cultural structures,
- the political regime and commercialist culture of the Weimar Republic; and the parliamentary system and democracy in general, because the national community (Volksgemeinschaft) shall "transcend the conventional divisions of left and right",
- the class analysis of socialism; with the defence of an anti-Marxist "socialist revisionism"; labelled by Oswald Spengler the "socialism of the blood", it drew inspiration from the front line comradeship of World War I.

=== New nationalism and morality ===
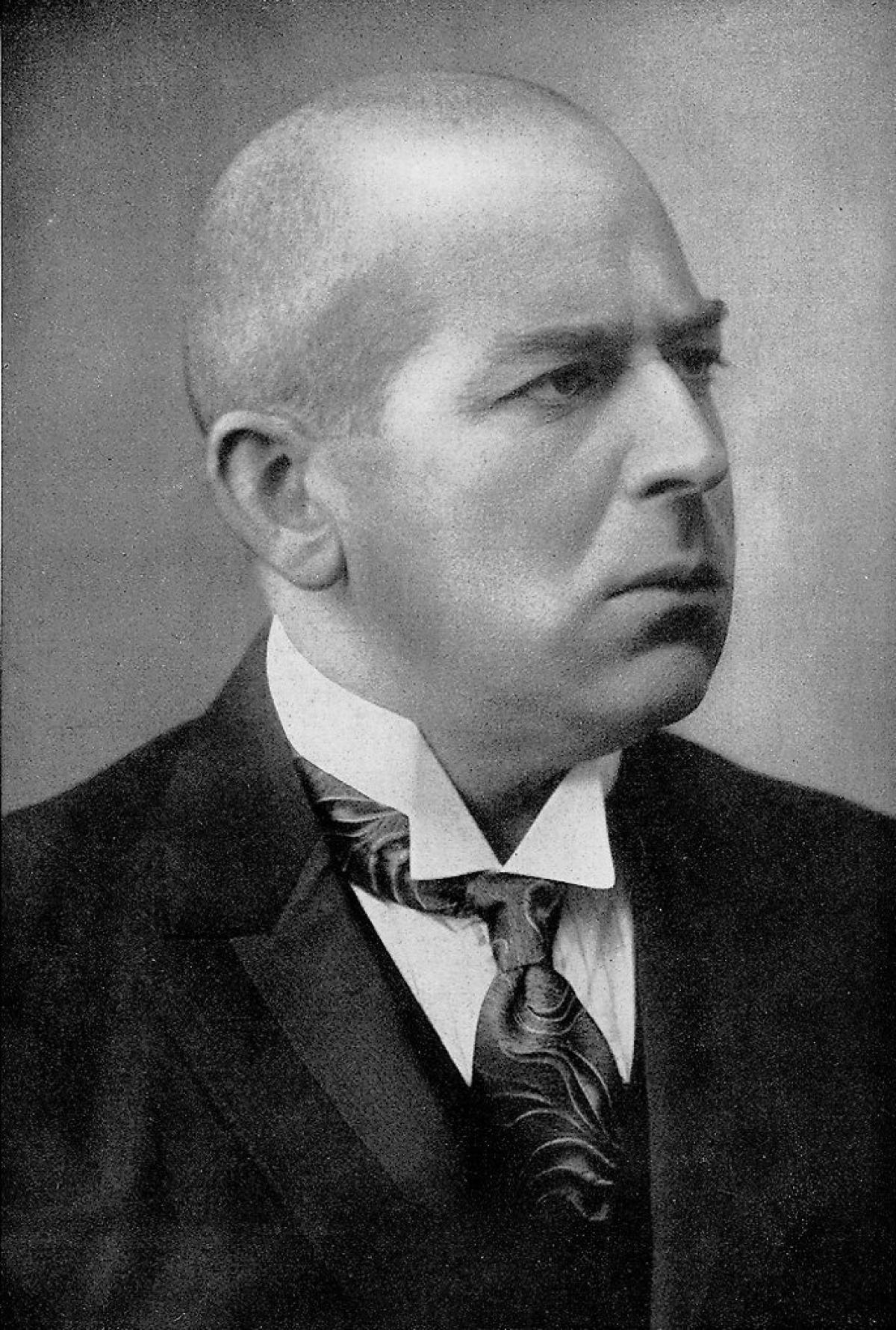
Oswald Spengler, author of The Decline of the West, embodied the Kulturpessimismus that partly characterised the Conservative Revolution.

Conservative Revolutionaries argued that their nationalism was fundamentally different from the precedent forms of German nationalism or conservatism. They condemned the reactionary outlook of traditional Wilhelmine conservatives and their failure to fully understand the emerging concepts of the modern world, such as technology, the city and the proletariat.

Moeller van den Bruck defined the Conservative Revolution as the will to conserve a set of values seen as inseparable from a Volk ("people, ethnic group"). These eternal values were able to survive through the fluctuations of the ages because of innovations in their institutional and ideal forms. Distant from the pure reactionary who, in Moeller van den Bruck's eyes, does not create (and from the pure revolutionary who does nothing but destroys everything), the Conservative Revolutionary sought to give a form to phenomena in an eternal space, a shape that could guarantee their survival among the few things that cannot be lost:

Conserving is not receiving to hand down, but rather innovating the forms, institutional or ideal, which agree to remain rooted in a solid world of values in the face of continuous historical setbacks. In the face of modernity as an era of insecurity, opposing the securities of the past is no longer enough; instead it is necessary to redesign new safety by adopting and taking on the same risky conditions with which it is defined.

— Arthur Moeller van den Bruck

Edgar Jung indeed dismissed the idea that true conservatives wanted to "stop the wheel of history". The chivalric way of life they were seeking to achieve was, according to Oswald Spengler, not governed by any moral code, but rather by "a noble, self-evident morality, based on that natural sense of tact which comes from good breeding". This morality was not the product of a conscious reflection, but rather "something innate which one senses and which has its own organic logic." Conservative revolutionaries saw the values of morality as instinctive and eternal, and as such embodied in rural life. The latter became challenged, Spengler believed, by the rise of the artificial world of the city, where theories and observations were needed to understand life itself, either coming from liberal democrats or scientific socialists. What Conservative Revolutionaries were aiming to achieve was the restoration, within the modern world, of what they saw as natural laws and values:

We call Conservative Revolution the restoration of all those elementary laws and values, without which man loses his connection with Nature and with God and cannot establish a true order.

— Edgar Jung, 1932

Influenced by Nietzsche, most of them were opposed to the Christian ethics of solidarity and equality. Although many Conservative Revolutionaries described themselves as Protestant or Catholics, they saw Christian ethical premise as structurally indenturing the strong into mandatory, rather than optional, service to the weak. On a geopolitical scale, theorists of the movement adopted a vision of the world (Weltanschauung) where nations would abandon moral standards in their relationship to each others, only guided by their natural self-interest.

Let thousands, nay millions, die; what meaning have these rivers of blood in comparison with a state, into which flow all the disquiet and longing of the German being!

— Friedrich Georg Jünger, 1926

Völkischen were involved in a racialist and occultist movement dating back to the middle of the 19th century and had an influence on the Conservative Revolution. Their priority was the fight against Christianity and the return to a (reconstructed) Germanic pagan faith, or the "Germanization" of Christianity to purge it from foreign (Semitic) influence.

=== Volksgemeinschaft and dictatorship ===
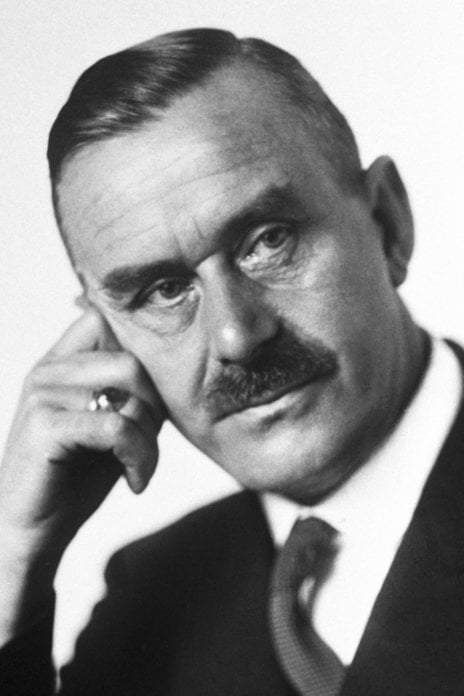
Thomas Mann, novelist and laureate of 1929 Nobel Prize, had been in his youth a vibrant opponent of democracy, although he later became one of the Weimar Republic's most prominent defenders.

Thomas Mann believed that if German military resistance to the West during World War I was stronger than its spiritual resistance, it was primarily because the ethos ("character") of the German Volksgemeinschaft ("national community") cannot quickly express itself in words, and as a result is not able to counter effectively the solid rhetoric of the West. Since German culture was "of the soul, something which could not be grasped by the intellect", the authoritarian state was the natural order desired by the German people. Politics, Mann argued, was inevitably a commitment to democracy and therefore alien to the German spirit:

There is no such thing as a democratic or a conservative politician. Either you are a politician or you are not, and if you are, you are a democrat.

— Thomas Mann, 1915

While scholars have debated whether these formulations should be considered artistic and idealistic, or rather a serious attempt to draw a political analysis of that period, young Mann's writings have been influential on many Conservative Revolutionaries. Mann was accused by the right of watering down his undemocratic views in 1922 after he removed some paragraphs from the republication of Betrachtungen eines Unpolitischen ("Reflections of a Nonpolitical Man"), originally released in 1918. In a speech delivered the same year ("On the German Republic" [Von deutscher Republik]), Mann publicly became a staunch defender of the Weimar Republic and attacked many of the figures associated with the Conservative Revolution such as Oswald Spengler, whom he depicted as intellectually dishonest and irresponsibly immoral. In 1933, he described National Socialism as the politische Wirklichkeit jener konservativen Revolution, that is to say the "political reality of that Conservative Revolution".

In 1921, Carl Schmitt published his essay Die Diktatur ("The Dictatorship"), in which he studied the foundations of the recently established Weimar Republic. Comparing what he saw as the effective and ineffective elements of the new constitution, he highlighted the office of the Reichspräsident as a valuable position, essentially due to the power granted to the president by the Article 48 to declare an Ausnahmezustand ("state of emergency"), which Schmitt implicitly praised as dictatorial.

If the constitution of a state is democratic, then every exceptional negation of democratic principles, every exercise of state power independent of the approval of the majority, can be called dictatorship.

— Carl Schmitt, 1921

Schmitt further advanced in Politische Theologie (1922) that there cannot be any functioning legal order without a sovereign authority. He defined sovereignty as the possibility, or the power, to decide on the triggering of a "state of emergency", in other words a state of exception regarding the law: "There is some person or institution, in a given polity, capable of bringing about a total suspension of the law and then to use extra-legal force to normalize the situation, then that person or institution is the sovereign in that polity." According to him, every government should include within its constitution that dictatorial possibility to allow, when necessary, for faster and more effective decisions than going through parliamentary discussion and compromise. Referring to Adolf Hitler, he later used in 1934 the following formulation to justify the legitimacy of the Night of the Long Knives: Der Führer schützt das Recht ("The leader defends the law").

=== Front-line socialism ===
Conservative Revolutionaries asserted that they were not guided by the "sterile resentment of the class struggle". Many of them invoked the community of front line comradeship (Frontgemeinschaft) of World War I as the model for the national community (Volksgemeinschaft) to follow in peaceful times, hoping in that project to transcend the established political categories of right and left. For that purpose, they tried to remove the concept of revolution from November 1918 in order to attach it to August 1914. Conservative Revolutionaries indeed painted the November Revolution, which led to the foundation of the Weimar Republic, as a betrayal of the true revolution and, at best, hunger protests by the mob.

The common agreement with socialists was the abolition of the excesses of capitalism. Jung claimed that, while the economy should remain in private hands, the "greed of capital" should at the same time be controlled, and that a community based on shared interests had to be set up between workers and employers. Another source of aversion for capitalism was rooted in the profits made from the war and inflation, and a last concern can be found in the fact that most of Conservative Revolutionaries belonged to the middle class, in which they felt crushed at the centre of an economic struggle between the ruling capitalists and the potentially dangerous masses.

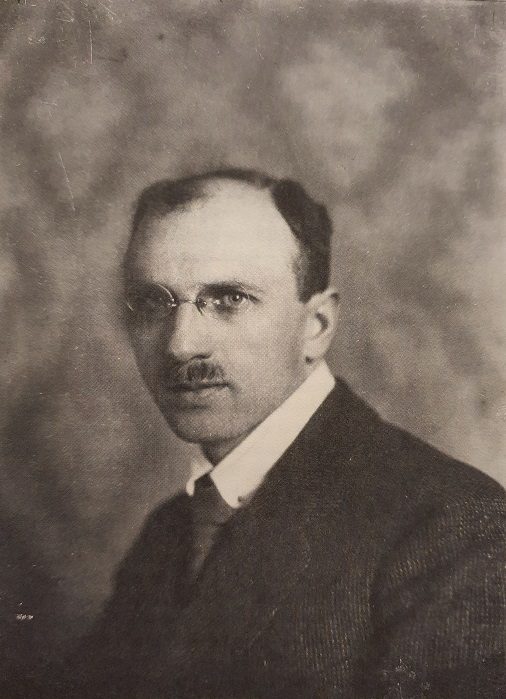
Portrait of Ernst Niekisch

Although they dismissed communism as mere idealism, many of them showed their dependence on some Marxist terminology in their writings. For instance, Jung emphasized the "historical inevitability" of conservatism taking over from the liberal era, in a mirror-image of the historical materialism developed by Karl Marx. Spengler also wrote about the decline of the West as an ineluctable phenomenon, but his intention was to provide modern readers with a "new socialism" that would enable them to realize the meaninglessness of life, contrasting with Marx's idea of the coming of paradise on earth. Above all, the Conservative Revolution drew influences from vitalism (Lebensphilosophie) and irrationalism, not from materialism. Spengler argued that the materialist vision of Marx was based on nineteenth-century science, while the twentieth century would be the age of psychology.

We no longer believe in the power of reason over life. We feel that it is life which dominates reason.

— Oswald Spengler, 1932

Along with Karl Otto Paetel and Heinrich Laufenberg, Ernst Niekisch (from 1926 onwards) was one of the main advocates of National Bolshevism, a minor branch of the Conservative Revolution described as the "left-wing-people of the right" (Linke Leute von rechts). They defended an ultra-nationalist form of socialism that took its roots in both Völkisch extremism and nihilistic Kulturpessimismus, rejecting any Western influence on German society: liberalism and democracy, capitalism and Marxism, the bourgeoisie and the proletariat, Christianity and humanism. Niekisch and National Bolsheviks were even ready to build a temporary alliance with German communists and the Soviet Union in order to annihilate the capitalist West.

== Currents ==
In his PhD thesis supervised by Karl Jaspers, Armin Mohler distinguished five currents inside the nebula of the Conservative Revolution: the Jungkonservativen ("young conservatives"), the Nationalrevolutionäre ("national revolutionaries"), the Völkischen (from the "folkish movement"), the Bündischen ("leaguists") and the Landvolksbewegung ("rural people's movement"). According to Mohler, the last two groups were less theory- and more action-oriented, the Landvolks movement offering concrete resistance in the form of demonstrations and tax boycotts.

French historian Louis Dupeux saw five lines of divisions that can be drawn inside the Conservative Revolutionaries: the small farmers were different from the cultural pessimists and the "pseudo-moderns", who belonged for the most part to the middle class; while the proponent of an "organic" society diverged from those of an "organized" society. A third division split the supporters of deep and lengthy political and cultural transformations from those who endorsed a quick and erupting social revolution, as far as challenging economic freedom and private property. The fourth rift resided in the question of the Drang nach Osten ("drive to the East") and the attitude to adopt towards Bolshevik Russia, escorted by a debate on the place of Germany between a so-called "senile" West and "young and barbaric" Orient; the last division being a deep opposition between the Völkischen and the pre-fascist thinkers.

In 1995, historian Rolf Peter Sieferle described what he labelled five "complexes" in the Conservative Revolution: the "völkischen", the "national socialists", the "revolutionary nationalists" as such, the "vital-activists" (aktivistisch-vitalen), and, a minority in the movement, the "biological naturalists".

Building on the previous studies conducted by Mohler and Dupeux, French political scientist Stéphane François summarized the three main currents within the Conservative Revolution, this broad division being the most widely shared among analysts of the movement:

- the "young conservatives" (Jungkonservativen);
- the "national revolutionaries" (Nationalrevolutionäre);
- the Völkischen (from the Völkisch movement).

=== Young conservatives ===
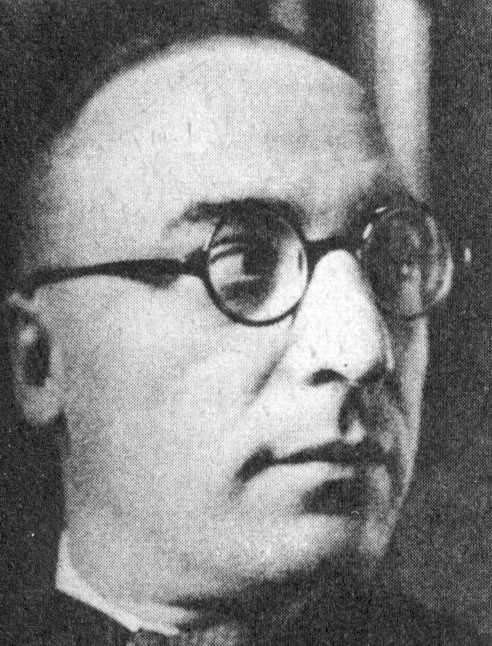
Edgar Jung (c. 1925), a prominent thinker of the Jungkonservativen, was murdered by the SS during the Night of the Long Knives in 1934.

"Young conservatives" were deeply influenced by 19th-century intellectual and aesthetic movements such as German romanticism and Kulturpessimismus ("cultural pessimism"). Contrary to traditional Wilhelmine conservatives, Jungkonservativen aimed at assisting the re-emergence of "persistent and fundamental structures"—authority, the state, the community, the nation, the people—while "espousing their times" in the very same movement.

Moeller van den Bruck tried to overcome the Kulturpessimismus dilemma by fighting decadency to build a new political order over it. In 1923, he published the influential book Das Dritte Reich ("The Third Reich"), in which he went further from theoretical analysis to introduce a practical revolutionary programme as a remedy to the political situation: a "Third Reich" that would unite all classes under an authoritarian rule based on a combination of the nationalism of the right and the socialism of the left.

Rejecting both the nation-state narrowed to one unified people and the imperialistic structure based on different ethnic groups, the goal of Jungkonservativen was to fulfil the Volksmission ("mission of the Volk") through the edification of a new Reich, i.e. "the organization of all the peoples in a supra-state, dominated by a superior principle, under the supreme responsibility of only one people" in the words of Armin Mohler. As summarized by Edgar Jung in 1933:

The concept of the nation-state is the transfer of individualistic doctrines from the individuals to the individual state. [...] The super-state (the Reich) is a form of rule that rises above the Volkstum and can leave it untouched. But it shall not want to be total, and shall recognize autonomies (Autonomien) and sovereignties (Eigenständigkeiten).

— Edgar Jung, 1933

Although Moeller van der Bruck killed himself in despair in May 1925, his ideas continued to influence his contemporaries. Among them was Edgar Jung, who advocated the creation of a corporatist organic state, free from class struggle and parliamentary democracy, which would make way for a return to the spirit of the Middle Ages with a new Holy Roman Empire federating central Europe. The theme of a return to medieval values and aesthetics among "young conservatives" was inherited from a Romantic fascination for that period, which they believed to be simpler and more integrated than the modern world. Oswald Spengler praised medieval chivalry as the philosophical and moral attitude to adopt against a modern decadent spirit. Jung perceived this return as a gradual and lengthy transformation, similar to the Protestant Reformation of the 16th century, rather than a sudden revolutionary eruption like the French Revolution.

=== National revolutionaries ===
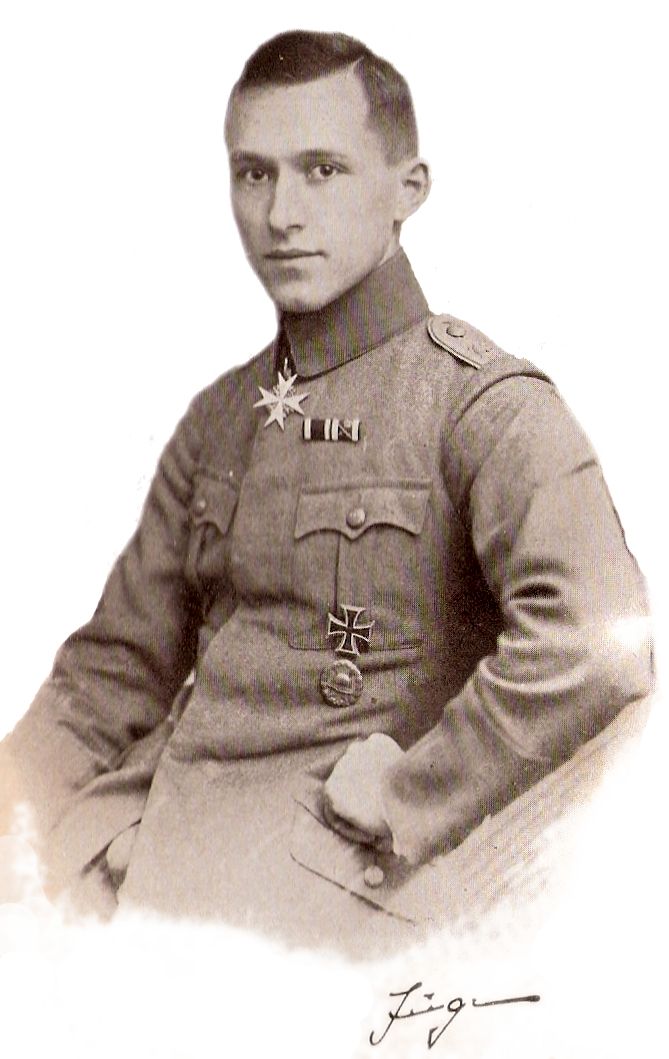
Ernst Jünger (c. 1922), soldier and novelist, considered a major figure of the "National Revolutionaries"

Other Conservative Revolutionaries rather drew influence from their life at the front line (Kriegserlebnis, "war experience") during the First World War. Far from the Kulturpessimismus concern of the "young conservatives", Ernst Jünger and the other "national revolutionaries" advocated total acceptance of modern technique and endorsed the use of any modern phenomena that could help them overcome modernity—such as propaganda or mass organizations—and eventually achieve a new political order. The latter would have been based on life itself rather than the intellect, founded on organic, naturally structured and hierarchical communities, and led by a new aristocracy of merit and action. Historian Jeffrey Herf used the term "reactionary modernism" to describe that "great enthusiasm for modern technology with a rejection of the Enlightenment and the values and institutions of liberal democracy".

That time is only worth destroying. But to destroy it, you have to know it first. [...] You had to completely submit yourself to the technique, by shaping it at last. [...] The apparatus itself deserved no admiration — that was the dangerous thing to do — it just had to be used.

— Franz Schauwecker, 1931

Jünger supported the emergence of a young intellectual elite that would spring out from the trenches of WWI, ready to oppose bourgeois capitalism and to embody a new nationalist revolutionary spirit. In the 1920s, he wrote more than 130 articles in various nationalist magazines, mostly in the Stahlhelm newspaper Die Standarte or, less frequently, in Widerstand, the National-Bolshevik publication of Ernst Niekisch. However, as Dupeux pointed out, Jünger wanted to use nationalism as an "explosive" and not as an "absolute", to eventually let the new order arise by itself. The association of Jünger to the Conservative Revolutionaries is still a matter of debate among scholars.

The entry of Germany in the League of Nations in 1926 participated in radicalizing the revolutionary wing of the movement during the late 1920s. The event was seen as a "sign of a Western orientation" in a country Conservative Revolutionaries had conceived as the future Reich der europäischen Mitte ("Empire of Central Europe").

=== Völkischen ===
The adjective völkisch derives from the German concept of Volk (cognate with English folk), which has overtones of "nation", "race" and "tribe". The Völkisch movement emerged in the mid-19th century, influenced by German Romanticism. Erected on the concept of Blut und Boden ("blood and soil"), it was a racialist, populist, agrarian, romantic nationalist and, from the 1900s, an antisemitic movement. According to Armin Mohler, the Völkischen aimed at opposing the "process of desegregation" that was threatening the Volk by providing him means to generate a consciousness of itself.

Influenced by authors like Arthur de Gobineau (1816–1882), Georges Vacher de Lapouge (1854–1936), Houston Stewart Chamberlain (1855–1927), and Ludwig Woltmann (1871–1907), the Völkischen had conceptualised a racialist and hierarchical definition of human peoples where Aryans (or Germans) were set at the summit of the "white race". But while they used terms like Nordische Rasse ("Nordic race") and Germanentum ("Germanic peoples"), their concept of Volk could also be more flexible and understood as a Gemeinsame Sprache ("common language"), or as an Ausdruck einer Landschaftsseele ("expression of a landscape's soul") in the words of geographer Ewald Banse. The Völkischen indeed idealized the myth of an "original nation"–which they thought could still be found in German rural regions–organised as a form of "primitive democracy freely subjected to their natural elites." The notion of "people" (Volk) subsequently turned into the idea of a birth-giving and eternal entity among Völkischen—in the same way as they would have written on "the Nature"—rather than a sociological category.

The political agitation and uncertainty that followed WWI nourished a fertile background for the renewed success of various Völkisch sects that were abundant in Berlin at the time. The Völkischen became significant by the number of groups during the Weimar Republic, although they were not so by the number of adherents. Some Völkischen tried to revive what they believed to be a true German faith (Deutschglaube), by resurrecting the cult of ancient Germanic gods. Various occult movements such as Ariosophy were connected to Völkisch theories, and artistic circles were largely present among the Völkischen, such as the painters Ludwig Fahrenkrog (1867–1952) and Fidus (1868–1948). By May 1924, Wilhelm Stapel perceived the movement as capable of embracing and reconciling the whole nation: in his view, Völkischen had an idea to spread instead of a party programme, and they were led by "heroes" rather than "calculating politicians".

Mohler listed the following figures as belonging to the Völkisch movement: Theodor Fritsch, Otto Ammon, Willibald Hentschel, Guido von List, Erich Ludendorff, Jörg Lanz von Liebenfels, Herman Wirth, and Ernst Graf zu Reventlow.

== Relationship to Nazism ==
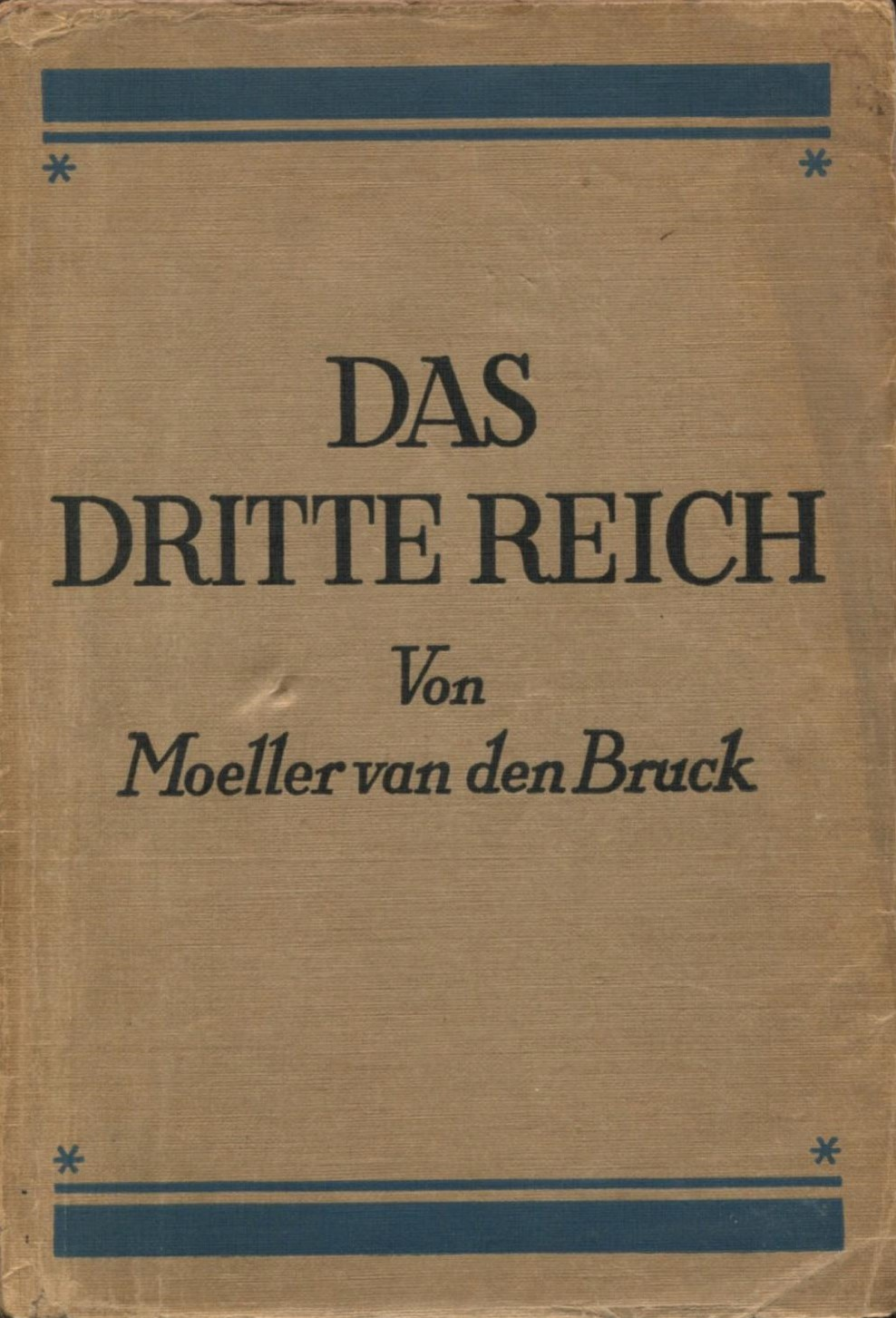
Cover of Arthur Moeller van den Bruck's 1923 book Das Dritte Reich (The Third Reich)

Despite a significant intellectual legacy in common, the disparate movement cannot be easily conflated with Nazism. Their anti-democratic and militaristic thoughts certainly participated in making the idea of an authoritarian regime acceptable to the semi-educated middle-class, and even to the educated youth, but Conservative Revolutionary writings did not have a decisive influence on National Socialist ideology. Historian Helga Grebing indeed reminds that "the question of the susceptibility to and preparation for National Socialism is not the same as the question of the roots and ideological precursors of National Socialism". This ambiguous relationship has led scholars to characterize the movement as a form of "German pre-fascism" or "non-Nazi fascism".

During the rise of power of the Nazi party in the 1920s up until the early 1930s, some thinkers seem to have shown, as historian Roger Woods writes, "a blindness towards the true nature of the Nazis", while their unresolved political dilemma and failure to define the content of a new German regime led to the absence of widely supported alternative propositions from the right, and eventually to a lack of resistance to the Nazi seizure of power. According to historian Fritz Stern, "despite some misgivings about Hitler's demagogy, many conservative revolutionaries saw in the Führer the sole possibility of achieving their goal. In the sequel, Hitler's triumph shattered the illusions of most of Moeller's followers, and the twelve years of the Third Reich witnessed the separation of conservative revolution and national socialism again".

After a few months of adulation in the aftermath of their decisive electoral victory, the Nazis disavowed Moeller van den Bruck and denied that he had been a forerunner of National Socialism: his "unrealistic ideology", as they said in 1939, had "nothing to do with the actual historical developments or with sober Realpolitik" and Hitler "was not Moeller's heir". When taken individually, Conservative Revolutionaries often held ambivalent views of the Nazis, but many of them eventually rejected Nazism and the Nazi party after they seized power in 1933, either owing to its totalitarian or antisemitic character (the "opponents"), or because there would have preferred another form of authoritarian or totalitarian regime (the "competitors"). Stern summarized the relationship in those terms:

But, we must ask, could there have been any other "Third Reich"? Can one abjure reason, glorify force, prophesy the age of the imperial dictator, can one condemn all existing institutions, without preparing the triumph of irresponsibility? The Germanic critics did all that, thereby demonstrating the terrible dangers of the politics of cultural despair.

— Fritz Stern, 1961

=== Opponents ===
Many Conservative Revolutionaries, while keeping on opposing liberalism and still adhering to the notion of a "strong leader", rejected the totalitarian or the antisemitic nature of the Nazi regime. Martin Niemöller, initially a supporter of Adolf Hitler, opposed the Nazification of German Protestant churches in 1934, as well as the Nazis' Aryan Paragraph. Despite having made remarks about Jews that some scholars have called antisemitic, (Note: Niemöller made pejorative remarks about Jews, while at the same time protecting baptised Jewish Christians in his own church, persecuted as Jews by the Nazis. In one sermon in 1935, he remarked: "What is the reason for [their] obvious punishment, which has lasted for thousands of years? Dear brethren, the reason is easily given: the Jews brought the Christ of God to the cross!") he was a leader of the anti-Nazi Confessing Church.

We preferred to keep silent. We are certainly not without guilt, and I ask myself again and again, what would have happened, if in the year 1933 or 1934 — there must have been a possibility — 14,000 Protestant pastors and all Protestant communities in Germany had defended the truth until their deaths? If we had said back then, it is not right when Hermann Göring simply puts 100,000 Communists in the concentration camps, in order to let them die.

— Martin Niemöller, 1946

Rudolf Pechel and Friedrich Hielscher openly opposed the Nazi regime, while Thomas Mann went into exile in 1939 and broadcast anti-Nazi speeches to the German people via the BBC during the war. Ernst Jünger refused a seat in the Reichstag for the Nazi party both in 1927 and in 1933, despised the "blood and soil" doctrine, and his house was raided several times by the Gestapo. Hermann Rauschning and Gottfried Reinhold Treviranus sought refuge abroad to keep on opposing the regime. Georg Quabbe refused to collaborate with the Nazis as a lawyer. Shortly before his death in 1936, Oswald Spengler prophesied that "in ten years, a German Reich [would] probably no longer exist" (Da ja wohl in zehn Jahren ein Deutsches Reich nicht mehr existieren wird!). In his private papers, he denounced Nazi anti-Semitism in strong terms:

How much envy of the capability of other people in view of one's lack of it lies hidden in anti-Semitism! [...] when one would rather destroy business and scholarship than see Jews in them, one is an ideologue, i.e., a danger for the nation. Idiotic.

— Oswald Spengler

Others such as Claus von Stauffenberg remained inside the Reichswehr and later in the Wehrmacht to silently conspire in the 20 July plot of 1944. Fritz Stern stated that it was "a tribute to the genuine spiritual quality of the conservative revolution that the reality of the Third Reich aroused many of them to opposition, sometimes silent, often open and costly. [...] In the final plot against Hitler, in July 1944, a few former conservative revolutionaries risked and lost their lives, martyr to the genuine idealism of their earlier cause."

=== Competitors ===
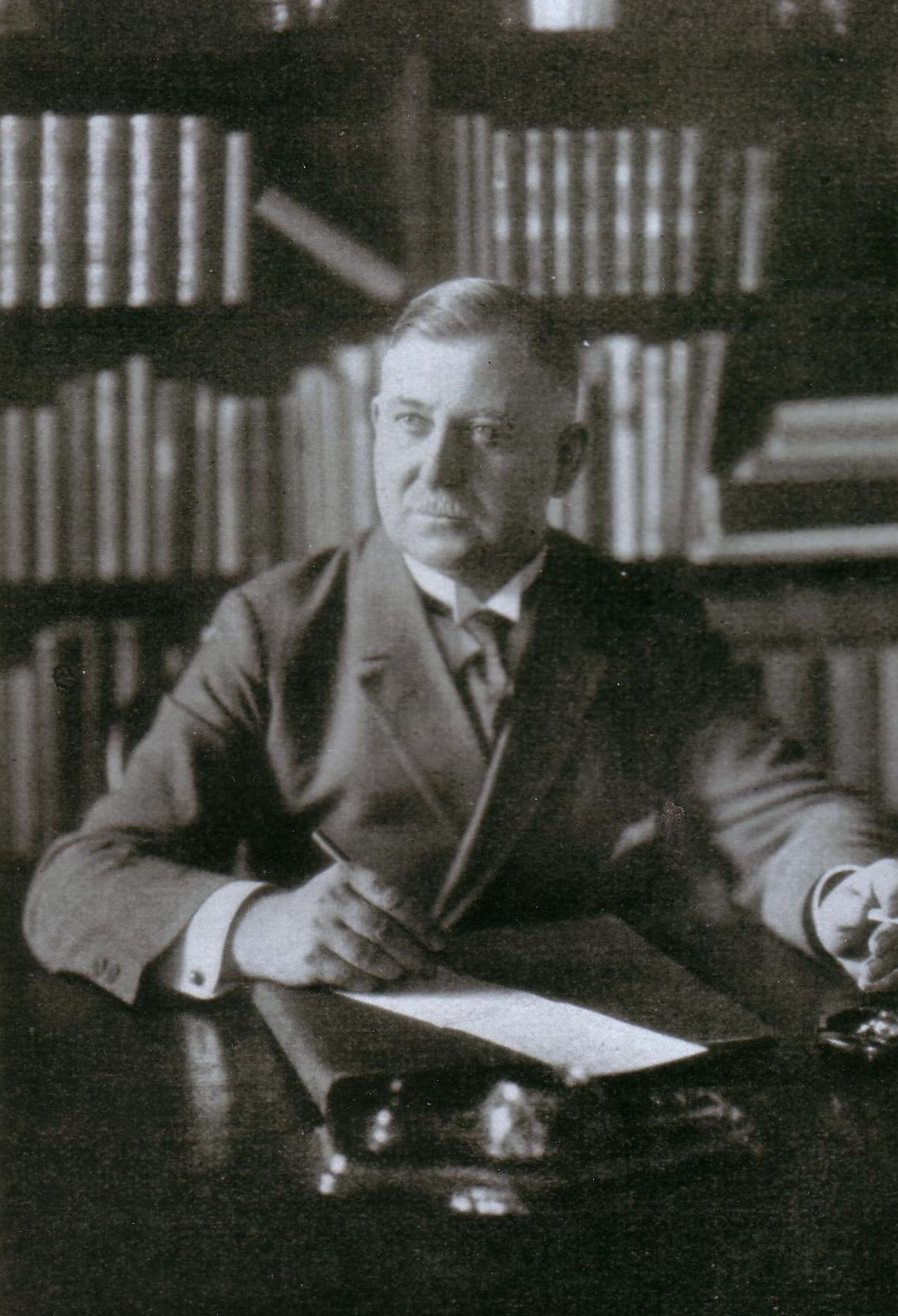
August Winnig in 1920

Some Conservative Revolutionaries did not reject the fascist nature of Nazi rule per se, but would have preferred an alternative authoritarian State. They were often murdered or imprisoned for their deviation from the Führerprinzip.

Edgar Jung, a leading figure of the Conservative Revolution, was murdered during the Night of the Long Knives by the SS of Heinrich Himmler, who wanted to prevent competitive nationalist ideas from opposing or deviating from Hitler's doctrine. For many Conservative Revolutionaries, this event ended the ambivalence between them and the Nazis. Jung promoted a collectivist version of the Conservative Revolution, speaking of nations as being singular organic entities, attacking individualism while praising militarism and war. He also supported "total mobilization" of human and industrial resources, while promoting the productive power of modernity, similar to the futurism espoused by Italian Fascism.

Ernst Niekisch, although anti-Jewish and in favour of a totalitarian state, rejected Adolf Hitler as he felt he lacked any real socialism, and instead found in Joseph Stalin his model for the Führer Principle. He was interned in a concentration camp from 1937 to 1945 for his criticism of the regime. August Winnig, initially welcoming the Nazis in 1933, opposed the Third Reich for his neo-pagan tendencies. Despite a best-selling essay published in 1937 defending fascism and strongly tainted by antisemitism, but that diverged from the official Nazi doctrine on race, he was left alone by the Nazis due to Winnig remaining mostly silent during the rule of Hitler.

=== Collaborators ===
Regarded as the "crown jurist of the Third Reich", Carl Schmitt remained unrepentant even after 1945 for his role in the creation of the Nazi state. Although he considered Adolf Hitler too vulgar, Schmitt was party to the burning of books by Jewish authors, rejoicing in the destruction of "un-German" and "anti-German" material, and calling for a much more extensive purge, to include works by authors influenced by Jewish ideas.

Hans Freyer was the head of the German Institute for Culture in Budapest from 1938 to 1944. Together with Nazi historian Walter Frank, Freyer established a racist and anti-semitic völkisch historiography during that period. Wilhelm Stapel joined the Deutschen Christen in July 1933, spoke vehemently against the anti-Nazi Confessing Church of Martin Niemöller and Karl Barth and advocated for the introduction of the Aryan paragraph in the Church. At the same time Stapel was committed to the policy of Reichsminister of Church Affairs (Reichskirchenminister) Hanns Kerrl, to whom he served as an advisor. However, under pressure from the Nazi leadership in 1938, he had to stop the publication of his monthly magazine Deutsches Volkstum.

== Study and debate ==
The precursor of academic studies of the Conservative Revolution was the French historian Edmond Vermeil, who published in 1938 an essay entitled Doctrinaires de la révolution allemande 1918–1938 ("Doctrinarians of the German revolution 1918–1938"). In the first decades that followed the end of WWII, most of the political theorists who studied the Conservative Revolution and became specialists of the subject were far-right thinkers deeply influenced by Conservative Revolutionary thinkers, such as Armin Mohler and Alain de Benoist. It was not until the 1980–1990s that academic research on the movement began to spread more globally across the political spectrum, mostly due to its controversial relationship with Nazism and later influence on the post-war European New Right.

=== Post-war revival after Armin Mohler ===
The contemporary concept of a "Conservative Revolution" was retrospectively reconstructed after WWII by Neue Richt philosopher Armin Mohler in his 1949 doctoral thesis Die Konservative Revolution in Deutschland 1918–1932, written under the supervision of Karl Jaspers. Mohler called Conservative Revolutionaries the "Trotskyites of the German Revolution", and his appropriation of the concept has been recurrently accused of being a biased attempt to reconstruct a pre-WWII far-right movement acceptable in a post-fascist Europe, by downplaying the influence some of these thinkers had on the rise of Nazism. Subtitled "a handbook", the study was conceived, in the words of historian Roger Griffin, "as a survivalist manual for those who do not wish to lose their spiritual bearings in the present age". Mohler believed that the project of the "Conservative Revolution" had only been postponed by the Nazi seizure of power. He was also at that time the secretary of Ernst Jünger, who had been a major figure of the movement.

During the 1970s, thinkers of the Conservative Revolution were influencing new radical right movements, including the French Nouvelle Droite, led by Alain de Benoist. Some academics, especially in West Germany, took a new interest in the subject and began to suspect Mohler's study for his political closeness to the concept. The reactionary and anti-modern characters of the "Conservative Revolution" were largely emphasised during that decade, and the movement was seen as nothing more than a fertile ground for Nazism, speaking "the same totalitarian languages".

German-American historian Fritz Stern used the term "Conservative Revolution" in his 1961 book The Politics of Cultural Despair to describe the life and ideas of Arthur Moeller van den Bruck, and rather drew attention to the alienation and "cultural despair" these authors experienced in the nascent modern world, which led them to express such radical ideas in response. Stern grouped, however, Moeller van den Bruck into a larger "Germanic ideology", along with earlier thinkers from the late 19th century like Paul de Lagarde and Julius Langbehn.

=== Academic research since the 1980s ===
In a 1981 symposium entitled "Conservative revolution and modernity", French historian Louis Dupeux pointed out that what Mohler had called the "Conservative Revolution" was in reality neither truly reactionary nor totally anti-modern (they could even show optimism towards the modern world). This analysis was supported three years later by American historian Jeffrey Herf in his book Reactionary Modernism, which highlighted the acceptance of modern technique besides a rejection of liberal democracy among conservative thinkers of that period. Dupeux also stressed that Conservative Revolutionaries were not only opposed to the "two forms of progressivism", namely liberalism and Marxism, but also to the "cultural pessimism" of the reactionary and conservative right, a standoff they attempted to overcome by proposing an innovative form of reactionary regimes that could espouse the new frameworks of the modern world.

In his 1993 book Anatomie der Konservativen Revolution ("Anatomy of the Conservative Revolution"), German sociologist Stefan Breuer rejected Mohler's definition of the term "Conservative Revolution", defining "conservatism" as the aspiration to conserve the structures of feudal Germany, in fact, a political project already moribund during the Weimar period. The "Conservative Revolution" constructed by Mohler was, in his view, the mirror-image of an emerging modern society that took conscious of the deadlocks and dangers of a "simple modernity" built on science and technique only. While noting the complexity that would imply an intellectual classification of that period, Breuer stated that he would have preferred the substitute "new nationalism" to designate a more charismatic and holistic version of the German right-wing movements, contrasting with the "old nationalism" of the 19th century, a current which had essentially been aiming at preserving traditional institutions and German influence in the world.

In 1996, British historian Roger Woods recognized the validity of the concept, while stressing the eclectic character of the movement and their inability to form a common agenda, a political deadlock he labelled the "conservative dilemma". Woods described the Conservative Revolution as "ideas which cannot simply be explained and summarised as if they were a political programme, but rather as expressions of tension". Regarding the ambiguous relationship with Nazism, downplayed by Mohler in his 1949 thesis and accentuated by 1970s analysts, Woods argued that "regardless of individual Conservative Revolutionary criticisms of the Nazis, the deeper commitment to activism, strong leadership, hierarchy and a disregard for political programmes persists. [...] Unresolved political dilemmas result in an activism and an interest in hierarchy which mean that there can be no fundamental objection to the National Socialist assumption of power."

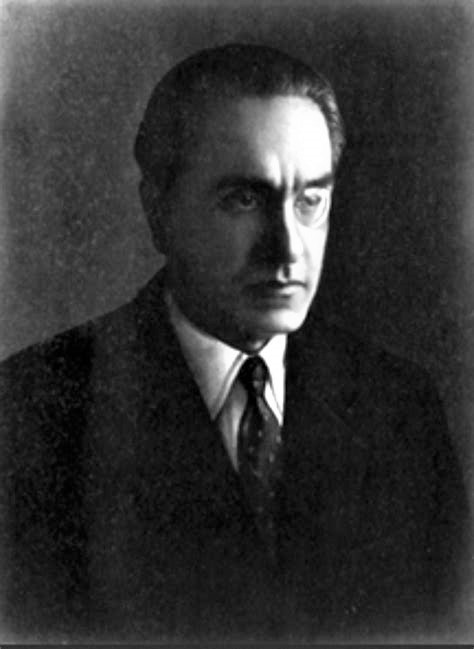
Italian philosopher Julius Evola is often associated with the Conservative Revolution.

Historian Ishay Landa has described the nature of the Conservative Revolution's "socialism" as decidedly capitalist. Landa points out that Oswald Spengler's "Prussian Socialism" strongly opposed labor strikes, trade unions, progressive taxation or any imposition of taxes on the rich, any shortening of the working day, as well as any form of government insurance for sickness, old age, accidents, or unemployment. At the same time as he rejected any social democratic provisions, Spengler celebrated private property, competition, imperialism, capital accumulation, and "wealth, collected in few hands and among the ruling classes". Landa describes Spengler's "Prussian Socialism" as "working a whole lot, for the absolute minimum, but — and this is a vital aspect — being happy about it." Landa likewise describes Arthur Moeller van den Bruck as a "socialist champion of capitalism" who praised free trade, flourishing markets, the creative value of the entrepreneur, and the capitalist division of labor, and sought to emulate British and French imperialism. Landa notes the similarities of Moeller's critiques of socialism with those of neoliberals such as Friedrich von Hayek and writes that "far from hostile to the bourgeois spirit, Moeller's text is suffused with such spirit."

== Later influence ==
The movement influenced contemporary thinkers outside of German-speaking Europe. Among them, the Italian philosopher Julius Evola is often associated with the Conservative Revolution.

The Nouvelle Droite, a French far-right philosophical movement created in the 1960s to adapt traditionalist, ethnopluralist and illiberal politics to the European post-WWII context and to distance itself from earlier forms of far-right like fascism, mainly through a project of pan-European nationalism have been deeply influenced by the Conservative Revolution, as well as its German counterpart the Neue Rechte.

The ideology and theoretical structure of the Identitarian movement is mainly inspired by the Nouvelle Droite, the Neue Rechte, and through them by the Conservative Revolution.

== Cultural depiction ==
The Conservative Revolution was emphatically depicted in the German TV series Babylon Berlin.

== See also ==
- Authoritarian conservatism
  - Para-fascism
- Conservatism in Germany
- German nationalism
- Philosophy of Ernst Jünger
