= Anti-Nazism =

Opposition to Nazism

Swastika in a prohibition sign.

Anti-Nazism refers to the opposition to the ideology, policies, and practices of Nazism (National Socialism). While it shares common ground with the broader anti-fascist movement, anti-Nazism is a distinct phenomenon that specifically targets the unique tenets of the Nazi regime, such as its racial hierarchy, virulent antisemitism, and the expansionist concept of Lebensraum.

Historical anti-Nazism was not limited to the political left or liberal democrats, but it also covered considerable opposition within ultra-nationalists and even fascist camps. Certain fascist movements, such as Austrofascism in the 1930s, saw Austrian–German Nazism as a geopolitical threat or ideological distortion, resulting in violent confrontation between competing radical right-wing factions. Consequently, anti-Nazism represents a complex spectrum of resistance, ranging from communism to fascism.

== Background ==
Opposition to Nazism emerged with the rise of the NSDAP in the 1920s. The initial resistance was led by the Social Democratic Party of Germany and the Communist Party of Germany, but as the Nazi Party came to power after 1933, religious groups, conservative military officers, and even dissident factions within the broader nationalist movement diversified.

== Ideological varieties ==
=== Religious opposition ===
Both Catholic and Protestant institutions expressed their opposition to Nazism in significantly moral and practical ways. The Confessing Church, led by Martin Niemöller and Dietrich Bonhoeffer, opposed the state's attempt to "Nazify" the church, while the papal encyclical Mit brennender Sorge (1937) contained a formal condemnation of Nazi racial ideology.

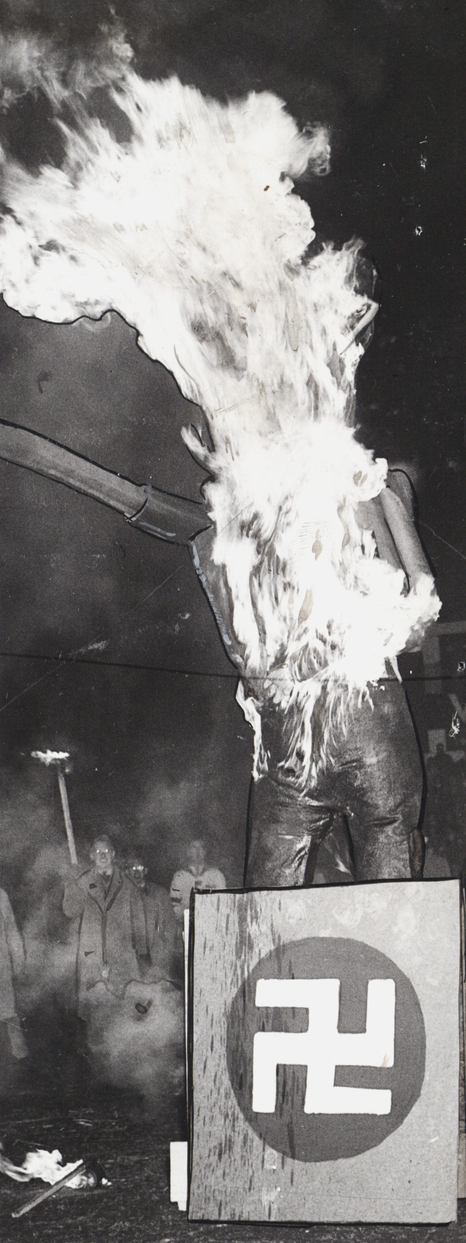
Effigy of Hitler being burned at Molson Stadium

=== Conservative and military opposition ===
Unlike the left-wing anti-fascists, conservative anti-Nazis often supported strong national sovereignty but rejected the totalitarian and pagan aspects of Hitler's rule. This culminated in the 20 July plot of 1944, led by Claus von Stauffenberg, which aimed to assassinate Hitler and establish a authoritarian conservative government to sue for peace.

=== Fascist and ultranationalist opposition ===
Historically, not all fascist or far-right movements were aligned with Nazism. Some of them rejected Nazism due to geopolitical rivalries or ideological disagreements with Nazi racial theories.

- Austrofascism: Under Engelbert Dollfuss and Kurt Schuschnigg, the Austrian Fatherland Front established a clerical-fascist regime that explicitly opposed Nazism. They sought to maintain Austrian independence against a German Anschluss and they believed that the Nazi racial doctrine was incompatible with Catholic social teaching.
- Early Italian Fascism: In the early 1930s, Benito Mussolini expressed skepticism toward Nazi "Nordicism" and racial theories. Following the assassination of Dollfuss by Austrian Nazis in 1934, Mussolini mobilized troops and sent them to the Brenner Pass to deter a German invasion, viewing Nazism as a threat to the European balance of power. Despite Mussolini's turn toward Nazism in the late 1930s, a few Italian fascists, including Dino Grandi and Italo Balbo, were hostile to Nazi Germany because they opposed racial antisemitism.

Some people and organizations which were related to the proto-fascist German Conservative Revolution Movement also opposed Nazism, including Edgar Jung and the Young German Order (Jungdo). (Note: The Jungdo was classified as right-of-centre because, at the time, it was a national-liberal movement that supported the democracy of the Weimar Republic, despite being partially antisemitic.) The French fascist politician Georges Valois consistently held anti-Nazi views and later, he died in a Nazi concentration camp after he joined the French Resistance.

== See also ==
- Anti-Nazi Council
- Anti-Nazi Freedom Movement
- Denazification
- German resistance to Nazism
- Legality of Holocaust denial

== Bibliography ==
- Evans, Richard J. (2005). The Third Reich in Power. Penguin Books. ISBN 978-0143037903.
- Kershaw, Ian (2000). Hitler: 1936-1945 Nemesis. W. W. Norton & Company. ISBN 978-0393049947.
- Payne, Stanley G. (1995). A History of Fascism, 1914–1945. University of Wisconsin Press. ISBN 978-0299148744.
- Sternhell, Zeev (1994). The Birth of Fascist Ideology. Princeton University Press. ISBN 978-0691032894.
- Dupeux, Louis (1992). La Révolution conservatrice allemande sous la République de Weimar. Paris: Kimé. ISBN 978-2908212181.
