= Free-Germany Movement =

Free-Germany movement
- Leader: Otto Strasser
- Founded: 30 January 1941
- Dissolved: Late 1942
- Ideology: Anti-Nazism

The Free-Germany Movement (German: Frei-Deutschland-Bewegung) was a movement of German exiled opponents to the rule of Adolf Hitler during the Second World War. The movement was led by Otto Strasser.

== Founding ==
The Free-Germany Movement was founded on January 30, 1941 (the 8th anniversary of Hitler's take-over of power in Germany), in part as a continuation of emigre remnants of Strasser's Black Front group. Strasser modelled his organization on the 'Free France' of Charles de Gaulle. The group began publishing propaganda material in German, English and Spanish languages. In its first proclamation the Free-Germany Movement called for "struggle against Nazism and punishment of the guilty" as well as calling for a democratic constitution, federalism and autonomy, peace between democracies and God-fearing policies.

== Organization ==
Whilst Strasser was living in Canada at the time, the group had most of its followers in Latin America. The organization had two main offices, one in New York City headed by Kurt Singer and one in Buenos Aires headed by Bruno Fricke. Strasser named Fricke as the leader of the Free-Germany Movement in Latin America, a role Fricke had also occupied in the Black Front. Friecke was also named First Vice Chairman of the organization. In Uruguay the landesleiter was Erico Schoemann who was an old Black Front support and who ran the publication Die Zeit/El Tiempo in Montevideo. The Free-Germany Movement also had small units in West Canada, China and South Africa (the latter unit was led by August Pokorski). The Free-Germany Movement was politically broader than Strasser's previous grouping, gathering people with Christian, national-conservative or social democratic backgrounds. For example the landesleiter ('Country Leader') of the Free-Germany Movement in Brazil was Helmut Hütter, an Austrian who hailed from a conservative Catholic background. In Bolivia, where the size of the organization was rather marginal, it was led by Hugo Efferoth, a former social democrat.

== Disintegration ==
Whilst Strasser had built an impressive organization on paper, the organization soon withered apart. He tried to impose himself as the sole authority in the movement, but the organization was far too heterogenerous for such an approach to work. The sole key characteristic of all members of the organization was their anti-communist orientation. In November 1941 Strasser dismissed his landesleiter in Colombia, in 1942 the landesleiters in Venezuela and Chile. By late 1942 the organization was largely defunct.

== Isolation in emigre community ==
Strasser had also hoped to build unity with other German exiled opposition groups, but found himself politically isolated. For example he sought contact with the Social Democrat Albert Grzesinski in the United States and the Anti-Nazi Freedom Movement in Colombia. The nationalist, clerical, conservative and authoritarian tendencies of Strasser's grouping made collaboration with German leftist and Jewish exiled opposition groups impossible. The organization was frequently attacked in the progressive emigre German press in Latin America.

== Failed overture to Allies ==
The movement aspired to build a 'Free-German Legion' to join the war on the Allied side. The effort was not successful. On the contrary, Strasser was placed in an Allied internment camp between 1943 and 1946.

== On Austrian question ==
Keeping a Greater German nationalist outlook, the Free-German Movement opposed the formation of an exiled Austrian national government. Rather than organizing an 'Austrian' section, Austrian members of the organization joined their respective 'Gaue'.

== Later period ==
The influence of the Free-Germany Movement dwindled, albeit Die Zeit continued to appear in Montevideo until 1946. As of 1946, the Free-Germany Movement welcomed Nuremberg trials sentences against Hermann Göring and Julius Streicher, but considered the sentencing of Karl Dönitz unjust.
