= Stefan Breuer =

German sociologist

- Born: 9 December 1948 (age 77)
- Education: Universities of Mainz, Munich and Berlin
- Occupation: Sociologist

Stefan Breuer (born 9 December 1948) is a German sociologist who specializes in the writings of Max Weber and the German political right between 1871 and 1945.

== Life and career ==
Born in 1948, Breuer studied political science, history and philosophy at the universities of Mainz, Munich and Berlin. Between 1974 and 1984, he was an assistant researcher in political science at Leibniz University Hannover. Since 1984, he has been professor of sociology at the University of Hamburg, and since 2014 a professor emeritus.

Along with Dirk Kaesler, Johannes Weiß and Wolfgang Schluchter, he is one of the most distinguished German experts on Max Weber's writings. He is also known for his works on the political right in Germany between 1871 and 1945, and criticised Armin Mohler's construct of the "Conservative Revolution".

== Works ==
- Kritische Theorie.Schlüsselbegriffe, Kontroversen, Grenzen Mohr Siebeck, Tübingen 2016, ISBN 978-3-16-154610-5.
- Der charismatische Staat: Ursprünge und Frühformen staatlicher Herrschaft. Wissenschaftliche Buchgesellschaft, Darmstadt 2014, ISBN 978-3-534-26459-9.
- Carl Schmitt im Kontext: Intellektuellenpolitik in der Weimarer Republik. Akademie-Verlag, Berlin 2012, ISBN 978-3-05-005943-3.
- „Herrschaft“ in der Soziologie Max Webers. Harrassowitz, Wiesbaden 2011, ISBN 978-3-447-06606-8.
- mit Maurizio Bach: Faschismus als Bewegung und Regime: Italien und Deutschland im Vergleich. VS, Wiesbaden 2010, ISBN 978-3-531-17369-6.
- Die radikale Rechte in Deutschland 1871–1945: Eine politische Ideengeschichte. Reclam, Stuttgart 2010, ISBN 978-3-15-018776-0.
- (mit Ina Schmidt) Die Kommenden: Eine Zeitschrift der Bündischen Jugend (1926–1933). Wochenschau-Verlag, Schwalbach am Taunus 2009, ISBN 3-89974-529-9.
- Die Völkischen in Deutschland. Kaiserreich und Weimarer Republik. Wissenschaftliche Buchgesellschaft, Darmstadt 2008, ISBN 978-3-534-21354-2.
- mit Andreas Anter: Max Webers Staatssoziologie. Positionen und Perspektiven. Nomos, Baden-Baden 2007, ISBN 978-3-8329-2773-8.
- Max Webers tragische Soziologie: Aspekte und Perspektiven. Mohr Siebeck, Tübingen 2006, ISBN 3-16-148856-3.
- hrsg. mit Ina Schmidt: Ernst Jünger – Friedrich Hielscher: Briefe 1927–1985. Klett Cotta, Stuttgart 2005, ISBN 3-608-93617-3.
- Nationalismus und Faschismus: Frankreich, Italien und Deutschland im Vergleich. Wissenschaftliche Buchgesellschaft, Darmstadt 2005, ISBN 3-534-17994-3.
- Moderner Fundamentalismus. Philo, Berlin/Wien 2002, ISBN 3-8257-0319-3.
- Ordnungen der Ungleichheit – die deutsche Rechte im Widerstreit ihrer Ideen 1871–1945. Wissenschaftliche Buchgesellschaft, Darmstadt 2001, ISBN 3-534-15575-0.
- Georg Jellinek und Max Weber: von der sozialen zur soziologischen Staatslehre. Nomos, Baden-Baden 1999, ISBN 3-7890-6107-7.
- Grundpositionen der deutschen Rechten 1871–1945. Edition diskord, Tübingen 1999, ISBN 3-89295-666-9.
- Der Staat. Entstehung, Typen, Organisationsstadien. Rowohlt, Reinbek bei Hamburg 1998, ISBN 3-499-55593-X
- Ästhetischer Fundamentalismus. Stefan George und der deutsche Antimodernismus. Primus, Darmstadt 1995, ISBN 3-89678-003-4.
- Anatomie der konservativen Revolution. Wissenschaftliche Buchgesellschaft, Darmstadt 1995, ISBN 3-534-11802-2.
- Bürokratie und Charisma: zur politischen Soziologie Max Webers. Wissenschaftliche Buchgesellschaft, Darmstadt 1994, ISBN 3-534-12336-0.
- Die Gesellschaft des Verschwindens. Von der Selbstzerstörung der technischen Zivilisation. Rotbuch, Hamburg 1992, ISBN 3-88022-379-3.
- Aspekte totaler Vergesellschaftung. Ça ira, Freiburg im Breisgau 1985, ISBN 3-924627-03-7.
- hrsg. mit Hubert Treiber: Zur Rechtssoziologie Max Webers: Interpretation, Kritik, Weiterentwicklung. Westdeutscher Verlag, Opladen 1984, ISBN 3-531-11706-8.
- Sozialgeschichte des Naturrechts. Westdeutscher Verlag, Opladen 1983, ISBN 3-531-11631-2 (Habilitationsschrift).
- Die Krise der Revolutionstheorie. Negative Vergesellschaftung und Arbeitsmetaphysik bei Herbert Marcuse. Frankfurt am Main 1977, ISBN 3-8108-0038-4 (Dissertation, FU Berlin, 1977).
