= Georg Quabbe =

German lawyer and essayist (1887–1950)

Georg Quabbe (10 March 1887 – 17 July 1950) was a German lawyer and essayist.

== Life and career ==
Georg Quabbe was born in 1887 in Breslau (now Wrocław), the son of Ferdinand Quabbe, a merchant from the same city, and Anna Naundorf. After graduating with a PhD in law, he worked as a judicial trainee in Breslau. In 1912, he married Erika Auguste Margarete Bucksch, a merchant's daughter. The couple divorced on 5 October 1915. He married his second wife, Elisabeth von Heyden, on 19 May 1922.

In 1927, he wrote the essay Tar a Ri. Variationen über ein konservatives Thema ("Tar a Ri. Variations on a conservative theme"), embodying the moderate section of the Conservative Revolution. He is considered by Armin Mohler to be one of the most influential thinkers of the latter movement.

On October 17, 1946, Quabbe, who had refused to collaborate with the Nazis, was appointed Attorney General (Generalstaatsanwalt) of the State of Hesse by Georg-August Zinn, Hesse's Minister of Justice at the time. He died in 1950 in Frankfurt of a stroke.

== Works ==
- Die völkerrechtliche Garantie (Dissertation). Breslau (1909) 1911.
- Tar a Ri. Variationen über ein konservatives Thema. Berlin 1927 (Nachdruck 2007, ISBN 3-922-11931-X).
- Das letzte Reich. Wandel und Wesen der Utopie. Leipzig 1933 (Nachdruck 2014, ISBN 978-3-939869-64-1).
- Goethes Freunde. Drei Essays. Stuttgart 1949.
