= Das Reich =

Das Reich may refer to:

- 2nd SS Panzer Division Das Reich
- Synonym for Deutsches Reich, often used as a universal term, translates to "The Empire or The Realm"
- Das Reich (newspaper), a National Socialist newspaper
- Das Reich, the main work of German right-wing intellectual Friedrich Hielscher (1932)
- Das Reich, a journal during the Weimar Republic (1930-33), edited by Friedrich Hielscher
