= Stapel =

Stapel may refer to:

- Huub Stapel (born 1954) is a Dutch actor.
- Diederik Stapel (born 1966) is a Dutch former professor of social psychology at Tilburg University.
- Wilhelm Stapel (1882-1954) was the German editor of the antisemitic magazine Deutsches Volkstum.
- Stapel, Schleswig-Holstein, a municipality in Schleswig-Holstein, Germany
