= Wilhelm Stapel =

German writer (1882–1954)

- Born: 27 October 1882; Kalbe, Germany
- Died: 1 June 1954 (aged 71); Hamburg, West Germany
- Education: University of Göttingen (PhD)
- Known for: Pro-Nazi theologian

Otto Friedrich Wilhelm Stapel (27 October 1882 – 1 June 1954), was a German Protestant and nationalist essayist. He was the editor of the influential antisemitic monthly magazine Deutsches Volkstum from 1919 until its shutdown by the Nazis in 1938.

While holding cultural antisemitic thesis that diverged from the racialist Nazi doctrines, and advocating for less harmful measures to be taken against Jews, Stapel nonetheless collaborated with many Nazi institutions and official figures. He spoke vehemently against the anti-Nazi Confessing Church of Martin Niemöller and Karl Barth, and defended the policy of Reich Bishop Ludwig Müller. At the same time Stapel was committed to the policy of Reichsminister of Church Affairs (Reichskirchenminister) Hanns Kerrl, to whom he served as an advisor.

After 1945, Stapel despised the new German Federal Republic and, in 1949, called for a boycott of the Bundestag elections. He died in Hamburg in 1954 at the age of 71, largely unnoticed from the public.

== Biography ==
=== Early life ===
Otto Friedrich Wilhelm Stapel was born on 27 October 1882 in Kalbe, the son of a Prussian watchmaker. He soon became a journalist under the influence of Friedrich Naumann in 1903. In 1905 he graduated from high school (Abitur), before joining Ferdinand Avenarius' magazine Der Kunstwart in November 1911. The same year, he earned a PhD in art history at the University of Göttingen, after a doctoral thesis under the supervision of Edmund Husserl titled Der Meister des Salzwedeler Hochaltars. Nebst einem Überblick über die gotischen Schnitzaltäre der Altmark ("The Master of Salzwedel's high altar. In addition to an overview of the Gothic carved altars of the Altmark").

From 1903 to 1914, Stapel was a left-wing liberal but also an aggressive nationalist. He abominated in his articles what he called "Wilhelmian histrionics" and bourgeois materialism. The patriotic experience of WWI turned Stapel into a right-winger and a supporter of Ludendorff's annexations programme in Poland. Adopting the Volksgedanke ("thought of the folk") as the essence for his political theories, he became, from 1919 until its shutdown by the Nazis in 1938, editor in chief of Deutsches Volkstum ("German folkdom"), a nationalist and antisemitic monthly journal from Hamburg owned by the nationalist trade-union of German salesclerks (DHV).

=== Collaboration under Nazi rule ===
After the great electoral success of the Nazi Party in September 1930, Stapel published a few months later a small brochure titled Sechs Kapitel über Christentum und Nationalsozialismus ("Six Chapters on Christianity and National Socialism"), and he welcomed the Nazis as an elementary and instinct-led (Volksinstinkt) movement.

Stapel joined the Deutschen Christen in July 1933, to which he remained loyal even after the mass withdrawals of November 1933. He spoke vehemently against the anti-Nazi Confessing Church of Martin Niemöller and Karl Barth, this polemical dispute shaping numerous articles that appeared in the following years in Deutsches Volkstum.

Stapel defended the policy of Reich Bishop Ludwig Müller and advocated for the introduction of the Aryan paragraph in the Church, claiming that the Jewish Christians should organise themselves in their own church. At the same time he was committed to the policy of Reichsminister of Church Affairs (Reichskirchenminister) Hanns Kerrl, to whom he served as an advisor. However, under pressure from the Nazi leadership in 1938, Stapel had to stop the publication of his monthly magazine Deutsches Volkstum.

=== Later life ===
After 1945, Stapel despised the new German Federal Republic and, in 1949, called for a boycott of the Bundestag elections. As late as 1953, he claimed the Bundestag was only an "aid institution for the relief of the occupying powers". The same critics can be found in various articles Stapel published in the magazine Nation Europa in the early 1950s.

In 1951, Stapel published the book Über das Christentum. An die Denkenden unter seinen Verächtern ("About Christianity. To the thinkers among its contemners"), dedicated to the newly elected President of the Federal Republic of Germany, Theodor Heuss, his former friend from the Der Kunstwart period.

Stapel died in Hamburg on 1 June 1954 at the age of 71, largely unnoticed from the public.

== Nationalist and antisemitic theories ==
Armin Mohler considered Wilhelm Stapel to be one of the most influential thinkers of the Conservative Revolution.

== Thought ==
=== National-Protestantism ===
After the experience of WWI, Stapel began to develop ideas of strong leadership against the Weimar Republic's parliamentary democracy, when he argued that this regime was unsuited to turbulent times and that "free, spontaneous, dominant personalities" were needed to make quick and responsible decisions. In his essay, published in 1932 and respected at that time among German right-wing circles, Der christliche Staatsmann: Eine Theologie des Nationalismus ("The Christian Statesman: a Theology of Nationalism"), he tried to legitimise the chiliastic Imperium Teutonicum he had long been advocated for. In this sense, he stood entirely in the tradition that historian Clemens Vollnhals has called Nationalprotestantismus ("National Protestantism"). Stapel had already published a specific theology of war in another essay, Ideen von 1914 ("Ideas of 1914"), where he wrote about his faith in a special divine mission for the German people.

According to historian Roger Woods, Stapel's apparently grounded theories against the Weimar system should not obscure the fact that they were theorised as a response to the political dilemma of the Conservative Revolution and their lack of programmatic detail. Stapel was above all a supporter of an "instinctive form of election" where he focused on the personalities of the candidates and "dismissed political programmes as largely produced for propaganda purposes".

=== Cultural antisemitism ===
Writing about Volk and Volkstum when he defined Germans and Jews in broad generalisations, he however refused to use Nazi concepts on race. According to Stapel, the Volk was an "irrational, non-reflective, God-given entity" that one was not able to fully understand with concepts but could only experience.

Inspired by Oswald Spengler's thesis on the cultural confrontation between Jews as whom Spengler described as a Magian people versus Europeans as a Faustian people, Stapel described Jews as a landless nomadic people in pursuit of an transnational culture (e.g. "international" versions of socialism, pacifism or capitalism) whereby they can integrate into Western civilisation by transgressing national cultural boundaries. He saw the Jews as the typical expression of materialism and intellectualism that were draining Germans dry from their imagination and instinctive feelings. Although he dismissed German Christians that rejected the Old Testament or the Jewishness of Christ, Stapel participated in spreading the idea that Christian philosophy had nothing to say about racial discrimination and encouraged the Nazis in their creation of a "Positive Christianity".

Nonetheless, Stapel never advocated physical maltreatment of the Jews or a full denial of their civil rights. He believed however that borders had to be drawn regarding the Jewish influence in Germany, as they should not be involved in politics, except on a case by case basis. In 1932, he listed what measures he expected to be taken by the Nazis regarding the Jewish question: "ousting unpatriotic Jewish journalists, barring Jews from the armed forces, and creating a separate educational institutions and courts for the Jews".

== Published works ==
- Avenarius-Buch. Ein Bild des Mannes aus seinen Gedichten und Aufsätzen. Callwey, Munich 1916.
- Die Fiktionen der Weimarer Verfassung – Versuch einer Unterscheidung der formalen und der funktionalen Demokratie. Hanseatische Verlagsanstalt, Hamburg 1928.
- Antisemitismus und Antigermanismus – Über das seelische Problem der Symbiose des deutschen und des jüdischen Volkes. Hanseatische Verlagsanstalt, Hamburg 1928.
- Literatenwäsche. Mit Zeichnungen A. Paul Webers, Widerstandsverlag Anna Niekisch, Leipzig 1929, ab 1930 Hanseatische Verlagsanstalt Hamburg.
- Sechs Kapitel über Christentum und Nationalsozialismus, 1931
- Der christliche Staatsmann: Eine Theologie des Nationalismus, 1932
- Preußen muß sein, Hanseatische Verlagsanstalt, Hamburg 1932
- Die Kirche Christi und der Staat Hitlers, Hanseatische Verlagsanstalt, Hamburg 1933
- Die literarische Vorherrschaft der Juden in Deutschland 1918 bis 1933. Hanseatische Verlagsanstalt, Hamburg 1937. (Schriften des Reichsinstituts für Geschichte des neuen Deutschlands, Bd. 7).
- Das Gesetz unseres Lebens, Hanseatische Verlagsanstalt, Hamburg 1939
- Über das Christentum. An die Denkenden unter seinen Verächtern, 1951.

== Bibliography ==
- Gailus, Manfred; Vollnhals, Clemens (2016). Für ein artgemäßes Christentum der Tat: Völkische Theologen im "Dritten Reich". Vandenhoeck & Ruprecht. ISBN 9783847005872.
- Kaes, Anton; Jay, Martin; Dimendberg, Edward (1995). The Weimar Republic Sourcebook. University of California Press. ISBN 9780520067752.
- Kessler, Heinrich (1967). Wilhelm Stapel als politischer Publizist: Ein Beitrag zur Geschichte des konservativen Nationalismus zwischen den beiden Weltkriegen. Lorenz Spindler Verlag. OCLC 2936189.
- Niewyk, Donald L. (2001). The Jews in Weimar Germany. Transaction Publishers. ISBN 9781412837521.
- Woods, Roger (1996). The Conservative Revolution in the Weimar Republic. Springer. ISBN 9780230375857.

== See also ==
- Conservative Revolution
