= Edmond Vermeil =

French academic

Edmond Vermeil (French pronunciation: [vɛʁmɛj]; 29 May 1878 – 14 April 1964) was a French academic. He was a specialist in the German culture.

He was born at Vevey, and brought up in the little village of Congénies in the south of France. He died, aged 85, in Paris.

Vermeil is a precursor of academic studies of the Conservative Revolution and published in 1938 an essay entitled Doctrinaires de la révolution allemande 1918–1938 ("Doctrinarians of the German revolution 1918–1938").
