= European New Right =

Far-right political movement that emerged in Europe in the 1960s

The European New Right (ENR) is a far-right intellectual movement which originated in France in the late 1960s around Alain de Benoist and the Nouvelle Droite. Its proponents are involved in a global "anti-structural revolt" against modernity and postmodernity, operating largely in the form of loosely connected intellectual networks that seek to disseminate a shared worldview within European societies. It is distinct from the (primarily Anglophone) New Right, which is generally supportive of capitalism.

ENR theorists are generally opposed to liberalism, individualism, egalitarianism, and the modern nation-state, and instead endorse a communitarian and organicist worldview. Central to their doctrine is the notion of ethnopluralism, framed as a worldwide alternative to multiculturalism, in which distinct collective identities are expected to coexist peacefully within separated geographical and political units. The movement does not, however, articulate a unified programme concerning political regimes or institutional arrangements. Rather than pursuing immediate electoral results, ENR leaders endeavour to advance their ideas through a "metapolitical" strategy aimed at securing long-term cultural hegemony and broader popular acceptance of their positions.

The European New Right has influenced the ideological and political structure of the Identitarian Movement. Part of the alt-right also claims to have been inspired by Alain de Benoist's writings, arguably the most influential figure of the movement.

== History ==
The European New Right (ENR) emerged in France from the Nouvelle Droite, an intellectual movement linked to the ethno-nationalist think tank GRECE, established in 1968 by Alain de Benoist and Dominique Venner. The original prominence of the French nucleus has declined over the decades, and the movement now appears in the form of a European network of various groups, parties and intellectuals, all sharing ideological similarities and affinities between each other. Among them are the Neue Rechte in Germany, New Right (defunct) in the United Kingdom, Nieuw Rechts (defunct) and Deltastichting in the Netherlands and Flanders, Forza Nuova in Italy, Imperium Europa in Malta, Nova Hrvatska Desnica in Croatia, or Noua Dreapta in Romania. In Italy, the Nuova Destra emerged from the initiative of a group of young members of the neo-fascist party Italian Social Movement. In the 1980s, de Benoist's ideas were introduced and promoted in West Germany by Neue Rechte philosopher Armin Mohler.

== Ideology ==
The ENR has gone through several re-syntheses since its emergence in the late 1960s. The last attempt at a common doctrine dates back to the manifesto "The New Right in the year 2000". Its leading ideas were "the critique of liberalism and of the commodification of the world; the rejection of individualism; an attachment to an organicist and communitarian view of society; the rejection of egalitarianism and of the various forms of monotheism from which it arose; the promotion of well-rooted collective identities and of the "right to difference"; the rejection of the nation-state as a form and the promotion of a federalist model that applies the principle of subsidiarity; and a view of international relations based on the idea of a multi-polar world in which Europe would be endowed with its own nationhood, apart from American omnipotence, which is designated the chief enemy of the European peoples."

While the term 'New Right' refers to an intellectual movement that emerged from several political organizations in France in 1968, it is sometimes confused with other terms such as the Alternative Right or Alt-Right. These political groups share common themes, such as a strong emphasis on nationalism and nationalist values, a critique of egalitarian principles found in central and left-leaning political ideologies, and a call to recognize individual differences, which are frequently classified by ethnic or civilizational distinctions.

According to Jean-Yves Camus and Nicolas Lebourg, the core idea of the ENR is their rejection of the "eradication of cultural identities", which has been caused in the ENR worldview by the principles of standardization and egalitarianism inherent to the concept of human rights. Alain de Benoist denounces the "ideology of sameness" as the idea that both commodities and human beings are increasingly seen as identical and interchangeable. According to him, the "greatest" danger in the world at the moment is the "progressive disappearance of diversity from the world", including biodiversity of animals, cultures and peoples. New Right thinker Tomislav Sunić emphasized Oswald Spengler's influence on the ENR, especially his assumption that mankind does not exist as such, that "each culture passes through various cycles", and that the concept of universal history is a non-sense, as there are only a "plurality of histories and their unequal distribution in time and space."

ENR thinkers believe that the West is living in an "interregnum" that will sooner or later give way to a new era in which their worldview would thrive. According to Roger Griffin, they developed, in response to this apparent post-fascist "parenthesis", a worldview founded on a "maze-way re-synthesis" of old and new ideological and ritual elements, combined in a "palingenetic metanarrative". The current political order is portrayed as needing to be abandoned or purged of its impurity, so that the "redemptive community" can leave the phase of liminal crisis to usher in the new era. Additionally, ENR leaders frequently invoke a legendary and mythical past they want to symbolically re-ground in the new society about to emerge, not in a spirit of nostalgia for the return of an ancient golden age, but rather "to create a rooted futurity, a new reality re-established on firm metaphysical foundations." This idea is particularly embodied in the concept of archeofuturism promoted by Guillaume Faye.

Some ENR thinkers, who belong to the Völkisch leaning of the movement, highlight race and ethnicity as the core dimensions of their concept of "identity". This has led to violent rejection of "difference", Faye calling for a "total ethnic war", and Pierre Vial for an "ethnic revolution" and a "war of liberation".

== Critics ==
Roger Griffin and Tamir Bar-On argue that the ENR is at the origin of a subtle strategy to reinvent the general framework of fascism while preserving the original fascist world view and ideas. They compare the metapolitical stance of ENR leaders to the strategy advocated by neo-fascist thinker Maurice Bardèche in his 1961 book What is Fascism?, where he averred that fascism could survive the 20th century in a new guise:

The famous fascist methods are constantly revised and will continue to be revised. More important than the mechanism is the idea which fascism has created for itself of man and freedom. […] With another name, another face, and with nothing which betrays the projection from the past, with the form of a child we do not recognize and the head of a young Medusa, the Order of Sparta will be reborn: and paradoxically it will, without doubt, be the last bastion of Freedom and the sweetness of living.

— Maurice Bardèche, Qu’est-ce que le fascisme? (Paris: Les Sept Couleurs, 1961), pp. 175–176.

According to historian Roger Woods, Neue Rechte philosopher Armin Mohler "illustrates the New Right tendency to separate what it regards as a pure version of fascism from the various attempts to put it into practice. He uncouples what he calls 'fascist style' from historical fascism, and on the basis of this distinction declares: 'I am a fascist'".

De Benoist has deliberately prioritized ideas and intellectual conversation above active political activity, declaring, "The value of an idea is not defined by its designation. Ideas do not have a set party-political residency. This metapolitical approach has had a considerable impact on current populist movements that want to move beyond traditional "right-wing" and "left-wing" designations to engage in alternative conversations. For most of the twentieth century, the New Right's policy of rejecting normal political techniques and popular ideas kept them on the intellectual edges. However, the introduction of the internet as a way of disseminating information has aided the wider transmission and rising impact of New Right beliefs. With the internet's ability to swiftly and widely disseminate information, parties like the Alt-Right have been able to accept and modify New Right ideologies. As a result, the internet has increased the exposure and effect of New Right views, allowing them to interact and combine with Alt-Right platforms.

== See also ==
- Alt-right
- Neue Rechte
- Nouvelle Droite
- Radical right (Europe)
