= Clemens Vollnhals =

German historian

Clemens Vollnhals (born 26 January 1956) is a German contemporary historian and a specialist of the Conservative Revolution, denazification, State security and political justice.

== Life and career ==
From 1976 to 1981, Vollnhals studied modern and contemporary history, social and economic history, as well as political science at LMU Munich. He earned a PhD in contemporary history in 1987 at the same university, after a doctoral thesis under the supervision of Friedrich Prinz on the denazification of the Protestant Church after WWII.

Since 1996, he has been Deputy Director of the Hannah Arendt Institute for the Research on Totalitarianism in Dresden. From 2003 to 2006, he was a lecturer at Charles University in Prague, and then until 2009 at Sofia University.

== Works ==
- Evangelische Kirche und Entnazifizierung 1945–1949. Die Last der nationalsozialistischen Vergangenheit (= Studien zur Zeitgeschichte. Band 36). München 1989 [Diss. München 1986].
- Entnazifizierung und Selbstreinigung im Urteil der evangelischen Kirche. Dokumente und Reflexionen 1945-1949 (= Studienbücher zur kirchlichen Zeitgeschichte. Band 8). München 1989.
- Entnazifizierung. Politische Säuberung und Rehabilitierung in den vier Besatzungszonen 1945–1949. München 1991.
- „In der DDR gibt es keine Zensur“. Evangelische Verlagsanstalt und die Praxis der Druckgenehmigung 1954–1989. Leipzig 1995 (with Siegfried Bräuer).
- Der Fall Havemann. Ein Lehrstück politischer Justiz. Berlin 1998 (Leseprobe, books.google.com).
