= Friedrich Hielscher =

German intellectual

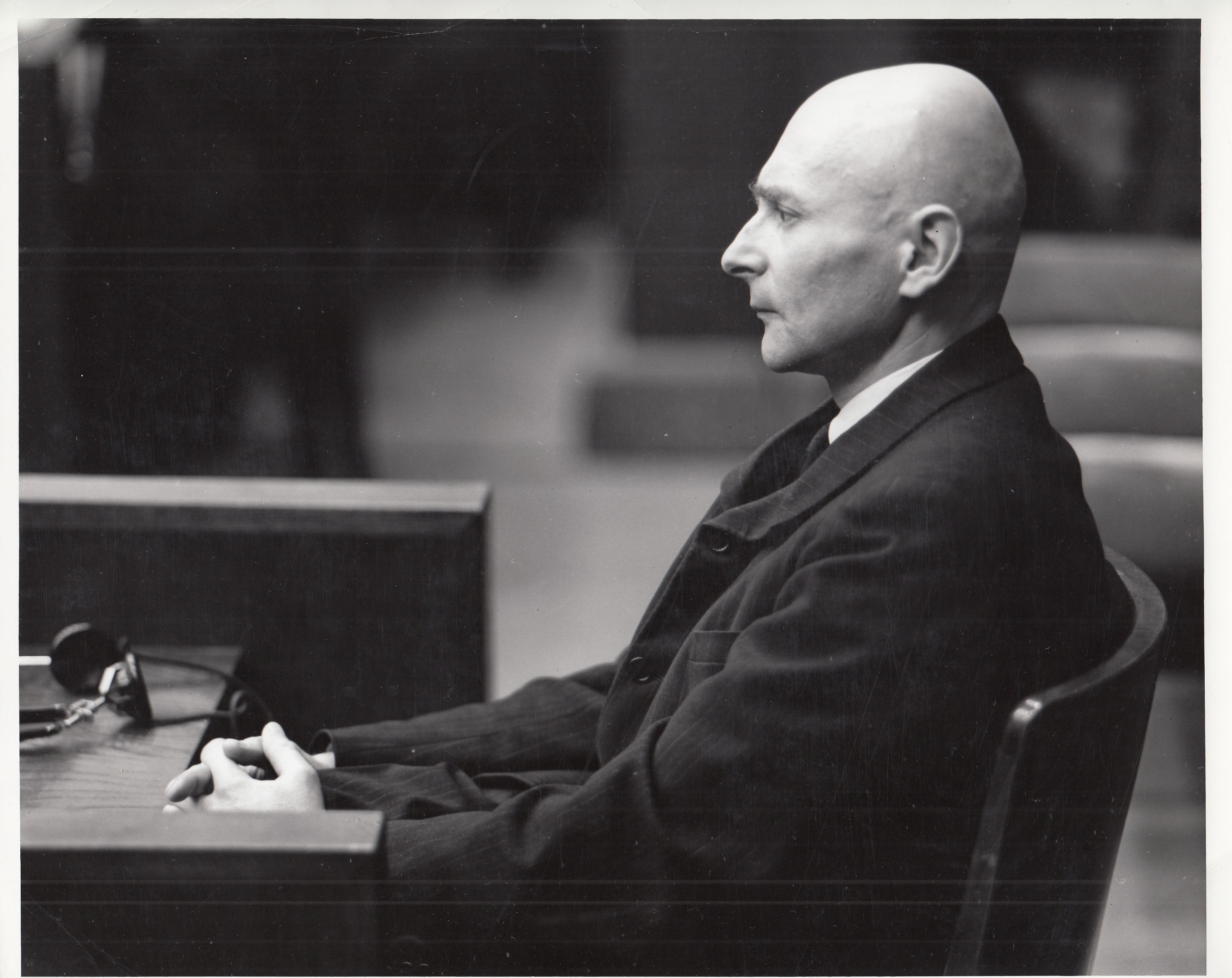
- Born: May 31, 1902; Plauen, Zwickau, Saxony, German Empire
- Died: March 6, 1990 (aged 87); Furtwangen im Schwarzwald, Freiburg, Baden-Württemberg, West Germany
- Occupation: Founder of Unabhängige Freikirche

Friedrich Hielscher (31 May 1902 – 6 March 1990) was a German intellectual involved in the Conservative Revolutionary movement during the Weimar Republic and in the German resistance during the Nazi era. He was the founder of an esoteric or Neopagan movement, the Unabhängige Freikirche (UFK, "Independent Free Church"), which he headed from 1933 until his death.

== Early life ==
Hielscher was born the eldest of three children to Fritz Hielscher and Gertrud Hielscher née Erdmenger in Plauen, Vogtland, at the time part of the Kingdom of Saxony. Baptized into the Lutheran Church as Fritz Johannes, he later changed his name to Hans Friedrich and finally to Friedrich.

Hielscher joined a Freikorps on June 10, 1919. He left his unit in 1920 due to his refusal to participate in the 1920 Kapp-Putsch, which he regarded as "reactionary".

Although his religious mother encouraged him to study theology, from 1920 he studied law in Berlin, where he joined the schlagende Corps Normania Berlin. He studied for his doctorate under the jurist Otto Koellreutter, culminating in his 1928 dissertation, "Die Selbstherrlichkeit: Versuch einer Darsterstellung des deutschen Rechtsgrundbegriffs" (Self-Aggrandisement: An Attempt to Present the German Legal Concept). This thesis was an effort to define the legal foundations of the German Right around the philosophy of Friedrich Nietzsche, Max Weber, and Oswald Spengler.

He became politically active in the German People's Party, a conservative liberal party and precursor of the modern Free Democratic Party. Joining the DVP's "Reichsklub," he regularly visited sessions in the Reichstag, an experience that turned him against parliamentary politics and his attack of the Reichstag as a "Phantom Assembly" representing secret financial interests rather than the German nation.

== Conservative Revolutionary movement ==
Hielscher was influenced by the Conservative Revolution movement, especially Arthur Moeller van den Bruck. After reading The Decline of the West, he contacted Oswald Spengler and visited his apartment in Munich, but was rejected by the historian.

Through their mutual friend, August Winnig, Hielscher was introduced to Ernst Jünger in 1926. Jünger held Hielscher in high esteem and credited him with his own disenchantment with technology (tecknik). Following Ernst von Salomon, who named Hielscher "Bogumil", Jünger nicknamed Hielscher "Bodo" or "Bogo" as an homage to Hielscher's interest in Gnosticism.

Hielscher's first publication was an essay entitled "Intrigue and Artistry" in Jünger's magazine Standarte-Arminius, in December 1926. Jünger entrusted Hielscher with editorship of his magazine Der Vormarsch (The Advance) in April 1928.

Hielscher abandoned Der Vormarsch to launch his own journal, Das Reich, in the summer of 1929. Both journals were banned by the Hitler regime in 1933.

== Das Reich ==
In 1931, Hielscher published his vision of an ethnic German Reich in his magnum opus, Das Reich. Hielscher proposed this as a "political theology of the Empire", harmonizing his spiritual and political views into a new vision of Deutschheit (Germanness). He argued against a racial or biological definition of the German nation, extolling "the community of a race of the spirit" over a biological emphasis he condemned as "entirely materialistic". Deeper "spiritual" values were not genetic: "Lineage is not a question of descent but of mental attitude."

He was inspired by Friedrich Schiller, who consoled himself during the French occupation by recalling that the values of "Germandom" lay outside the political sphere and thus indestructible. Hielscher proposed that the "Myth" of das Reich could be found in the merger of "Power" and "Inwardness", which he regarded as "divine totality". He combined philosophical influences from the "chain of Inwardness" - Meister Eckhart, Martin Luther, Goethe, and Nietzsche - which he saw as corresponding to an external "chain of Power": Theodoric, Heinrich VI, Gustavus Adolphus, Frederick the Great, and Bismarck.

Hielscher's concept of Reich was also inspired by Stefan George's belief in a "Secret Germany" (Geheimes Deutschland), a mystical and ethnic essentialist argument for a spiritual and cultural potential held by the German people and a German nation which existed in potentia but which had been prevented from realization in the history of the Holy Roman Empire. This was an inner, positive force rooted in the ethical and moral imperatives of "the spirit", and not imposed from above by either social classes or politics. George's vision influenced German resistance to Nazism, particularly Claus von Stauffenberg.

== Anti-Colonialism ==
As with other members of the Conservative Revolution, Hielscher advocated for anti-colonialist movements as the natural allies of Germany in its own struggle against the supposed powers behind Versailles. He argued for an alliance with Russia while opposing Communism. In his own magazine Das Reich, Hielscher gave an audience to anti-imperialist liberation movements under the heading "Vormarsch der Volker" (Rise of the Peoples). These meetings were personally condemned by the Nordicist race theorist Alfred Rosenberg.

== Theology ==
Hielscher was a member of the Evangelical Church in Germany until 1924. In 1933, he founded the Unabhängige Freikirche ("Independent Free Church", UFK), a non-Christian religious institution designed to put into practice his theological ideas. The UFK combined panentheism with paganism and nationalism. In Hielscher's theology, God is external to the universe, or the universe contained within God. Within the universe are the "Twelve Divine Messengers" (zwölf göttliche Boten), six male and six female, identified with the pagan deities, specifically with the gods of Germanic paganism. Hielscher elaborates the personality of three out of these twelve deities in particular, describing them as "divine couple", also "king and queen", named Wode and Frigga, and the "god of Easter" (Ostergott), named Fro. The remaining nine Messengers are treated much more briefly, or not at all; they include Freya, Loki and Sigyn. The principles of his religious system are elaborated in twelve pamphlets (Leitbriefe) written in 1956 and 1957 and distributed to his adherents. This "pagan catechism" of Hielscher's were edited by Bahn (2009). The religious doctrine of Hielscher's UFK consists of a syncretism of monotheistic Christianity, panentheism as advocated by Goethe, and polytheistic reconstruction related to other currents of Germanic mysticism at the time (such as the groups led by Jakob Wilhelm Hauer and Ludwig Fahrenkrog).

== Resistance movement ==
Like some conservatives of 1920s Germany, Hielscher was opposed to Nazism and its form of racism. While his early writings were openly nationalist, he moved away from German nationalism after 1933 and participated in the underground German resistance.

Under the Nazi regime of 1933 to 1945, he advocated a clandestine approach to resistance, attempting to place his adherents in key positions where they could contribute to the ultimate downfall of the regime. Hielscher's UFK was not itself a cell of the German resistance, but several of its members were at the same time active in such. Via Franz Maria Liedig and August Winnig, the UFK was well-connected with the resistance movement. Hielscher convinced several of his followers to seek positions within the regime, including intelligence (Abwehr), military command, Ahnenerbe and police (SS-Reichssicherheitshauptamt), from which positions they managed to protect some of those persecuted by the Nazi regime.

Hielscher was arrested in 1944 in connection with the failed 20 July plot to assassinate Hitler. He was released after Ahnenerbe director Wolfram Sievers interceded on his behalf.

When Sievers was accused of war crimes at the Doctors' Trial at Nuremberg, Hielscher in turn interceded for him, stating that Sievers was part of his clandestine resistance. Sievers was nevertheless condemned to death and executed in 1948.

Hielscher was criticized by his own followers for his leadership, the failure of his concept of clandestine resistance, and his attempts to defend Sievers. Disillusioned, and disappointed with his failure to save Sievers from execution, Hielscher publicly announced his retirement from all political activities, resolving to restrict his efforts to the purely religious.

== Life after 1945 ==
After the war, Hielscher retired from all public office. He lived with his wife Gertrud in Marburg and Münnerstadt and from 1964 at the secluded Rimprechtshof near Schönwald in the Black Forest.

He was the editor of the Deutsche Corpszeitung during the 1960s, where he published a number of essays on academic fencing.

Hielscher continued to lead the UFK until his death in Furtwangen in 1990.

== Bibliography ==
- 1928, Die Selbstherrlichkeit: Versuch einer Darsterstellung des deutschen Rechtsgrundbegriffs, Vormarsch-Verlag, Berlin.
- 1931, Das Reich, Hermann & Schulze, Leipzig.
- 1954, Fünfzig Jahre unter Deutschen, Rowohlt, Hamburg 1954 (autobiography)
- 1959, Zuflucht der Sünder, Dionysos-Verlag Thulcke & Schulze, Berlin.
- Peter Bahn (ed.), Die Leitbriefe der Unabhängigen Freikirche, Telesma, Schwielowsee, 2009 (online recension).
- Ernst Jünger / Friedrich Hielscher. Briefwechsel, Klett-Cotta, 2005, ISBN 3-608-93617-3 (edition of correspondence with Ernst Jünger).

== See also ==
- Esotericism in Germany and Austria
