= Louis Dupeux =

French historian

Louis Dupeux (28 July 1931 – 20 May 2002) was a French historian who specialized in the study of the Conservative Revolution and National Bolshevism during the Weimar Republic.

== Life and career ==
Dupeux was a professor at the Robert Schuman University and a research at the Centre d'études germaniques ("Centre of Germanic studies") of Strasbourg.

== Study of the Conservative Revolution ==
Dupeux was one of the first specialists and precursors in the study of the German Conservative Revolution.

While Dupeux admitted that the Conservative Revolution relied more on "feeling, images and myths" than on analysis and conceptualization and recognized the necessity to distinguish several leanings inside of it, he considered the movement to be an intellectual project with its own consistent logic, namely the striving for an Intellektueller Macht ("intellectual power") to promote new conservative and revolutionary ideas in wide society. He described the Conservative Revolution as a "German pre-fascism."

Dupeux saw five lines of divisions that can be drawn inside the Conservative Revolutionaries: the small farmers were different from the cultural pessimists and the "pseudo-moderns", who belonged for the most part to the middle class; while the proponent of an "organic" society were opposed to those of an "organised" society. A third division split the supporters of political and cultural transformations and those of a concrete social revolution, as far as challenging economic freedom and private property; while the fourth rift resided in the question of the Drang nach Osten ("drive to the East") and the attitude to adopt towards Bolshevik Russia, escorted by the debate on the place of Germany between the so-called "senile" West and "young and barbaric" Orient; the last division being a deep opposition between the Völkischer and the pre-fascist thinkers.

== Works ==
- Stratégie communiste et dynamique conservatrice. Essai sur les différents sens de l'expression « National-bolchevisme » en Allemagne, sous la République de Weimar (1919-1933), (Lille, Service de reproduction des thèses de l'Université) Paris, Librairie H. Champion, 1976.
- National bolchevisme : stratégie communiste et dynamique conservatrice, 2 vol., Paris, H. Champion, 1979.
- Histoire culturelle de l'Allemagne (1919-1960) (RFA), Paris, PUF, 1989. ISBN 2-13-042573-9
- (dir.), La « Révolution conservatrice » allemande sous la république de Weimar, Actes du colloque, 20-21 mars 1981 et 15-17 mars 1984, Strasbourg; organisé par le Groupe d'étude de la Révolution conservatrice, Paris, Éditions Kimé, « Histoire des idées, théorie politique et recherches en sciences sociales », 1992. ISBN 2-908212-18-8
- Aspects du fondamentalisme national en Allemagne de 1890 à 1945 et essais complémentaires, Strasbourg, Presses universitaires de Strasbourg, « Les mondes germaniques », 2001. ISBN 2-86820-184-9
