= Anti-Nazi Freedom Movement =

The Anti-Nazi Freedom Movement (German: Antinationalsozialistische Freiheitsbewegung, abbreviated ANFB) was a German anti-fascist organization based in Colombia during the Second World War. The group was set up in 1942 by Erich Arendt and Otto Weiland as a united front initiative. It was formed at a meeting at Barranquilla airport and the residence of Walter Rosenthal in Barranquilla in March 1942.

ANFB gathered trade unionists, liberal democrats, social democrats and communists, albeit dominated by the latter two groups. Leading figures in Bogotá were the communist Arendt and the social democratic trade unionist Otto Priller. Another prominent figure was Conrad Togger, a bourgeois opponent to Hitler.

Weiland served as chairman of ANFB. Arendt served as the secretary of ANFB. Walter Rosenthal was the leader of ANFB in Barranquilla on the northern coast. ANFB published Europa Libre ('Free Europe').

ANFB was banned in January 1943, with Colombian authorities charging its members with disloyalty to their host country. In November 1943 the Democratic Committee for a Free Germany was founded as a continuation of the ANFB.
