= Armin Mohler =

Swiss far-right political philosopher (1920–2003)

- Born: 12 April 1920; Basel, Switzerland
- Died: 4 July 2003 (aged 83); Munich, Germany

Education
- Education: University of Basel

Philosophical work
- Era: Contemporary philosophy
- Region: Western philosophy: German philosophy
- School: Neue Rechte (European New Right)
- Notable ideas: Conservative Revolution

Armin Mohler (12 April 1920 – 4 July 2003) was a Swiss political philosopher and journalist, known for his works on the Conservative Revolution. He is widely seen as the father of the Neue Rechte (New Right), the German branch of the European New Right.

== Education and World War II ==
Armin Mohler was born in Basel, Switzerland, on 12 April 1920, the second child of a Swiss railway official. After passing his Abitur in 1938, he studied art history, German studies and philosophy at the University of Basel. As a student, he wrote articles on art history and film criticism for the Baseler Nationalzeitung. At that time, he espoused left radical and pacifist views, but the reading of authors like Oswald Spengler, Friedrich Nietzsche, Thomas Mann, and Ernst Jünger, as well as his military service in the Swiss army, increasingly eroded his ideological certainties. Germany's invasion of the Soviet Union in 1941–42 led to a political "awakening experience". Enlisted during World War II, he deserted in February 1942 and crossed the border with Germany in order to join the Waffen-SS and fight against communism. He underwent training, but his application was later turned down.

At the end of 1942 he returned to Basel and was sentenced to a year in prison for illegal border crossing and dereliction of duty. After his release and recovery from tuberculosis, Mohler devoted himself to his dissertation. In 1950, he published Die Konservative Revolution in Deutschland 1918-1932 (The Conservative Revolution in Germany, 1918-1932), the product of his doctoral thesis under the supervision of German-Swiss philosopher Karl Jaspers. The work helped spread the popularity of the concept of "Conservative Revolution" to a wider audience.

== Career ==
From 1949 to 1953, Mohler served as Ernst Jünger's private secretary. Between 1953 and 1961, he worked as a foreign correspondent in Paris, mainly for the newspapers Die Tat, Die Zeit, Die Furche and Christ und Welt. There, he became enamored of Gaullism. Under the pseudonym "Michael Hintermwald", he also published in Gerhard Frey's far-right newspaper Deutschen National-Zeitung. Mohler moved to Munich in 1961 to work for the Carl Friedrich von Siemens Foundation. He then served as its managing director from 1964 until its retirement in 1985. Mohler identified Franz Josef Strauss, a Bavarian Christian social union politician, as hopeful right-wing candidate within the European tradition of Gaullism. Mohler's hope was, that Strauss would lead a right-wing national-revolutionary mass movement. During the Spiegel affair, Strauss did acknowledge, that he had read Mohler, and that his Gaullist stance informed the continuous confrontation with the political left in Bavaria.

In 1967, Mohler received the Konrad Adenauer Prize for his work in journalism.

In the 1980s Mohler actively promoted French Nouvelle Droite philosopher Alain de Benoist. He wrote the introduction to de Benoist's Kulturrevolution von rechts (Cultural Revolution from the Right) when it appeared in West Germany in 1985. Mohler had been introduced to French far-right ideas during his time in France.

== Death and legacy ==
Mohler remained an unrepentant admirer of Italian and Spanish fascism until the end of his life. Mohler died on 4 July 2003 in Munich. His eulogy was given by the then 32-year-old Götz Kubitschek, who soon became one of the most important German New Right figures.

In 2025, the historian Maik Tändler published a book about Mohler and his influence, Armin Mohler und die intellektuelle Rechte in der Bonner Republik (lit. 'Armin Mohler and the Intellectual Right in the Bonn Republic').

== Writings and ideas ==
=== Conservative Revolution ===
Mohler's seminal work is his book Die Konservative Revolution in Deutschland 1918-1932 ("The Conservative Revolution in Germany, 1918-1932"), which initially was his doctoral thesis. There, he tried to unearth Weimar Republic right-wing thought and tradition apart from and alternative to Nazism. The most crucial thinkers of the Conservative Revolution to him were Ernst Jünger, Oswald Spengler, Carl Schmitt, Ernst Niekisch, Hans Blüher, and Thomas Mann (before his turn to liberalism).

In the words of historian Roger Woods, "Armin Mohler’s long-term project after 1945 was to portray the Conservative Revolution as a distinctive intellectual movement which was distorted by the Nazis and which, in its pure form, had a role to play as a model for Germany’s future. Mohler presents the Conservative Revolution as theory, and National Socialism as practice, and he asks to what extent a theory can be made responsible for a practice which varied from it."

=== Neue Rechte ===
According to Michael Minkenberg, Mohler's ideas owed more to the Nouvelle Droite associated with GRECE than the Ostpolitik-derived ideas of a strong German state associated with contemporaries like Robert Spaemann and Gerd-Klaus Kaltenbrunner.

One of his favourite targets was the so-called "Vergangenheitsbewältigung", which he criticized in several books. That argument involved the claim that postwar Germany should 'step out of Hitler's shadow'. It was thus claimed that Mohler was a forerunner of Ernst Nolte and associated thinkers, who were involved in the Historikerstreit.

A neopagan, Mohler viewed conservatism and Christianity as mutually exclusive and argued that Christians by necessity must embrace left-wing politics. This position met considerable opposition.

=== Fascism ===
Mohler's notion of Conservative Revolution has been described by some scholars like Roger Griffin as a form of fascism. According to Woods, Mohler "illustrates the New Right tendency to separate what it regards as a pure version of fascism from the various attempts to put it into practice. He uncouples what he calls 'fascist style' from historical fascism, and on the basis of this distinction declares: 'I am a fascist'".

== Political activism ==
Mohler supported conservative politician Franz Josef Strauß and the Christian Social Union of Bavaria after his stint with the Siemens Foundation. He also backed The Republicans for a brief time, serving as an adviser to its leader Franz Schönhuber, but saw no future for them. In 1983, he founded the Deutschlandrat (Council for Germany) with the support of a number of conservative university professors, but it never became a viable institution.

== Published works ==
- Die Konservative Revolution in Deutschland 1918–1932. Ein Handbuch. (Zugleich Dissertation Basel 1949), Ares-Verlag, Graz 2005, ISBN 3-902475-02-1
- Die Schleife. Dokumente zum Weg von Ernst Jünger. Arche, Zürich 1955; Nachdruck: Edition Antaios, Bad Vilbel 2001, ISBN 3-935063-15-6
- Die französische Rechte. Der Kampf um Frankreichs Ideologienpanzer. Isar, München 1958
- Die fünfte Republik. Was steht hinter de Gaulle? Piper, München 1963
- Was die Deutschen fürchten. Seewald, Stuttgart 1965
- Vergangenheitsbewältigung. Von der Läuterung zur Manipulation. Seewald, Stuttgart 1968
- Sex und Politik. Rombach, Freiburg im Breisgau 1972
- Von rechts gesehen. Seewald, Stuttgart 1974
- Tendenzwende für Fortgeschrittene. Criticón, München 1978
- Vergangenheitsbewältigung. Oder wie man den Krieg nochmals verliert. 3. translated: A. Sinus, Krefeld 1981, ISBN 3-88289-014-2
- Der Nasenring. Im Dickicht der Vergangenheitsbewältigung. 3. A. Langen Müller, München 1991, ISBN 3-7844-2332-9
- Liberalenbeschimpfung. Drei politische Traktate. Heitz & Höffkes, Essen 1990, ISBN 3-926650-90-7
- With Dieter Stein: Im Gespräch mit Alain de Benoist. Junge Freiheit, Freiburg im Breisgau 1993, ISBN 3-929886-00-6
- Georges Sorel. Erzvater der Konservativen Revolution. Eine Einführung. Antaios, Bad Vilbel 2000, ISBN 3-935063-01-6
- Der Streifzug. Blicke auf Bilder, Bücher und Menschen. Antaios, Dresden 2001, ISBN 3-935063-16-4
- Das Gespräch. Über Rechte, Linke und Langweiler. Antaios, Dresden 2001, ISBN 3-935063-17-2
- Lieber Chef... Briefe an Ernst Jünger 1947–1961 (edited by Erik Lehnert). Antaios 2016, ISBN 978-3-935063-29-6
- Der faschistische Stil. Antaios, Schnellroda 2020, ISBN 978-3-944422-67-1
