= Ewald Banse =

German geographer (1883–1953)

Ewald Banse (born 23 May 1883 in Braunschweig – died 31 October 1953 in Braunschweig) was a German geographer.

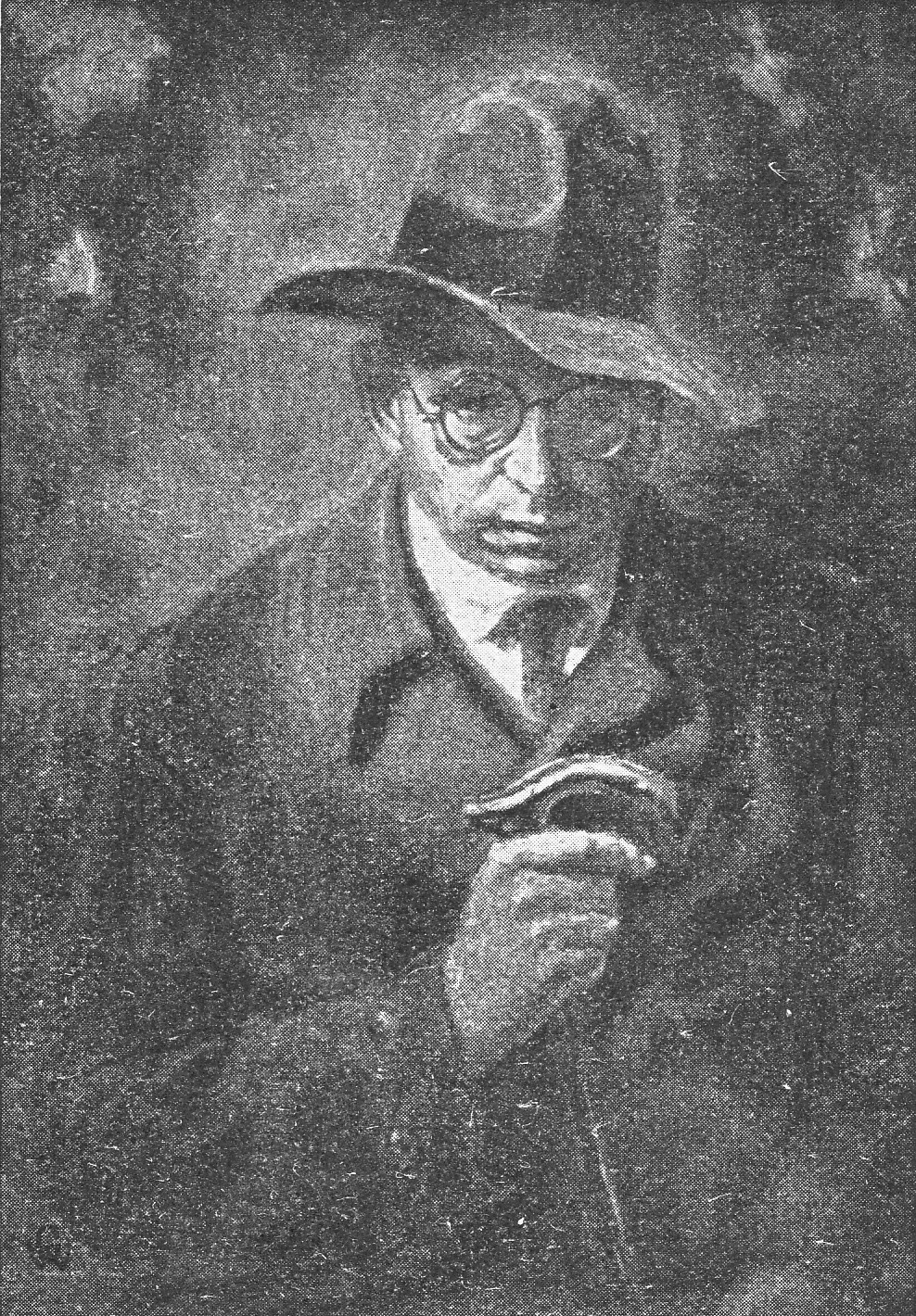
Ewald Banse, painted by Fritz Flebbe

Banse was a professor at the technical college in his native city. Allied propaganda cited Banse's main work, Raum und Volk im Weltkriege ("Space and People in the World War") (1925), as proof of Germany's war lust. Banse advocated the union of all areas settled by Germans in a Great German Reich extending far beyond the 1914 frontiers. To achieve this he expressly demanded military action. The warrior was to be the carrier of the coming rule of "Nordic nobility".
