= Volkstum =

Volkstum (lit. "folkdom" or "folklore", though the meaning is wider than the common usage of the term folklore) is the entirety of utterances of a Volk or of an ethnic minority over its lifetime, expressing a "Volkscharakter" which the people of such an ethnicity allegedly have in common. It was the defining idea of the Völkisch movement.

German nationalists coined the term in the context of Germany's "Wars of Liberation" of 1813 to 1814, in marked and conscious opposition to ideals of the French Revolution such as universal human rights. This sense of the word is now criticised in academia, though it is still in use in the protection of ethnic minorities and is a current legal standard in Germany and Austria.

== History ==
=== Origins ===
In the Age of Enlightenment the adjective volkstümlich usually meant the cultural achievements of uneducated Germans as well as popular culture. The Volksdichtung (People's Poetry) was 'high' literature, the culture of distinction, and partly devalued the elite education and partly idealised it. The concept was not yet tied to a certain nation, and attributed some of its characteristics to non-German culture.

Justus Möser (1720–1794), Johann Gottfried von Herder (1744–1803), Johann Georg Hamann (1730–1788) and other German Romantics gradually increased the concept by their actions into an unspoiled, organic, person liable closed and eternal "People's character" (Volkscharakter) and charged against the monarchies then dominating Germany. Möser already bordered on being the "Vater der Volkskunde" (Father of Ethnology) the Deutschtum against the cosmopolitanism of the Enlightenment and against the French Revolution.

Friedrich Ludwig Jahn (Deutsches Volksthum 1810) is considered the inventor of the noun Volkstum. He translated the foreign word Nation and thus moved it into an "unerring something" in every Volk. For him and for Ernst Moritz Arndt (1769–1860) and Johann Gottlieb Fichte (1762–1814), German Volkstum was a revolutionary source not only against the foreign domination of Napoleonic France, but also against dynasties and the church, with the word Enlightenment becoming less and less used. For all three thinkers, the idea of a uniform anti-Enlightenment position with an opposed Volkstum was already linked with Antisemitism. Arndt wrote in Der Rhein, Deutschlands Strom, aber nicht Deutschlands Grenze 1813:

Cursed just by humanity and cosmopolitanism, making her prahlet! Right across the world those Jews sense that they must praise us as the highest summits of human formation!

He strictly rejected Jewish emancipation, whilst seeing it as every man's natural right and goal, and in particular of the German people to the whole human race was living. He then summarised the concept as exclusive to those on the inside, not as being outside and expansive.

=== German Empire ===
The founding of the German Reich in 1871, as a "Kleindeutsche Lösung" under Prussian domination, only fulfilled part of the German nationalists' objectives, wishing and struggling as they did for the unification of all German speakers in a single nation state.

The more Volkstum concept was now part of a nationalist ideology and political propaganda. It often served as a patriotic or visionary binding-agent to cover over or overcome the real contradictions inside and outside the German empire: for example, by providing a "Volkstumskampf", it summoned a corporate-agrarian Volksgemeinschaft or ideal community as the key features of Volkstum, though these did not actually exist. It was the term of choice for every figure wishing to turn to an irrational feeling and definition of unity, against both enemies inside and outside the Reich.

While the Brothers Grimm had not yet distinguished between Gemeinschaft (community) and Gesellschaft (society), Ferdinand Tönnies (1855–1936) noted in his 1887 work Gemeinschaft und Gesellschaft that the two were mutually exclusive – he defined "community" as a form of mutual affirmation of the people in themselves as in their resources, their respective communities (such as their family) but as an understood purpose – as opposed to its mutual form as "society" in which the individual himself was a purpose, with a 'community' (e.g. a corporation) watching over his means. 'Community' would in his terms be felt by children as "the permanent and genuine" against the "temporary and apparent cohabitation" of 'society'. This was directed against the Marxism of social democracy, whose "scientific" reasoned ideal of the classless society was felt by Tönnies to be unworkable. He was very sceptical about a concept such as "Volksgemeinschaft" – in the political sphere, he held that the ancient polis, or the medieval Hanseatic city as its most pronounced form, little more than which could be expected by modern people.

Underscored by the context of Wilhelmine militarism and imperialism on the eve of the First World War, however, Heinrich Claß (chairman of the Alldeutscher Verband) in contrast defined Volkstum as national assertiveness and "Menschlichkeit" (humanity):

This so-called 'humanity' may apply again if we are politically, morally, medically and culturally reformed, and then they will always find their [only] limits will be the bill for which each victim will be bought for the health of the Volk.

He also took the "German disease" to be the German Jewish minority, who for him embodied all the moral values and ethnic roots of "corrosive" internationalism.

During the war the "Deutsche Volkstum" and "Deutschtum", particularly in universities, again became popular, in the sense of chauvinism. In "Deutschen Reden in schwerer Zeit" (German Speeches in a black time), 35 Berlin professors spoke out against much degeneration and foreigners, calling the World War a "Reinigungsbad" and the "fountain cellar of a new culture". Gustav Röthen, for example, saw it as the mass killings of the "sacred flame, faithful to the world-historical mission of the German people against barbarism and sub-culture".

=== Third Reich ===
Under National Socialism Volkstum was aggressively interpreted. Adolf Hitler, in Mein Kampf, put Volkstum alongside race, "because the Volkstum, better than Race, lies not just in the speech, but in the blood."

After the "Machtergreifung", various university and non-university groups oriented towards völkisch and volkstum-politics were linked to cross-disciplinary "research communities", into which "Volk history" and "Ostforschung" were integrated, closely connected to the Nazi state and party. Their specialist disciplines became programmes with more state backing and funding than ever before. The concept of an "ethnic Volkstum" was divided into "Volksgenossen" (Volk comrades) and "Volksfeinde" (Volk enemies), so that the Volkstum concept was revised and became more strongly oriented towards racist and warlike solutions.

Above all, the Prussian archivist Albert Brackmann advocated and led the Gleichschaltung of the Nordostdeutschen Forschungsgemeinschaft (Northeast German Research Foundation), which centrally directed research on East German history and controlled numerous projects on the issues of border demarcation and population policy. The young historians of Königsberg supported the "Ostpolitik" (Eastern Policy) of the NSDAP, for no academic elite had emerged within the party itself. After 1937 the Norddeutsche and Ostdeutsche Forschungsgemeinschafts combined as a single large state-funded research organization. The impact of Volkstum historians was decisive in the use of their expertise in the Nazi ethnic policies in the conquered areas of eastern Europe from 1939 onwards. They drafted numerous maps and statistics, serving Nazi planning as the basis of its settlement and population policy in Poland, the Baltic states, Ukraine and Belarus.

The Nazis during the war made repeated efforts to propagate Volkstum ("racial consciousness"), pamphlets were issued that enjoined all German women to avoid sexual relations with all foreign workers brought to Germany as a danger to their blood.

The policy of "Eindeutschung" propagated and legitimated by the Volkstum historians, which made so-called German installations as ethnically and culturally, also favoured the Holocaust, even if they did not conceive it and were not directly involved in it.

=== Since 1945 ===
After 1945 the concept was first used in its political sense in Germany as an expression of nationalist ideology and avoided by neutral words like Bevölkerung (population). Bertolt Brecht formulated it as: "Das Volk ist nicht tümlich." ("The Volk is not tümlich.") In the GDR, the term Volk – without the suffix -tum – expressed the supposed conformity of the population with the SED and the state in word combinations such as Volksdemokratie (people's republic), Volkspolizei (people's police) and Volksarmee (people's army). By contrast, a later opposition slogan was "Wir sind das Volk" ("We are the people").

In Austria the concept was equally used, but in a multi-ethnic monarchy. Thus, in the 1976 National Minorities Act (Volksgruppengesetz), the term Volksgruppe served as a rough synonym for "national minority", according to the Framework Convention for the Protection of National Minorities of the Council of Europe. Section 6 in the German Federal Expellee Law (Bundesvertriebenengesetz) also uses the expression. The legislature of Switzerland defined Volkstum, at the time of ratification of the Framework Convention, as "inspired by the desire [...] to commonly preserve what relates to their common identity, including their culture, their traditions, their religion, or their language." In accordance with this, Volkstum is primarily used for the self-perception of a population group. In its popular sense (close to the usual English sense of folklore), the term occasionally denotes regional traditions of ethnic minorities within Germany, or ethnically German minorities abroad (e.g., the Volkstum of the Sorbs, Frisians, Danube Swabians, Romanian Germans). In recent times, it regained currency within the term volkstümliche Musik, a popularizing folk genre close to Schlager.

At the turn of the 21 century, Volkstum remained a German legal and juridical standard concerning the remigration and naturalization of Aussiedler and Spätaussiedler individuals in the Bundesvertriebenengesetz. In Austria, it remained as a criterion within the Volksgruppengesetz denoting protected ethnic minorities.

== See also ==
- Volksgeist
- Reich Commissioner for the Consolidation of German Nationhood
- National identity
