= Ludwig Woltmann =

German anthropologist and philosopher (1871–1907)

- Born: February 18, 1871; Solingen, Westphalia, Germany
- Died: January 30, 1907 (aged 35)
- Occupations: Zoologist; anthropologist

Ludwig Woltmann (18 February 1871 – 30 January 1907) was a German anthropologist, zoologist and neo-Kantian.

He studied medicine and philosophy, and obtained doctorates in the two fields from the University of Freiburg in 1896.

Ludwig Woltmann falls in the spiritual and ideological history of the 20th century with the racial theorists Arthur de Gobineau and Houston Stewart Chamberlain, in particular in terms of his racial theoretical thought. In his book Die Germanen und die Renaissance in Italien (1905), he argued that the emergence of the Renaissance in Italy was led not by the descendants of the Romans, but by the Germanic tribes who had subdued Italy during the Middle Ages. His ideas were mainly published by the journal Political-Anthropological Review (1902–1907) and in the book Political Anthropology written in 1903. This and two other of his books were published in a 1936 Otto Reche anthology.

== Publications ==
- System des moralischen Bewußtseins, mit besonderer Darlegung der Verhältnisses der kritischen Philosophie zu Darwinismus und Socialismus, 1898
- Die Darwinsche Theorie und der Sozialismus. Ein Beitrag zur Naturgeschichte der menschlichen Gesellschaft, 1899
- Der historische Materialismus. Darstellung und Kritik der marxistischen Weltanschauung, 1900
- Pilgerfahrt. Skizzen aus Palästina, 1900
- Die Stellung der Sozialdemokratie zur Religion, 1901
- Politische Anthropologie. Eine Untersuchung über den Einfluß der Descendenztheorie auf die Lehre von der politischen Entwicklung der Völker, 1903
- Sind die Goten in Italien untergangen?, 1903
- Rassenpsychologie und Culturgeschichte, 1904
- Der physische Typus Immanuel Kants, 1904
- Ein Lehrbuch der Anthropologie. Politisch-Anthrop. Rev., Leipzig, 1905, 4, 8–16.
- Die Germanen und die Renaissance in Italien, 1905
- Arier - Germanen - Rassenpsychologie. Politisch-Anthrop. Rev., Leipzig, 1905, 4, 379–388.
- Marxismus und Rassentheorie Politisch-Anthrop. Rev., Leipzig, 1905, 4, 268–280.
- Die Rassen- und Klassentheorie in der Soziologie. Politisch-Anthrop. Rev., Leipzig, 1905, 4, 417–424.
- Neueste Literatur zur Rassentheorie Politisch-Anthrop. Rev., Leipzig, 1905, 4, 484–502
- Anhänger und Gegner der Rassetheorie. Politisch-Anthrop. Rev., Leipzig, 1906, 5, 257–268.
- Die Bedeutung des Milieus für die Rassenentfaltung. Politisch-Anthrop. Rev., Leipzig, 1906, 4, 537–543
- Zur Germanenfrage in der italienischen-Renaissance, 1906
- Die Germanen in Spanien, 1906
- Die Germanen in Frankreich. Eine Untersuchung über den Einfluß der germanischen Rasse auf die Geschichte und Kultur Frankreichs, 1907
- Bemerkungen zur Rassetheorie. Politisch-Anthrop. Rev., Leipzig, 1907, 5, 673–682.
- Germanische Rasse und romanische Kultur. Politisch-Anthrop. Rev., Leipzig, 1907, 5, 545–552.
- Klemm und Gobineau, 1908
- Jugendgedichte, 1924

== Literature ==
- Wolfhard Hammer, The Life and Work of the Physician and Social Anthropologist Ludwig Woltmann. Univ. Diss, Mainz 1979.
- Jürgen Mixing, The Political Philosophy of Ludwig Woltmann. In the Field of Tension between Kantianism's Historical Materialism and Social Darwinism, Bonn 1975
- Sebastian Pella, The Social Darwinism-bred Theoretical Thinking in Ludwig Woltmann's Artwork, Political Anthropology, Bottrop 2009.
