= Roger Woods =

British historian

Roger Woods (born 1949) is a British contemporary historian who specialises on 20th-century German political history.

== Life and career ==
Woods is Emeritus Professor in the Department of German studies at the University of Nottingham.

From 2004 to 2006, he was Chairman of the University Council of Modern Languages, and then Provost and CEO of University of Nottingham Ningbo China from 2007 to 2010.

== Works ==
- The Conservative Revolution in the Weimar Republic. Palgrave Macmillan, 1996. 173 pp. ISBN 978-0333650141
- Germany's New Right as Culture and Politics. Palgrave Macmillan, 2007. 183 pp. ISBN 978-1349353019
- Opposition in the GDR under Honecker, 1971-85: An Introduction and Documentation. Palgrave Macmillan, 2014. 257pp. ISBN 978-1349080342
