= 102 Years in the Heart of Europe =

- Written by: Björn Cederberg
- Directed by: Jesper Wachtmeister
- Starring: Ernst Jünger; Björn Cederberg; Mikael Persbrandt
- Country of origin: Sweden
- Original languages: German; Swedish

Production
- Producer: Cecilia Cederström
- Cinematography: Per Källberg; Jesper Wachtmeister
- Editor: Jesper Wachtmeister
- Running time: 56 minutes
- Production companies: Martin & Co. Filmproduktion

Original release
- Release: 15 April 1998

102 Years in the Heart of Europe: A Portrait of Ernst Jünger (Swedish: 102 år i hjärtat av Europa) is a Swedish documentary film from 1998 directed by Jesper Wachtmeister. It consists of an interview by the journalist Björn Cederberg with the German writer, philosopher and war veteran Ernst Jünger (1895-1998). Jünger talks about his life, his authorship, his interests and ideas. The actor Mikael Persbrandt reads passages from some of Jünger's works, such as Storm of Steel, The Worker, On the Marble Cliffs and The Glass Bees.

Cederberg had interviewed Jünger eight years earlier but only in text. Jünger had declined to participate in the film project, but the film team still decided to travel to the village Wilflingen, where Jünger lived, and make an attempt. As a gift, they gave Jünger, known for his interest in botany and zoology, an 18th-century print of Carl Linnaeus' Systema Naturae, and were granted an interview.
