= Gabriele Kämper =

Gabriele Kämper (born March 30, 1960) is a German literary scholar and head of the Equality Office of the Berlin Senate.

== Life ==
Kämper was born in Cape Town. She studied Latin American studies, German studies and philosophy at the Free University of Berlin and at the Universidad Complutense in Madrid. In 1988, she received her Magister artium at the FU Berlin in the subjects Latin American studies and German literature of modern times with a thesis on the novel Paradiso by the Cuban author José Lezama Lima. In 2003, she received her doctorate from the Technische Universität Berlin with a dissertation on Gender in the Rhetoric of the New Intellectual Right.

At the Senate of the State of Berlin, Kämper was initially a women's policy press spokesperson from 1989 and, from 1991, a consultant for women's policy public relations work. Since 2008, she has headed the Equality office. She is responsible for coordinating and supporting equality processes in all administrative offices of the State of Berlin. In these roles, she has produced several publications, including Materialien zum Frauenhandel (1999), the conference volume Regenbogenfamilien – Wenn Eltern lesbisch, schwul, bi- oder transsexuell sind (2001), in which she argues that this form of family leadership can enrich society, and the book Spreeperlen. Berlin – City of Women (2012). Among other things, she has developed the gender equality policy framework program and the campaign Gleichstellung weiterdenken for the state of Berlin.

In her literary publications, Kämper has dealt with the topics of rhetoric as gender discourse, intellectual New Rights and their masterminds of the Conservative Revolution, above all Ernst Jünger, and the repositioning of the national in German literature after German Reunification.

In 1998, she published an essay in which she examined the obituaries of Ernst Jünger. With one exception, these were written by men. Her analysis was based on the fact that male authors across different political camps and generations were fascinated by Jünger's work and his person. At the center of this fascination, Kämper identified a specific masculinity construct, which she described as the cult of coldness.

For the title of her dissertation, Kämper chose a quote from Jünger's 1922 essay Der Kampf als inneres Erlebnis, in which Jünger glorified war as a mythical natural event: Dem Phallus schimmernde Tempel errichten .... Her work was published as a book in 2005 under the title The Male Nation. In it, Kämper analyzed the anthology The Self-Confident Nation, published in 1994 by Heimo Schwilk and Ulrich Schacht, as a manifesto of an intellectual Right that had been forming in Germany since the Wende, a publication which, according to Barbara Sichtermann, pursued the intention of "helping Germany out of its penitential attitude – having started two world wars and being responsible for Auschwitz. "12] Kämper examined the authors' texts for images and metaphors beyond the actual statements, drawing on the analyses of the fantasies of soldierly men as elaborated by the cultural scientist Klaus Theweleit in his book Männerphantasien. The cultural sociologist Thomas Kleinspehn concluded in his review for Deutschlandfunk: "After reading it, it should be difficult to continue to cover the neo-conservative idyll with cuddles and to trivialize it."
