= List of dream diaries =

This is a list of published diaries devoted specifically to dreams.

== 19th century and earlier ==
- Anna Kingsford (1846–1888), in her Dreams and Dream-Stories (1888, edited by Edward Maitland; revised edition 1908, edited by Samuel Hopgood Hart), pp. 27–94 of the 1908 edition.
- Hervey de Saint-Denys (1822–1892), extracts throughout his Dreams and How to Guide Them (1982, translated by Nicholas Fry). First published as Les Rêves et les moyens de les diriger (1867).
- Olive Schreiner (1855–1920), Dreams (1890)
- Robert Southey (1774–1843), in The Correspondence of Robert Southey with Caroline Bowles (1881, edited by Edward Dowden), pp. 366–384.
- Emanuel Swedenborg (1688–1772), Swedenborg's Dreams, 1744 (1860, translated by J. J. G. Wilkinson), Emanuel Swedenborg's Journal of Dreams and Spiritual Experiences (1918, translated by C. Th. Odhner), Swedenborg's Dream Diary (2001, translated by Anders Hallengren). First published as Swedenborgs Drömmar, 1744 (1859).

== 20th century and beyond ==
- William Archer (1856–1924), in his On Dreams (1935, edited by Theodore Besterman), pp. 135–215.
- Bjørn Bjarre (1966-), Drømmearbeidet, The Dream Work (1-100) (1995) artist's book, ed. 400, (English/Norwegian).
- Peter Blobbs (pseudonym of Arthur John Hubbard, 1856–1935), Authentic Dreams of Peter Blobbs (1916).
- William S. Burroughs (1914–1997), My Education: A Book of Dreams (1995).
- François Damian, L'Autre rive: Paroles dans la nuit (Paris: Editions de Minuit, 1985).
- Mabel Dodge Luhan (1879-1962), The Dreams of Mabel Dodge: Diary of an Analysis with Smith Ely Jelliffe, ed. by Patricia R. Everett (New York, Routledge, 2021)
- Federico Fellini (1920–1993), The Book of Dreams (New York, Rizzoli, 2008)
- Graham Greene (1904–1991), A World of My Own: A Dream Diary (1992).
- David Holt (1926–2002), Eventful Responsability [sic](1999). In his introduction Holt explains the idiosyncratic spelling: "We are responsible in the sense of being in debt to the past. And we are responsible towards the future.... I use the spelling 'responsability' to keep those two different but related meanings in play...."
- Franz Kafka (1883–1924), Träume: "Ringkämpfe jede Nacht" (1993, edited by Gaspare Giudice and Michael Müller). A dream diary compiled from Kafka's diaries and letters.
- Jack Kerouac (1922–1969), Book of Dreams (1961).
- Michel Leiris (1901–1990), Nights as Day, Days as Night (1988, translated by Richard Sieburth). First published as Nuits sans nuit, et quelques jours sans jour (1961).
- Hiroko Nishikawa Lovely Sweet Dream, inspiration for LSD: Dream Emulator.
- E. M. Martin (pseudonym of Edith Georgina Lister, 1859–1938), Dreams in War Time (1915).
- Myōe (1173–1232), in George J. Tanabe Jr's Myōe the Dreamkeeper (1992), pp. 160–198.
- Georges Perec La Boutique Obscure, a collection of 100 dreams.
- Nancy Price (1880–1970), Acquainted with the Night: A Book of Dreams (n.d.; 1949 according to the British Library catalogue). Illustrated by Michael Rothenstein. Written by an actress, who also made a name for herself as a naturalist and campaigner for animal rights.
- Henry Rollins (1961-), 61 Dreams, a section at the end of Black Coffee Blues (1992).
- John Berryman (1914–1972), "Dream Songs, 1964".
- Marilyn Stablein (1946-) ″Night Travels to Tibet″ (2001) and ″More Night Travels to Tibet″(2011).
- Bjarni Bjarnason "The Naked Suitor". (Icelandic: Nakti vonbiðillinn) 2012.
- Ernst Jünger (1895-1998), A German Officer in Occupied Paris: The War Journals, 1941-1945, selected entries. Many other dream narratives are included in Jünger's The Adventurous Heart: Figures and Capriccios.
- Vladimir Nabokov (1899-1977), Insomniac Dreams: Experiments with Time by Vladimir Nabokov (2017).

== See also ==
- Dream journal
- List of diarists
- Personal journal
- Oneiromancy
