= The Glass Bees =

1957 novel by Ernst Jünger

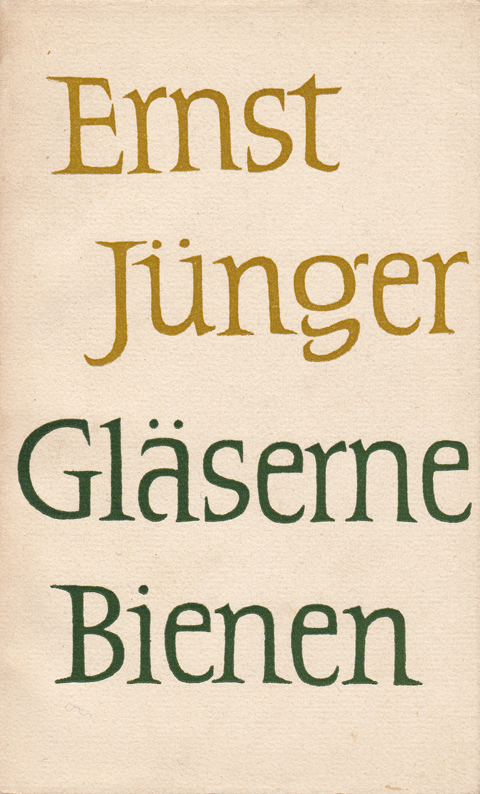
- Cover of the first edition
- Author: Ernst Jünger
- Original title: Gläserne Bienen
- Translator: Louise Bogan and Elizabeth Mayer
- Cover artist: Albrecht Ade
- Language: German
- Genre: Science fiction novel
- Publisher: Klett
- Publication date: 1957
- Publication place: Germany
- English publication date: 1961
- Media type: Print (Hardcover & Paperback)
- Pages: 209 pp
- ISBN: 0-940322-55-2
- OCLC: 44675899
- Dewey Decimal: 833/.912 21
- LC Class: PT2619.U43 G513 2000

The Glass Bees (German: Gläserne Bienen) is a 1957 science fiction novel written by German author Ernst Jünger. The novel follows two days in the life of Captain Richard, an unemployed ex-cavalryman who feels lost in a world that has become more technologically advanced and impersonal. Richard accepts a job interview at Zapparoni Works, a company that designs and manufactures robots including the titular glass bees. Richard's first-person narrative blends depiction of his unusual job interview, autobiographical flashbacks from his childhood and his days as a soldier, and reflection on the themes of technology, war, historical change, and morality.

In recent years, Jünger's prognostications on the future of technology, variously interpreted as technophobic allegory or insightful critique into the altered relationship between technology, nature, and the human, have received some attention. American science fiction writer Bruce Sterling composed an introduction for the New York Review Books edition in 2000, saying that "its speculations on technology and industry are so prescient as to be uncanny."

== Plot ==
Out-of-work former cavalryman and tank inspector Captain Richard is offered a job interview with a "catch" by a former comrade, Twinnings: namely, he suggests a morally questionable position with Giacomo Zapparoni, whose firm builds advanced robots; occasionally one of his engineers deserts, and he needs a man to "take care of" the problem to protect company secrets. At this point a reluctant Richard offers the first of many essayistic narrative asides, as he outlines the social magnitude of Zapparoni's creations, and the first of many autobiographical flashbacks, recounting his days in Military Academy under the guidance of his strict yet caring instructor, Monteron.

Two days later, while nervously awaiting Zapparoni, Richard notices how Zapparoni's modest house appears strangely old-fashioned for a man who made his vast fortune in robotics. This tension between new and old prompts Richard to nostalgically reflect upon the historic demise of cavalry, supplanted by mechanized modern warfare. The suicide of his comrade Lorenz, who refused to adapt to the vertiginous pace of technological, social change, figures prominently in his reflection; for Richard, Lorenz's death exemplifies the fate of those who cannot "find firm ground under [their] feet in the present". Richard's ruminations then turn inward, as he narrates his own lack of worldly success and his negative evaluations by superiors as an "outsider with defeatist inclinations."

When the elderly Zapparoni finally makes his entrance, Richard senses his latent power, remarking that there is more to him than his intelligence. In a narrative aside prompted by a question from Zapparoni, Richard contrasts his former comrades Fillmor, Lorenz, and Twinnings. Unlike either Lorenz and Twinnings, Fillmor, now a successful high officer, is driven entirely by ambition, yet totally lacks imagination. So when Zapparoni asks Richard for his opinion on Fillmor's memoir, Richard is unsure how to respond. Over the course of a tactical conversation, Zapparoni begins with familiar territory for Richard, namely war, yet is quickly able to master the discussion, forcing Richard into contortions and self-contradictions. Zapparoni then announces that he has other matters to attend to, and asks Richard to wait for him in the garden, warning him to beware of the bees.

Out in the garden Richard, through a pair of sophisticated binoculars, discovers the glass bees. Watching them, he observes how these robotic bees are much more efficient at gathering nectar than real bees, and marvels at their construction. As he watches the bees, he notices a pond filled with severed ears. Richard briefly considers contacting the police but realizes that the powerful Zapparoni could easily frame him.

Richard's predicament spurs a childhood reminiscence about Atje Hanebut, "chief" of Richard's neighborhood gang. One day, Atje has them savagely beat a member of a rival gang. Richard tries to stop Atje, calling his attention to the boy's bleeding nose, for which Atje has the boys beat Richard, after which they flee. The rival gang then finds Richard, beating him further in retaliation. Finally at home, Richard is beaten once more, this time by his father.

Leaving the garden, Richard encounters Zapparoni, who reveals that the ears had been severed from humanoid robots, and were a test that Richard has unfortunately failed. Zapparoni then surprises Richard by offering him a different job requiring sharp moral discrimination, which Richard accepts. On the way home, Richard buys Teresa a red dress, they go out for dinner, and Richard begins to forget the events in Zapparoni's garden.

== Themes and motifs ==
The Glass Bees combines the semi-autobiographical narrative and reflections of the narrator, explicitly thematizing such topics as war, technological and historical change, morality, authenticity, and semantic change. It is classified as one of Ernst Jünger's later works. With its simultaneous nostalgia for militaristic order and deep suspicion of technocratic modernity, it is exemplary of this ambiguity in Jünger's work.

The Glass Bees, like another of Jünger's novels, Heliopolis, thematizes the altered relationship between technology, society, and nature; set in a future world in which the distinction between war and peace has been largely effaced. The novel's setting has been variously characterized as "an unspecified future" and a "dystopia." While some aspects of the novel's geography (like Treptow) and history (the mechanization of warfare, for example) have real-world referents, others, such as the "Asturian civil war," do not. Jünger uses dystopian settings "to show that by heroic exertion humankind can live on the dreadful terms technology shall dictate". Thomas Nevin has described Jünger's conceptualization of technology by comparing it to Marxism: "Marxists preached that technological advances entail ideological changes. For Jünger technology is its own ideology, superseding all others."

The Glass Bees contains frequent allusions to E.T.A. Hoffmann's tale The Sandman, a work which also explores the themes of automation and vision.

=== War ===
Richard sees technological advancement as primarily responsible for undermining a chivalric martial code, making of war a more technocratic affair, and ultimately effacing the difference between war and peace, depriving war of the possibility for either meaning or heroism.

=== Technology vs. nature; present vs. past ===
Critical reception of the novel has focused on the thematic centrality of technology, yet critics disagree on the novel's stance towards technology. The Glass Bees has variously been characterized as dystopic, technophobic, technologically prescient, and skeptical of technology. Marcus Bullock, professor emeritus of English at the University of Wisconsin–Milwaukee, sees the novel as a reversal of Jünger's earlier technological optimism, exemplified in a text like The Worker (1932) which speculates "on the potential of industrial technology to transform human society into an absolute expression of collective organization and total power." The novel's portrayal of technology is closely tied to a nostalgic lament for the perceived loss of a natural, idyllic past, contrasted to a mechanistic, technologically determined present. He often directly states that the past - when horses were used in battle and men saw who they were fighting - is better than the present, where one cannot see one's opponents. He sees happiness and technology as directly opposed: "Human perfection and technical perfection are incompatible. If we strive for one, we must sacrifice the other", and sees human dignity as highly compromised by technology and machines: "They were hired to do piecework, which was beneath a man’s dignity...what for millenniums had been man’s vocation, joy, and pleasure - to ride a horse, to plow in the morning the steaming field...all this...was now past and gone. Joy in labor had disappeared". For Richard, the extent of mechanization in the novel's world undermines the autonomy of the individual and threatens to place all social relations within an "instrumental order of identity" based upon "a hierarchy of efficiency." The theme of the "connection between the eternal, technological present and the ideas and hopes of the ancient historical past" is one used by Jünger in more than one work. Scenes in The Glass Bees such as the discovery of the severed ears prompt reflection on the fragmenting effect of modern technologies, which serve to undermine nature, experience, and the human body as organic, meaningful integral totalities. Furthermore, the novel's focus on the nanoscale throws the very distinction between the organic and the mechanical into question, threatening to render it obsolete.

=== Value of the minute ===
A key concept of The Glass Bees is illustrated through the novel's focus on the minuscule. Demonstrated both by the structure of the narrative and through Zapparoni's forays into nanotechnology, it is seen that it is the minute that has the most meaning and influence in life, not the grand or conspicuous. Zapparoni's tiny creations are the first lens through which Jünger plays with the theme of miniaturization - the title itself refers to one such creation. The glass bees exemplify how it is the overlooked that often possesses the greatest meaning. At first an unappreciated aspect of Zapparoni's garden, Richard eventually notices the intricacy and difficulty of creating something so small: "In the beginning, probably it was less difficult to create a whale than a hummingbird", and comes to acknowledge that the true nature of the garden is "more significant than it had seemed to me in my first consternation". As such, the garden acts as a microcosm of the novel's world: only upon reflection does the true nature and relevance of the overlooked become apparent.

The glass bees are not Zapparoni's only tiny creations: in making toys "he created a lilliputian realm, a pygmy world". In constructing small and intricate creations rather than titanic beings, Zapparoni acknowledges the fact that it is only through the subtle and seemingly insignificant that lives are influenced. Besides the example of the physically small machines in the novel, the lasting consequences of the infinitesimal are reflected in the narrative structure of the novel as well. Focusing mainly on the events of only a few hours in the present, the novel explores not only the impact such a small amount of time can have, rather how the minutiae of the past construct the present. Expressed through numerous flashbacks, it becomes clear how Richard's past actions and interactions have shaped him. Kim Goudreau commented, "despite his visceral association with war and changing regimes, Jünger places little to no emphasis upon the institution of government." It is not the world-shattering events, the wars, the societal decay, or the collapse of governments that Richard focuses on as his formative experiences, rather the small and overlooked moments: single nights and instants from military school and childhood.

Devin Fore has read the prevalence of the nanoscale in the novel as a prescient shift of emphasis from an anthropocentric mesoscale to the a-human, microscopic scale of the insect, constituting a meditation upon "the cultural and anthropological challenges that would attend this process of technical recalibration."

=== Morality ===
Throughout the novel, Richard both pontificates on and must actively deal with morality. His first reaction to the job offer that starts off the plot is objection to its dubious moral standpoint - Zapparoni wants someone to do his dirty work for him in dealing with deserting engineers. His decision to work for Zapparoni, an incredibly powerful man, calls into question the relationship between power and morality: according to one interpretation, "We come to discover a world where the desperate struggle for survival and success leaves power unmitigated by any recognizable form of morality". Richard himself suffers insecurity about his morals, wondering if he is being silly for sticking by them in such a world. Late in the novel, Richard proclaims "The moment has now come when I ought to speak of morality. This is one of my weak points: therefore I shall be brief. My unlucky star had destined me to be born when there was much talk about morality and, at the same time, more murders than in any other period...” While the novel doesn't come to any grand conclusion about morality, it raises questions about whether individual morality is possible within a world determined by power and success, in which the meaning of conventional moral precepts has become as ambiguous as the distinction between natural and artificial.

== Critical reception ==
Ernst Jünger's The Glass Bees met mixed critical reception, particularly in its early years. In a 1999 biography of Jünger, A Dubious Past: Ernst Jünger and the Politics of Literature After Nazism, Elliot Yale Neaman points out criticisms from Günther Oliass, Wolfgang Schwerbrock, and Günther Block, all dated 1957. Oliass makes the argument that Jünger's argument is non-topical for the time period, claiming, "It doesn't appear that technology replaces nature of man the way that Jünger thinks. He dreams up romantic constructions". Schwerbrock called the story "artificial," and Block claimed Jünger failed to portray technology realistically and relied too much on allegory. On the other hand, others said his style since Heliopolis had improved and he showed more warmth and vitality. All in all, according to Elliot Neaman, "the general impression remains ... that the book just 'didn't have much to say'".

John K. Cooley had a more positive view of the book, putting it into context of Jünger's earlier works in an Autumn 1958 issue of Books Abroad. Cooley points out that Jünger seems to have found a modus vivendi between the prevalent forces of old and new. On a similar note, much like Neaman, he mentions that Jünger seems to be on a warmer level with the fact that the individual's necessary compliance with the new dehumanized worlds of technology. Neaman disagrees with this point, calling the book "a synthesis of Gehlen's cultural pessimism and the anarchist assault on the machine".

In the Summer 1958 issue of Books Abroad, Gerhard Loose praises The Glass Bees for its "astonishing continuity of thought". He praises Jünger's ability to cover many significant creative ideas of the past thirty years, "skillfully fashioned into a tight web of motive and symbol". On the other hand, he finds fault in the apparent change in the protagonist from a cliché "true soldier" figure with colloquial syntax to one with superb stylistic prose, which he finds to be artificial. Later, in his biography of Ernst Jünger, published in 1974, Loose comments that The Glass Bees is "essentially a philosophical novel" of technology. He notes how the history of Zapparoni not fully explained, and that Zapparoni is hard to believe as a character, somehow both good and evil. He mentions that both Richard and Zapparoni are "burdened, perhaps overburdened, with ideas -- those of the author".

Later criticism was more receptive of the novel's philosophical value and explored the tough questions Jünger tackled. The philosopher Gilles Deleuze made several references to the novel, and particularly to Jünger's argument that Homeric gods associated with work were always in some way disabled, whereas those of war were not: implying that work involves a mutilation 'in advance'. In "Ethics, Automation, and the Ear", Kochhar-Lindgren sees Jünger's metaphysical conception of human existence as threatened by the impending domination of technology. While technology ensures that destruction continues, as Jünger had seen in World War I, pain and death, the only true measures of humanity, will not for these technological creations. Thus, the "Dasein" or human existence will cease to exist. Kochhar-Lindgren goes on to deal with the metaphysical questions Jünger addresses.
