= Fire and Blood (novella) =

1925 novella by Ernst Jünger

Fire and Blood (Feuer und Blut) is a novella by Ernst Jünger, first published in 1925. It is an expanded reworking of the chapter "The Great Battle" from his memoir Storm of Steel, which recounts the German Spring Offensive of 1918 during the First World War.

Jünger published Storm of Steel in 1920, and it attracted considerable attention from contemporary critics. He followed it with the two expanded extracts Copse 125 in 1924 and Fire and Blood in 1925. Jünger exchanged a signed copy of Fire and Blood with Hitler for a copy of Mein Kampf.
