= Antaios (magazine) =

German cultural magazine (1959–1971)

- Editor-in-chief: Philipp Wolff-Windegg
- Editors: Mircea Eliade; Ernst Jünger
- Categories: cultural magazine
- Frequency: bi-monthly
- Circulation: 3000 (1959), 1200 (1971)
- Publisher: Ernst Klett Verlag
- Founder: Ernst Klett
- First issue: 1959
- Final issue: 1971
- Country: West Germany
- Based in: Stuttgart
- Language: German

Antaios was a German cultural magazine published from 1959 to 1971 by Ernst Klett Verlag and edited by Mircea Eliade and Ernst Jünger. It had a conservative orientation and promoted perennial philosophy and the study of archetypes. The magazine drew inspiration from the Eranos circle and the German cultural magazine Merkur. It had a circulation of around 3000 copies in its early existence and around 1200 by the time it was discontinued.

== History ==
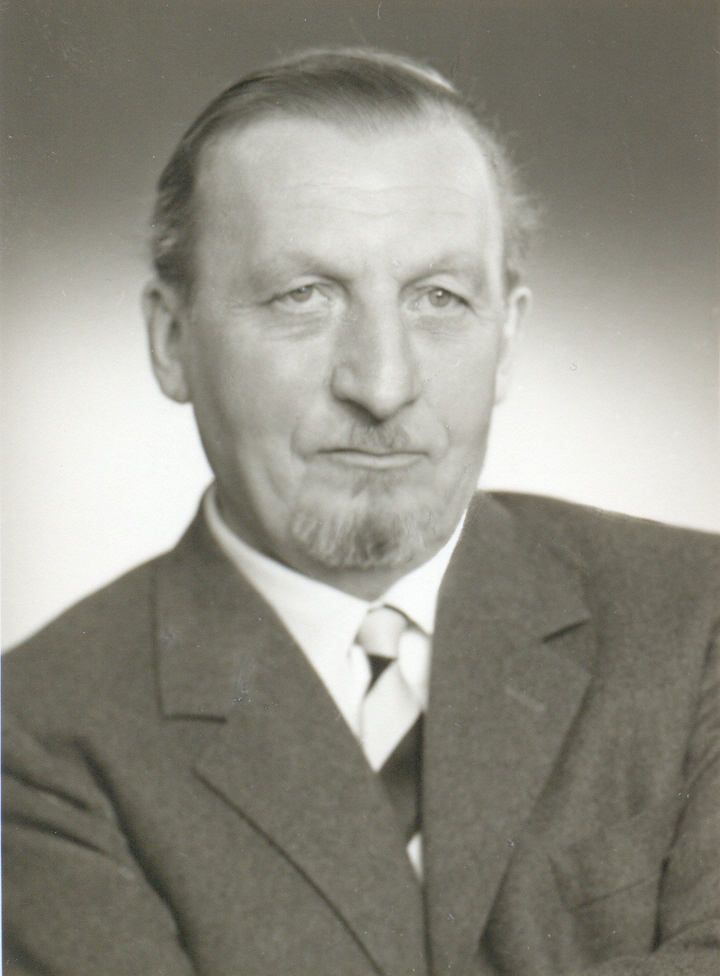
Ernst Klett in 1973

The bi-monthly magazine Antaios was initiated by the publisher Ernst Klett, who wanted to involve the scholars of the Eranos circle, which held regular conferences mainly focused on religious studies, in a conservative cultural magazine. Role models for Antaios were the Eranos yearbooks, the cultural magazine Merkur and Mircea Eliade's journal Zalmoxis. Eliade, an Eranos regular, was recruited by Klett as an editor. Ernst Jünger had been impressed by Zalmoxis and accepted to edit the magazine with Eliade; other people who had been approached but rejected the position included Aldous Huxley, Joseph Campbell and Karl Jaspers. Klett's nephew Philipp Wolff-Windegg was appointed as editor-in-chief. Although Eliade's and Jünger's names were closely associated with the magazine, their involvement as editors was very limited, and it was Wolff-Windegg who handled the selection of writers and articles.

The first six issues were published with the subtitle Zeitschrift für eine freie Welt (lit. 'Magazine for a free world'). In the early existence of the magazine, the circulation was around 3000; toward the end it was around 1200. Due to the failure to increase the readership and Klett's acquisition of Merkur in 1968, Antaios was discontinued in 1971.

== Contents ==
Each issue is around 100 pages long and mainly consists of essays and articles on cultural history. There is no narrative prose but literary sketches sometimes appear. Characteristic is the priority of perennial philosophy and archetypes over historical-sociological perspectives. Many of the texts discuss the West's place in the world, which typically is portrayed as increasingly weak. Some of the content can be classified as esotericism.

Through Eliade, the outlook of the archaic man is a recurring theme, and Jünger and his brother Friedrich Georg Jünger made a focus point of technology and its issues. It was a stated goal to serve "tradition", which was said to exist in "myth, symbol and poetry [Dichtung]", although the term itself was not further specified; it is unclear if it was related to the initiatory "Tradition" of Julius Evola, who was published in the magazine twice. Contributors from the Eranos circle included Ernst Benz, Hans Kayser, Laurens van der Post and Kathleen Raine. Other contributors included Will Erich Peuckert, Marcel Jouhandeau and Ernesto de Martino. According to the scholar Ulrich van Loyen, the absence of Jewish contributors can be attributed to Klett.

== See also ==
- Antaeus
- Conservative Revolution
- Counterculture of the 1960s
- Planète
- Traditionalist School
