= A German Officer in Occupied Paris =

Diaries of Ernst Jünger published in 1949

A German Officer in Occupied Paris (published earlier in Germany as Strahlungen) were the published diaries of Ernst Jünger covering the Second World War and the immediate post-war period.

The diaries were published in German in 1949. They were published in English as A German Officer in Occupied Paris: The War Journals, 1941–1945.

They include "Gärten und Straßen" ("Gardens and Streets") and "Das erste Pariser Tagebuch" ("The First Parisian Diary"). He was also given the task of executing a German deserter who had beaten the women sheltering him and been turned in. Jünger considered avoiding the assignment but eventually attended to oversee the execution in, as he claimed in his journal, "the spirit of higher curiosity".

The diaries record a distancing from an earlier enchantment with technology that was evident in earlier work, particularly The Worker. He also extensively read The Bible in his time in France.

He met a number of artists including the novelist and collaborator Louis-Ferdinand Céline who on 7 December 1941 occasion at the German Institute "spoke of his consternation, his astonishment, at the fact that we soldiers were not shooting, hanging, and exterminating the Jews". The first French edition of Jünger's diaries, published in September 1951, named Céline as making this comment. Céline sued the publishers for libel. Jünger resolved the issue by stating that it was a printing error. Subsequent French editions used "Merline" for Céline. Jünger explained later that the decision to replace "Merline" with "Céline" was made by editor Banine, who hated Céline. In 1994, Jünger confirmed for the first time that "Merline" was in reality Céline.

He wrote on 7 June 1942 that he had encountered for the first time the yellow star carried by three little girls who were passing by in the Rue Royale, and that he considered that day as fundamental in his personal history, because he said he was ashamed at that moment of wearing a German officer's uniform.

The diary also included "Caucasian Notes," documenting an Eastern Front reconnaissance mission undertaken from October 1942 to January 1943.

== Bibliography ==
- Engelmann, Berndt (1986). In Hitler's Germany. Pantheon Books. ISBN 978-0-394-52449-8.
- Gnoli, Antonio; Volpi, Franco (1997). I prossimi titani. Conversazioni con Ernst Jünger [The Coming Titans. Conversations with Ernst Jünger]. Milano: Adelphi. pp. 93–94. ISBN 88-459-1325-2.
- Hajduk, Thomas (2008). With a Little Help from My Friends: Ernst Jünger and His Network in the Post-War Period (PDF) (Master's thesis). Durham University.
- Kiesel, Helmuth (1 March 2024). "Jünger, Ernst". Deutsche Biographie (in German). Historische Kommission bei der Bayerischen Akademie der Wissenschaften.
- Thirlwell, Adam (27 June 2019). "Lunches in the Maelstrom". The New York Review of Books.
