= Auf den Marmorklippen (opera) =

2002 opera by Giorgio Battistelli

- Opera by Giorgio Battistelli
- Librettist: Giorgio van Straten; Giorgio Battistelli
- Language: German
- Based on: On the Marble Cliffs by Ernst Jünger
- Premiere: 8 March 2002; Mannheim National Theatre

Auf den Marmorklippen (lit. 'On the Marble Cliffs') is an opera composed by Giorgio Battistelli to a libretto by Giorgio van Straten and Battistelli. It is loosely based on the novel On the Marble Cliffs by Ernst Jünger. In nine scenes described as "musical visions", it tells the story of how the idyllic existence in the Grande Marina is interrupted by an invasion.

Battistelli began to correspond with Jünger in 1986. He and Straten regarded the story in Jünger's On the Marble Cliffs as a "model of a conflict" that separates "culture from barbarism". Battistelli described his opera as a "distillate" of the novel.

The opera premiered at the Mannheim National Theatre on 8 March 2002 in a production directed and designed by Carlus Padrissa and Valentina Carrasco. It starred Yuri Svatenko as the Prince of Sunmyra, Thomas Berau as Frater Minor and Thomas Jesatko as Frater Otho.
