= Visit to Godenholm =

1952 novella by Ernst Jünger

- First English-language edition (publ. Edda Publishing)
- Author: Ernst Jünger
- Original title: Besuch auf Godenholm
- Translator: Annabel Moynihan
- Language: German
- Publisher: 107
- Publication date: 1952
- Publication place: West Germany
- English publication date: 2015

Visit to Godenholm (German: Besuch auf Godenholm) is a 1952 novella by the German writer Ernst Jünger. It tells the story of a group of people who are invited to the island Godenholm in Scandinavia, where they take part in a mind-altering séance with strong surreal imagery.

The book was published in English in 2015, translated by Annabel Moynihan.

== Reception ==
Visit to Godenholm did not receive much attention when it was first published and was for a long time one of Jünger's less read works. In the 1990s it caught the interest of Jünger researchers as a veiled description of one of Jünger's early LSD trips together with Albert Hofmann. In the introduction, Elliot Neaman situates the book in a tradition of linking drug experiences with literary expression, with prominent examples from Romanticism and in the works of Charles Baudelaire.

== Legacy ==
In the 1970 essay collection Annäherungen, a book focused entirely on drugs, Jünger has a chapter titled "Rückblick auf Godenholm", which means "Looking back at Godenholm". The French composer André Almuró made the 1971 opera Visite à Godenholm, which is based on Jünger's novel.
