= The Worker =

The Worker may refer to:

- The Worker: Dominion and Form, a 1932 book by Ernst Jünger
- Daily Worker, a newspaper published in New York City by the Communist Party USA
- Daily Worker a British communist newspaper which became the Morning Star (British newspaper)
- The Daily Worker (Australia) in 1894 a short-lived labor union publication in Sydney, Australia
- The Worker, a newspaper of the Clyde Workers' Committee whose editor John William Muir was jailed in 1916 for publishing an article critical of World War I
- The Worker, a newspaper published from 1922 by the Communist Party of Canada
- The Worker (Brisbane), a labor union publication in Brisbane, Queensland, Australia
- The Worker (TV series), a British sitcom starring Charlie Drake
- The Worker (Wagga) became The Australian Worker, a labor union publication in Wagga, then Sydney, Australia
