= The Peace =

The Peace may refer to:

- The Peace (band), 1970s Zamrock band
- The Peace (essay), 1943 essay
- "The Peace", by Underscores from U, 2026
- "The Peace!", by Morning Musume from 4th Ikimasshoi!, 2002

== See also ==
- Peace (disambiguation)
- La Paz (disambiguation)
