= Storm of Steel =

1920 memoir on WWI by German officer Ernst Jünger

- The cover of the 1929 Chatto & Windus edition. Click to access a PDF of the book.
- Author: Ernst Jünger
- Translators: Basil Creighton (1929);Michael Hofmann (2003)
- Language: German
- Genre: Memoir
- Publication date: 1920
- Publication place: Germany
- English publication date: Doubleday (1929)
- Pages: 187
- Dewey Decimal: 940.482
- Text: Storm of Steel at Wikisource

Storm of Steel (German: In Stahlgewittern; original English title: In Storms of Steel) is the memoir of German officer Ernst Jünger's experiences on the Western Front during the First World War from December 1914 to August 1918. The book is a graphic account of trench warfare and is often seen as either morally ambivalent or actually pro-war.

Storm of Steel was originally printed privately in 1920, making it one of the first personal accounts to be published. It was largely devoid of editorialization when first published, but was heavily revised several times. The book established Jünger's fame as a writer in the 1920s.

As noted by German-British poet and translator Michael Hofmann, who published an English translation of the text in 2004, this book is, after Henri Barbusse's 1916 Under Fire, one of the very first literary accounts of The Great War.

== Plot ==
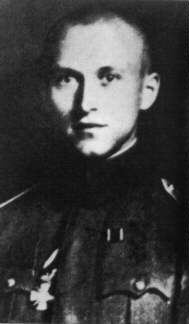
Jünger in 1918

Storm of Steel begins with Jünger, as a private, entering the line with the 73rd Hanoverian Regiment in Champagne. His first taste of combat came in the Battle of Éparges in April 1915 where although he never saw the enemy he was wounded by a piece of shrapnel piercing his thigh.

After recuperating, he took an officer's course and achieved the rank of Ensign, and in November became a Leutnant in the second company. He rejoined his regiment on the Arras sector. In 1916, with the Battle of the Somme underway, Jünger's regiment moved to Combles in August his platoon took up a front line position in a defile near the obliterated remains of the village of Guillemont which had been shelled until it consisted of little more than a dip strewn with the rotting corpses of predecessors. He wrote:

While this hurricane was raging I went along my platoon front. The men were standing, rifle in hand, as though carved in stone, their eyes fixed on the ground in front of them. Now and then by the light of a rocket I saw the gleam of helmet after helmet, bayonet after bayonet, and I was filled with pride at commanding this handful of men that might very likely be pounded into the earth but could not be conquered.

The platoon was relieved but Jünger was wounded by shrapnel in the rest area of Combles and hospitalized; his platoon reoccupied the position on the eve of the Battle of Guillemont and was obliterated in a British offensive. He was wounded for the third time by a sniper in Rancourt in November 1916, and awarded the Iron Cross First Class in January 1917.

Throughout the rest of the war, Jünger was frequently assigned as a company commander, most often with the 7th Company. In 1917 Jünger saw action during the Battle of Arras in April. Colonel von Oppen puts him in charge of training a stormtroop. In the Langemarck in August 1917, Jünger's actions against the advancing British during the Third Battle of Ypres included forcing retreating soldiers to join his resistance line at gunpoint. He arranged the evacuation of his brother, who had been badly wounded and was initially feared missing. In the German counter-attack during the Battle of Cambrai in November Jünger sustained two wounds, one by a bullet passing through his helmet at the back of the head, and another by a shell fragment on the forehead.

He was awarded the House Order of Hohenzollern. While advancing on 19 March 1918 with a company of assault troops to take up positions just before Ludendorff's Operation Michael, Jünger was forced to call a halt after the guides lost their way, and while bunched together half of his company were lost to a direct hit from artillery. Jünger himself survived, and led the survivors as part of a successful advance but was wounded twice towards the end of the action, being shot in the chest and less seriously across the head. After convalescing, he returned to his regiment in June, but this time with a new war weariness.

On 25 August, he was wounded for the seventh and final time near Favreuil, being shot through the lung while leading his company in an advance that was quickly overwhelmed by a British counter-attack. Becoming aware the position where he was lying wounded was about to fall to advancing British forces, Jünger rose and as he did his lung drained of fluids through the wound in his chest, allowing him to recover enough to escape. He made his way to a machine-gun post that was holding out, where a medical officer told him to lie down immediately. While carried to the rear the medical officer is shot and a soldier from his company who tried to carry Jünger on his shoulders was killed after only making it a few yards, but another soldier in the company was able to do so.

In total he had been hit fourteen times. While he was treated in a Hannover hospital, on 22 September he received notice of being awarded the Pour le Mérite, the highest military decoration of the German Empire.

== Style ==
The book is written from diary entries written immediately after the fighting described in fourteen notebooks. This means it is written in a detached, chronological style that focuses on Jünger's frontline experiences and largely ignores his personal life or emotions, and its refusal to offer an explicit moral judgement on the war has led critics to interpret it variously as glorifying war, nationalism, or heroic masculinity.

The judgment of contemporaries and later critics reflects the ambivalence of the work, which describes the war in all its brutality, but neither expressly condemns it nor goes into its political causes, with some critics saying that it can be read affirmatively, neutrally, or as an anti-war book.

== Publication history ==
=== First version ===
Jünger's father initially suggested that he try to publish a book based on his wartime diaries, although he was initially unable to find a publisher. The first version of Storm of Steel privately published in 1920 with a print run of 2000 and the family gardener designated as the publisher. The English version of the original title reads In Storms of Steel: from the Diary of a Shock Troop Commander, Ernst Jünger, War Volunteer, and subsequently Lieutenant in the Rifle Regiment of Prince Albrecht of Prussia (73rd Hanoverian Regiment). The short print run of the first edition indicates it was mainly aimed at regimental veterans.

The first edition was essentially Jünger's unedited diary and regarded as a low literary standard, and subsequent editions moved away from—although never fully abandoned—this initial journal like style. It was also fairly apolitical.

=== Revisions ===
Storm of Steel was frequently and thoroughly revised with up to eight versions of Storm of Steel from 1920 until the last version in 1961 for Jünger's Collected Works. The major revisions came in 1924 and 1934, There are substantial differences between earlier and later versions.

The 1924 revision was a complete rewrite of the original book for his new publisher E.S. Mittler & Sohn written in a more reflective style than the previous diary entries and using explicitly Nationalist catch slogans portraying the trench fighting soldier in an heroic light. This fitted in well with variations he wrote on Storm of Steel including War as an Inner Experience (1922), Copse 125 (1924) and Fire and Blood (1925). He concentrated on war writing throughout the 1920s with his first non war work published in 1929.

The 1934 version tried to stop the work being used for Nazi propaganda and walked back on the 1924 version's nationalism, removing the Nationalist slogans and muting the more explicit descriptions of violence. This edition carried the universal dedication For the fallen. In the 1930s sales of Storm of Steel reached six figures. By 1945 it had sold about a quarter of a millions copies.

The constant revisions meant that not only was Storm of Steel one of the earliest first hand accounts, it was also one of the most recent as well.

=== Translations ===
The first translation came out in 1922 with Julio A. López's Spanish translation titled Bajo la tormenta de acero and based on the original 1920 edition. The 1924 edition was translated into English by Basil Creighton as The Storm of Steel in 1929, and into French in 1930. A new English translation, based on the final 1961 version, was made by Michael Hofmann in 2003 which won the 2004 Oxford-Weidenfeld Translation Prize. In his introduction to his own edition, Hofmann is highly critical of Creighton's translation.

- Bajo la tormenta de acero, translation into Spanish by Julio A. López, Biblioteca del Suboficial 15, Círculo Militar, Buenos Aires 1922.
- The Storm of Steel, translation into English by Basil Creighton, Chatto & Windus, London 1929. Republished by Passage Classics, 2019.
- Orages d'acier. Souvenirs du front de France (1914–1918), translation into French by F. Grenier, Payot, Paris 1930.
- Kōtetsu no arashi, translation into Japanese by Satō Masao, Senshin-sha, Tokyo, 1930.
- Tempestades de acero, translation into Spanish by Mario Verdaguer, Iberia, Barcelona 1930.
- Książę piechoty. W nawałnicy żelaza, translation into Polish by J. Gaładyk, Warszawa 1935.
- Prin furtuni de oţel. Translation into Romanian by Victor Timeu, 1935.
- Orages d'acier. Journal de guerre, translation into French by Henri Plard, Plon, Paris 1960.
- Tempeste d'acciaio, translation into Italian by Giorgio Zampaglione, Edizioni del Borghese, Roma 1961.
- Nelle tempeste d'acciaio, translation into Italian by Giorgio Zampaglione, Collana Biblioteca della Fenice, Parma, Guanda, 1990.
- Tempeste d'acciaio, translation into Italian by Gisela Jaager-Grassi, Collezione Biblioteca n.94, Pordenone, Edizioni Studio Tesi, 1990.
- I stålstormer, translation into Norwegian by Pål Norheim and Jon-Alfred Smith, Tiden norsk förlag, Oslo 1997; 2010 as I en storm av stål: Dagbok fra Vestfronten 1915–1918, Vega Forlag, Oslo 2010.
- W stalowych burzach, translation into Polish by Wojciech Kunicki, Warszawa 1999.
- В стальных грозах, translation into Russian by Н. О. Гучинская, В. Г. Ноткина, Владимир Даль, СПб. 2000.
- Oorlogsroes, translation into Dutch by Nelleke van Maaren, De Arbeiderspers, Amsterdam 2002.
- Storm of Steel, translation into English by Michael Hofmann, Penguin Books, London 2003.
- Tempestades de acero, translation into Spanish by Andrés Sánchez Pascual, Tusquets, Barcelona 2005.
- Teräsmyrskyssä, translation into Finnish by Markus Lång, Ajatus Kirjat, Helsinki 2008.
- I stålstormen, translation into Swedish by Urban Lindström, Bokförlaget Atlantis, Stockholm 2008.
- Orages d'acier, rev. translation into French by Julien Hervier, Gallimard, Paris 2008.
- Tempestades de aço, translation into Portuguese by Marcelo Backes, Cosac & Naify, São Paulo, 2013.
- I stålstormen, translation into Danish by Adam Paulsen and Henrik Rundqvist, Gyldendal, Kopenhagen 2014.
- Acélzivatarban, translation into Hungarian by Csejtei Dezső and Juhász Anikó, Noran Libro Kiadó, Budapest 2014.
- В сталевих грозах, translation into Ukrainian by Юрко Прохасько (Yurko Prokhasko), Чернівці (Chernivtsi), Kyiv, 2014.
- Plieno audrose, translation into Lithuanian by Laurynas Katkus, Kitos knygos, Vilnius 2016.
- În furtuni de oțel, translation into Romanian by Viorica Nişcov, Corint, Bucharest, 2017.
- Çelik fırtınalarında, translation into Turkish by Tevfik Turan, Jaguar Kitap, Istanbul 2019.
- In Storms of Steel, translation into English by Kasey James Elliott, 2021.

== Reception ==
Storm of Steel became a best-seller in Germany and other countries, and its success meant Jünger could become a full time writer. The left-wing French writer André Gide writing in 1942 that "Ernst Junger's book on the 1914 War, Storm of Steel, is without question the finest book on war that I know: utterly honest, truthful, in good faith. It was admired by many left wing writers including Alberto Moravia, Jorge Luis Borges and Bertolt Brecht.

Nazi propaganda minister Joseph Goebbels praised the work calling it the "gospel of war": “A man of the young generation speaks about the war’s deep impact on the soul and describes the mind miraculously. A great book. Behind it a real man.” although later would disparage it as "literature". Despite Jünger remaining aloof from the Nazi Party, Storm of Steel was studied by the Wehrmacht for military training purposes during the Nazi era, and party publications recommended the book as a gift for boys.

The work is often noted for its detached perspective on combat and violence which differs greatly from many other works produced by veterans of the First World War. Although it influenced All Quiet on the Western Front, the historian Jeffrey Herf wrote, "Unlike the pacifist and expressionist novels and plays of the early 1920s such as Remarque's All Quiet on the Western Front or Toller's Gas [the plays Gas and Gas II are actually by Georg Kaiser], Jünger's Stahlgewittern [Storm of Steel] celebrated the Fronterlebnis [Front-experience] as a welcome and long overdue release from the stifling security of the prewar Wilhelmian middle class."

After his death the diary that Storm of Steel and other works were based on were published in full.

== See also ==
- All Quiet on the Western Front

== Bibliography ==
- Boyle, Nicholas (28 February 2008). German Literature: A Very Short Introduction. Oxford: Oxford University Press.
- Godshall, Kevin (2012). "Storm of Steel". Modernism Lab. Yale University.
- Herf, Jeffrey (1984). Reactionary modernism: Technology, culture, and politics in Weimar and the Third Reich. Cambridge University Press.
- Hofmann, Michael (4 May 2004). "Introduction". In Jünger, Ernst (ed.). Storm of Steel. London: Penguin.
- Kiesel, Helmuth (1 March 2024). "Jünger, Ernst". Deutsche Biographie (in German). Historische Kommission bei der Bayerischen Akademie der Wissenschaften.
- Kühl, Richard (8 October 2014). "Jünger, Ernst". In Daniel, Ute; Gatrell, Peter; Janz, Oliver; Jones, Heather; Keene, Jennifer D.; Kramer, Alan; Nasson, Bill (eds.). 1914-1918-online. International Encyclopedia of the First World War. Berlin: Freie Universität Berlin. doi:10.15463/ie1418.10295.
- Marlantes, Karl (29 May 2016). "The Born Soldier". The New York Review of Books.
- Martus, Steffen (2001). Ernst Jünger (in German). Stuttgart: Metzler. ISBN 3-476-10333-1.
- Schiff, Nick (2024). ""From "Total Destruction" to "Total Dictatorship": The Influence of Ernst Jünger's Visionary Fascism"". CUNY Academic Works.
- Woods, Roger (2006). "Ernst Jünger, the New Nationalists, and the Memory of the First World War". In Leydecker, Karl (ed.). German Novelists of the Weimar Republic: Intersections of Literature and Politics. Boydell & Brewer. pp. 125–140. ISBN 9781571132888.
