= Allgemeine Deutsche Biographie =

German biographical reference work

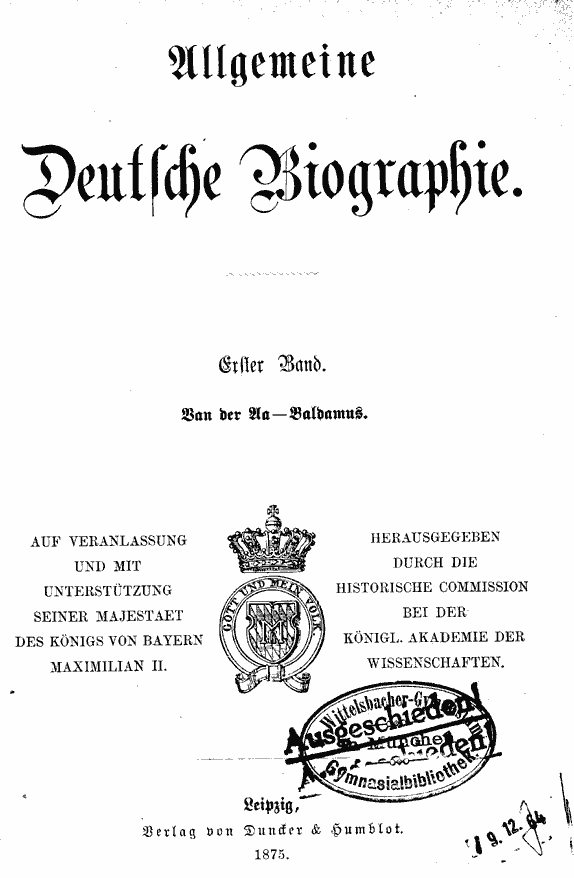
Title page of first volume in 1875

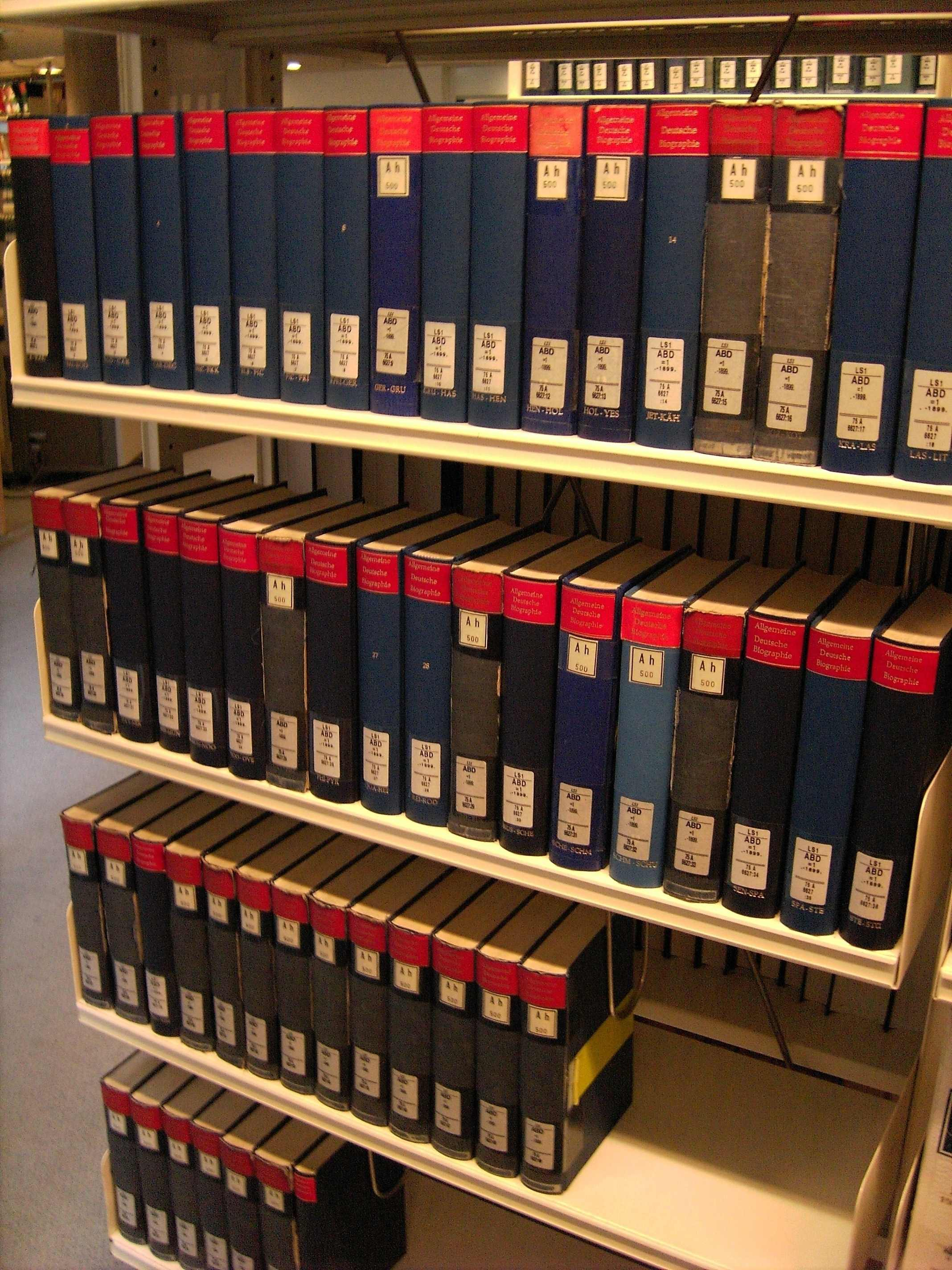
The volumes of the Allgemeine Deutsche Biographie

Allgemeine Deutsche Biographie (ADB; German: Universal German Biography) is one of the most important and comprehensive biographical reference works in the German language.

== History ==
It was published by the Historical Commission of the Bavarian Academy of Sciences between 1875 and 1912 in 56 volumes, printed in Leipzig by Duncker & Humblot. The ADB contains biographies of about 26,500 people who died before 1900 and lived in the German language Sprachraum of their time, including people from the Netherlands before 1648.

Its successor, the Neue Deutsche Biographie, was started in 1953 and is planned to be finished in 2023. The index and full-text articles of ADB and NDB are freely available online via the website German Biography (Deutsche Biographie).
