= On Pain (essay) =

1934 essays by Ernst Jünger

"On Pain" (German: Über den Schmerz) is a 1934 essay by the German writer Ernst Jünger. It is about emerging technology and its impact on human life and self-perception.

The essay was published as the final entry in the 1934 collection Blätter und Steine. It is one of Jünger's most famous writings and has been published as a separate volume, including in a 2008 English translation by David C. Durst from Telos Press.
