= Ernst Jünger Prize =

The Ernst Jünger Prize for Entomology of the State of Baden-Württemberg (German: Ernst-Jünger-Preis für Entomologie des Landes Baden-Württemberg) is a scientific award presented to researchers who have made outstanding contributions to the field of entomology.

== Recipients ==
- 1986 – Hans Georg Amsel, Waldbronn
- 1989 – Gustav Adolf Lohse, Hamburg
- 1992 – Walter Linsenmaier, Ebikon, Switzerland
- 1995 – Alfons M. J. Evers, Krefeld
- 1998 – Friedrich Schaller, University of Vienna
- 2001 – Werner Funke, Ulm University
- 2004 – Günter Ebert, State Museum of Natural History Karlsruhe
- 2007 – Peter Zwick, Max Planck Institute for Limnology, Schlitz
- 2010 – Bert Hölldobler, Arizona State University, Tempe, Arizona, United States
- 2013 – Konrad Dettner, University of Bayreuth
- 2016 – Volker Puthz, Schlitz
- 2019 – Rolf Beutel, Friedrich Schiller University Jena
- 2023 – Ulrike Aspöck, Vienna
