= A Dangerous Encounter =

1985 novel by Ernst Jünger

- Author: Ernst Jünger
- Original title: Eine gefährliche Begegnung
- Translator: Hilary Barr
- Language: German
- Publisher: Klett-Cotta
- Publication date: 1985
- Publication place: West Germany
- English publication date: 1993
- Pages: 169
- ISBN: 9783608953336

A Dangerous Encounter (German: Eine gefährliche Begegnung) is a 1985 novel by the German writer Ernst Jünger. The story is set in Paris in the late 19th century and follows a murder investigation in a decadent aristocratic environment. The book was published in English in 1993, translated by Hilary Barr.

== Reception ==
Publishers Weekly reviewed the book in 1993, calling Junger's writing "shimmering" and "imaginative", and praised his portrayal of the character Ducasse, saying that the character is "the last practitioner of a gentlemanly decadence which itself is the faded reflection of a bygone social structure." Describing the flow of the book, they continued, "If the second half of the novel devolves into a rather unsatisfying francophonic Holmes and Watson riff, its beginning is a clear indication of Junger's talent.

Kirkus Reviews called it "a polished tale from the prolific Jünger, a 97-year-old author who's acclaimed in Europe but little known here", and wrote: "Delicately mannered and full of nuance, this is certainly subtle--but a side effect of its careful, quiet understatement is that it seems over before it's really begun".
