= Sturm (novella) =

1923 novella by Ernst Jünger

- 1963 book edition
- Author: Ernst Jünger
- Translator: Alexis P. Walker
- Publication date: 11–27 April 1923
- English publication date: 1 October 2015
- Pages: 101

Sturm is a 1923 World War I novella by the German writer Ernst Jünger.

== Plot ==
Sturm has a frame story set in the days before the Somme Offensive on the Western Front. A group of German officers meet to discuss the war and listen to the literary sketches read by one of their members, Lieutenant Sturm ("Storm").

== Publication ==
Sturm was serialised in the Hannoverscher Kurier from 11 to 27 April 1923. It was abandoned after a few installments and was forgotten even by Jünger until it was rediscovered in 1960. It was published in book form in 1963. An English translation by Alexis P. Walker was published by Telos Press Publishing in 2015.

=== Translations ===
- Sturm, Dutch translation by Tinke Davids, De Arbeiderspers, Amsterdam 1984
- Lieutenant Sturm, French translation by Philippe Giraudon, Éditions Viviane Hamy, Paris 1991
- Il tenente Sturm, Italian translation by Alessandra Iadicicco, Guanda, Milano 2001
- Sturm, Swedish translation by Urban Lindström, Bokförlaget Augusti, Lund 2006
- Лейтенант Штурм, Russian translation by Vladimir Mikushevich, Vladimir Dal, St. Petersburg 2010
- El teniente Sturm, Spanish translation by Carmen Gauger, Tusquets Editores, Barcelona 2014
- Sturm, English translation by Alexis P. Walker, Telos Press Publishing, New York 2015
- Sturm, Ukrainian translation by Gleb Parfenov, Dipa, Kyiv 2019

== Adaptation ==
A dramatic monologue based on the novella played at the Mainfranken Theater Würzburg in 2014–2015. It was written and directed by Hermann Schneider and starred Sven Mattke.
