= Atlantische Fahrt =

1947 book by Ernst Jünger

- Author: Ernst Jünger
- Language: German
- Genre: travel diary
- Publisher: Dragon Press
- Publication date: 1947
- Publication place: United Kingdom
- Pages: 86

Atlantische Fahrt (lit. 'Atlantic Voyage') is a 1947 book by the German writer Ernst Jünger. It consists of Jünger's diary from a trip to Brazil in 1936. It was the first book by Jünger to be published after World War II.

== Summary ==
The book consists of Ernst Jünger's diary from a 1936 trip to Brazil with the passenger steamship Monte Rosa. Jünger's focus is on botany, zoology and the impressions given by the Brazilian nature and cities. He analyses his impressions as fascinating assaults against the intellect and ponders on the conflict between vitality and intellect. There is little about other people, other than a few notes about Brazilians playing football and moments when Jünger is embarrassed by how some fellow Germans think of locals as savages while being uncultured themselves.

== Publication ==
Atlantische Fahrt was published in 1947 by Dragon Press in London. It was the first book by Jünger to be published after World War II, but could not be published in Germany at the time because Jünger was still under a publishing ban. Klett-Cotta Verlag published a new edition in 2013, reedited by Detlev Schöttker from the original diary with accompanying letters, photographs and postcards. This edition has the subtitle Rio – Residenz des Weltgeistes (lit. 'Rio – Residence of the World Spirit').

== Reception ==
The book received very little attention upon the original publication. Berliner Zeitung wrote in 2013 that Jünger wrote his travel diary in the tradition of Alexander von Humboldt as a way to keep his head cool, and that he comes off as an adventurer who is proud of being on his own. In the book's descriptions of Brazilian cities, the critic saw seeds to Jünger's later writings about an emerging world state.
