= Arminius (journal) =

Arminius (named after the Cheruscan leader Arminius) was a German Conservative Revolutionary magazine published during the Weimar Republic. It succeeded the journal Die Standarte and Ernst Jünger also served for a time as a co-editor. It described itself as independent of any specific nationalist group.

== Sources ==
- Hoffacker, Ursula (1992). "Ernst Jünger". Biographisch-Bibliographisches Kirchenlexikon (in German). Vol. 3. Archived from the original on 2007-06-16.
- Griffiths, Richard (2006). "JUNGER, ERNST (1895-1998)". In Blamires, Cyprian (ed.). World Fascism. ABC-CLIO. pp. 358–359. ISBN 978-1-57607-940-9.
