= Aladdin's Problem =

1983 novella by Ernst Jünger

- First edition
- Author: Ernst Jünger
- Original title: Aladins Problem
- Translator: Hilary Barr
- Language: German
- Publisher: Klett-Cotta
- Publication date: 1983
- Publication place: West Germany
- English publication date: 1 December 1992
- Pages: 121
- ISBN: 9783608952063

Aladdin's Problem (German: Aladins Problem) is a 1983 novella by the German writer Ernst Jünger. It tells the story of an East German former army officer who battles with the problem that man is alone in the world. An English translation by Hilary Barr was published in 1992.

== Reception ==
Philip Brantingham wrote in the Chicago Tribune: "As a narrative, the novel is a failure; not much happens and the characters are flat. But as an enquiry it succeeds by posing problems about the future of the individual in a society dominated by technocrats." Publishers Weekly described the book as an "elegant allegorical novel" and wrote: "Lucid sentences and a finely tuned plot balance a rigorous agenda concerned with nothing less than the mysteries and paradoxes of material existence."
