= Heliopolis (Jünger novel) =

1949 novel by Ernst Jünger

- First edition
- Author: Ernst Jünger
- Original title: Heliopolis. Rückblick auf eine Stadt (Retrospective on a city)
- Language: German
- Genre: Dystopia
- Publisher: Heliopolis Verlag
- Publication date: 1949
- Publication place: Germany
- English publication date: none
- Media type: Print (Hardcover)
- Pages: 389
- ISBN: 3-608-93486-3
- OCLC: 255747851
- Preceded by: On the Marble Cliffs
- Followed by: Eumeswil

Heliopolis (German: Heliopolis: Rückblick auf eine Stadt) is an utopistic or dystopian novel by Ernst Jünger published in 1949. In the fictional city of Heliopolis the henchmen of a Proconsul and a Landvogt (“country master” or “land reeve”) fight each other. Commander Lucius de Geer belongs to the staff of the Proconsul, but he stands more and more aloof from these inner fights. Finally he leaves Heliopolis. The novel connects speculative fiction with philosophic excursions and historical allusions.

The novel takes place in the future at a time not exactly given. Heliopolis is described as a metropolis in the Mediterranean. It controls enormous areas and regions. The names of the countries in the novel indicate that Jünger did not want to imply a specific location. In Greek mythology the Hesperides are regions in the far west of the then-known world; here they are newly discovered areas not completely explored. Also the "Burgenland" ("Castle County"), Asturia, the Parsi and the Mauretanians do not really match existing countries or people of this or similar name. Rather they stand for different political directions or systems.

Jünger readopts several names and topics from his earlier novel On the Marble Cliffs, like the Landvogt and the Mauretanians, and would again use several aspects of Heliopolis later in Eumeswil. Eumeswil shows a fictional world based on Heliopolis carrying on the developments described here.
