= Elliot Neaman =

American intellectual historian (born 1957)

- Born: 1957 (age 68–69)
- Education: University of British Columbia (BA); Free University of Berlin (MA); U.C Berkeley (Ph.d)
- Board member of: University of San Francisco Faculty Association ('15 - '18) Journal of Right-Wing Studies (UC Berkeley)

Elliot Neaman (born 1957) is a professor of history at the University of San Francisco, where he began teaching in 1993. He won the USF Distinguished Research Award in 1999. He received a BA from the University of British Columbia in 1980, an MA from the Free University of Berlin in 1985 and his PhD from UC Berkeley in 1992. He also studied with Paul Feyerabend and Paul Hoyningen-Huene in Zürich in 1981–1982. His dissertation advisor in Berlin was Ernst Nolte. At Berkeley he studied with Martin Jay, Gerald Feldman, Hubertus Dreyfus and Martin Malia. Neaman was president of the University of San Francisco Faculty Association from 2005 to 2018. He is an expert in modern European intellectual history, especially twentieth century Germany. Neaman is also one of the editors of a Festschrift for his mentor from UC Berkeley, Prof. Martin Jay, called The Modernist Imagination (Berghahn 2009). Neaman is also a staff writer for Tikkun Magazine and the German conservative publication Junge Freiheit. He serves on the Editorial Board of the Journal of Right-Wing Studies (UC Berkeley).https://escholarship.org/uc/jrws/editorialBoard

Neaman's first book, A Dubious Past, Ernst Jünger and the Politics of Literature after Nazism (UC Press, 1999) introduced a "critical reception history" of the German writer. In a 2019 interview on a Hermitix podcast, Neaman pointed out how difficult it is to categorize Jünger. He was clearly a right-wing ideologue and leader of the anti-republican war veterans in Germany during the 1920s, but he opposed the Nazis after 1933 and made his peace with the Federal Republic after 1949. The eminent historian of Germany Geoff EleyGeoff Eley, commented on A Dubious Past that the author’s “study provides a first-rate basis in the English language for judging the fullness of Jünger’s career.” Eley also wrote: “A Dubious Past provides a model of ambitiously conceived and carefully contextualized intellectual history, which leaves twentieth-century historians in its debt.” Neaman has also written introductions to new translations of Ernst Jünger's works, including The Adventurous Heart, along with Eliah Bures. In 2015 a Swedish publisher, Edda, brought out the first English translation of Ernst Jünger's postwar novel A Visit to Godenholm, which is a veiled account of an LSD drug trip. Neaman wrote the introduction to the book. Neaman also writes about contemporary issues in European economics and foreign policy. In 2002 he published an article in German Politics and Society about the attacks of 9/11 and the reaction in Germany, which is about the prevalence of anti-Americanism at the time. In 2006 he published "The New (Old) Discourse on the American Empire and the War in Iraq" in Telos, which defends the invasion of Iraq, with certain qualifications. In 2014 he co-published "Light at the End of the Tunnel; the Eurozone's Sovereign Debt Problem in The Journal of World Economics.

Neaman's latest book is about the youth revolts in Germany in the 1960s and terrorism in the 1970s, Free Radicals; Agitators, Hippies, Urban Guerillas and Germany's Youth Revolt of the 1960s and 1970s (Telos Press, 2016). Free Radicals won the Silver Prize at the 2016 Independent Publishers Awards.

Neaman's specialty is European right wing politics. He wrote the foreword to a new translation of Ernst Jünger's World War II journals, A German Officer in Occupied Paris. He contributed a chapter to Mark Sedgwick's edited collection, Key Thinkers of the Radical Right; Behind the New Threat to Liberal Democracy (Oxford University Press, 2019). He also published a compilation of essays
