= Ernst Jünger =

German soldier and author (1895–1998)

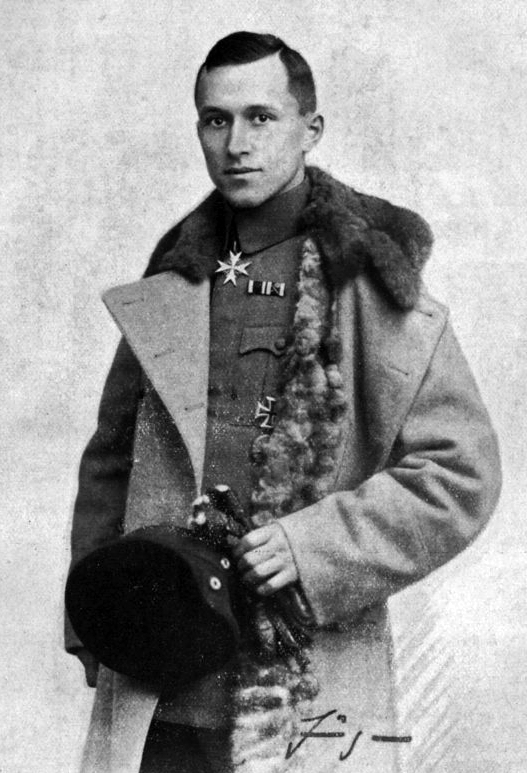
- Jünger in 1920
- Born: 29 March 1895; Heidelberg, Baden, Germany
- Died: 17 February 1998 (aged 102); Riedlingen, Germany
- Spouse(s): Gretha von Jeinsen (m. 1925–1960); Liselotte Jünger (m. 1962)
- Children: 2
- Writing career
- Genres: Diaries and novels
- Subject: War
- Notable works: In Stahlgewittern; Auf den Marmorklippen
- Notable awards: Iron Cross I. Class (1916); Pour le Mérite (1918); Grand Merit Cross (1959); Schiller Memorial Prize (1974); Goethe Prize (1982); Maximilian Order (1986)
- Military career
- Allegiance: France; Germany
- Branch: French Foreign Legion; Prussian Army; Reichsheer; German Army
- Service years: 1913 (France); 1914–1923, 1939–1944 (Germany)
- Rank: Hauptmann
- Conflicts: World War I; World War II

Ernst Jünger (German: [ɛʁnst ˈjʏŋɐ]; 29 March 1895 – 17 February 1998) was a German author, soldier, philosopher, and entomologist who became publicly known for his World War I memoir Storm of Steel. A prolific writer of over forty books, Jünger wrote particularly in the furtherance of conservatism and against what he perceived as the spiritual oppression of man.

The son of a successful businessman and chemist, Jünger rebelled against an affluent upbringing and sought adventure in the Wandervogel German youth movement, before running away to briefly serve in the French Foreign Legion, which was an illegal act in Germany. However, he escaped prosecution due to his father's efforts and was able to enlist in the Imperial German Army on the outbreak of World War I in 1914. During an ill-fated offensive in 1918 Jünger was badly wounded and was awarded the Pour le Mérite, a rare decoration for one of his rank and was the last living recipient when he died in 1998.

Jünger wrote against liberal values, democracy, and the Weimar Republic, but rejected the advances of the Nazis who were rising to power. During World War II Jünger served as an army captain in occupied Paris, but by 1943, he had turned decisively against Nazi totalitarianism, a change manifested in his work The Peace. Jünger was dismissed from the army in 1944 after he was indirectly implicated with fellow officers who had plotted to assassinate Hitler. A few months later, his son died in combat in Italy after having been sentenced to a penal battalion for political reasons.

Immediately after the war, Jünger was punished as a possible fellow traveller of the Nazis but his disengagement from politics in the following years meant his relationship with the radical right remained ambiguous. Jünger died an honoured figure in German literature; although critics continued to charge him with the glorification of war as a transcendental experience in some of his early works.

== Biography ==
=== Early life ===
Ernst Jünger was born in Heidelberg as the eldest of six children of the chemical engineer Ernst Georg Jünger and of Karoline Lampl (1873–1950). Two of his siblings died as infants. His father acquired some wealth in potash mining. He was raised in Hanover. His poor academic performance meant that he changed school several times, going to school in Hanover from 1901 to 1905, and during 1905 to 1907 to boarding schools in Hanover and Brunswick. He rejoined his family in 1907, in Rehburg, and went to school in Wunstorf with his siblings from 1907 to 1912. During this time, he developed his passion for adventure novels and for entomology.

He spent some time as an exchange student in Buironfosse, Saint-Quentin, France, in September 1909. With his younger brother Friedrich Georg Jünger (1898–1977) he joined the Wandervogel movement in 1911. His first poem was published with the Gaublatt für Hannoverland in November 1911. By this time, Jünger had a reputation as a budding bohemian poet.

In 1913, Jünger was a student at the Hamelin gymnasium. In November, he travelled to Verdun and then Marseilles enlisted in the French Foreign Legion for a five-year term, intending to become a big-game hunter in Africa. This was an illegal act in Germany. Stationed in a training camp at Sidi Bel Abbès, Algeria, he deserted and travelled to Morocco, but was captured and returned to camp. Six weeks later, he was dismissed from the Legion due to the intervention of the German Foreign Office, and escaped prosecution. On the return journey he was told by his father that the cost of representations to the authorities had amounted to a vast sum. Jünger was sent to a boarding school in Hanover, where fellow pupils included future communist leader Werner Scholem (1895–1940).

=== World War I ===
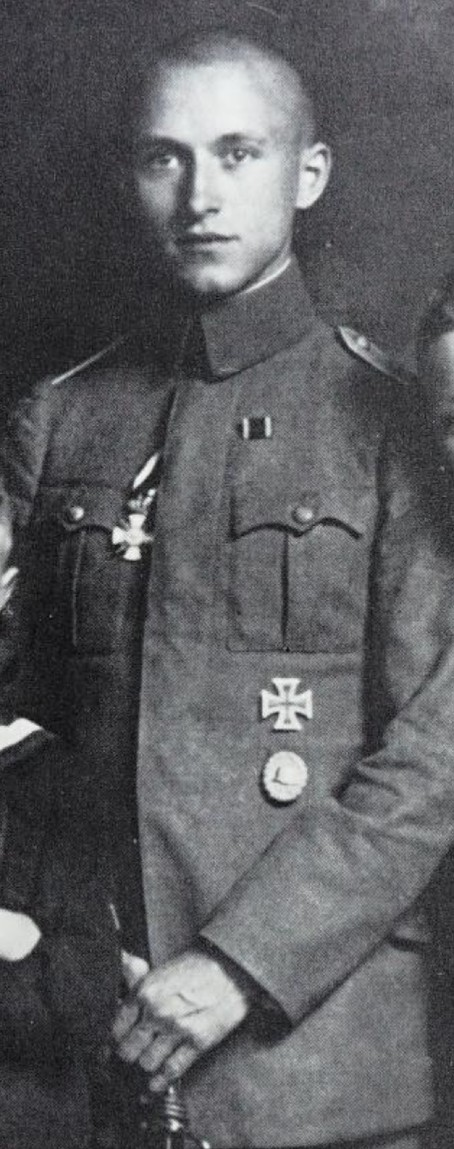
Jünger during World War I, wearing the House Order of Hohenzollern

On 1 August 1914, the day Germany entered the First World War, Jünger, who as a student wasn't caught under the Imperial German conscription system, volunteered for military service. He had to wait for three days in the recruiting office and obtain an emergency school-leaving certificate in order to enlist as a one-year volunteer initially in the 44th Reserve Division. He had transferred to the 73rd Hanoverian Fusilier Regiment by the time he was deployed and after training was posted to the Champagne front in December 1914. After recovering from his first wound, he underwent officer training and was commissioned as a Leutnant in 1915.

As a platoon leader, and later acting company commander, he gained a reputation for aggressive leadership during patrols and reconnaissance missions, a Stoßtruppführer and a pioneer of stormtrooper tactics. Jünger fought in many of the major campaigns on the Western Front, including the Battles of the Somme, Langemarck and Cambrai as well as leading a stormtroop in Operation Michael, reaching the rank of temporary company commander. During the war he had been hit a total of fourteen times was wounded on seven occasions that required evacuation, and received a number of decorations including the Iron Cross and Imperial Germany's highest military decoration, the Pour le Mérite.

He spent his free time reading the works of Ariosto, Nietzsche, Schopenhauer and Kubin. Throughout the war he kept detailed diaries that formed the basis of his first published books starting with the Storm of Steel.

=== Interwar period ===
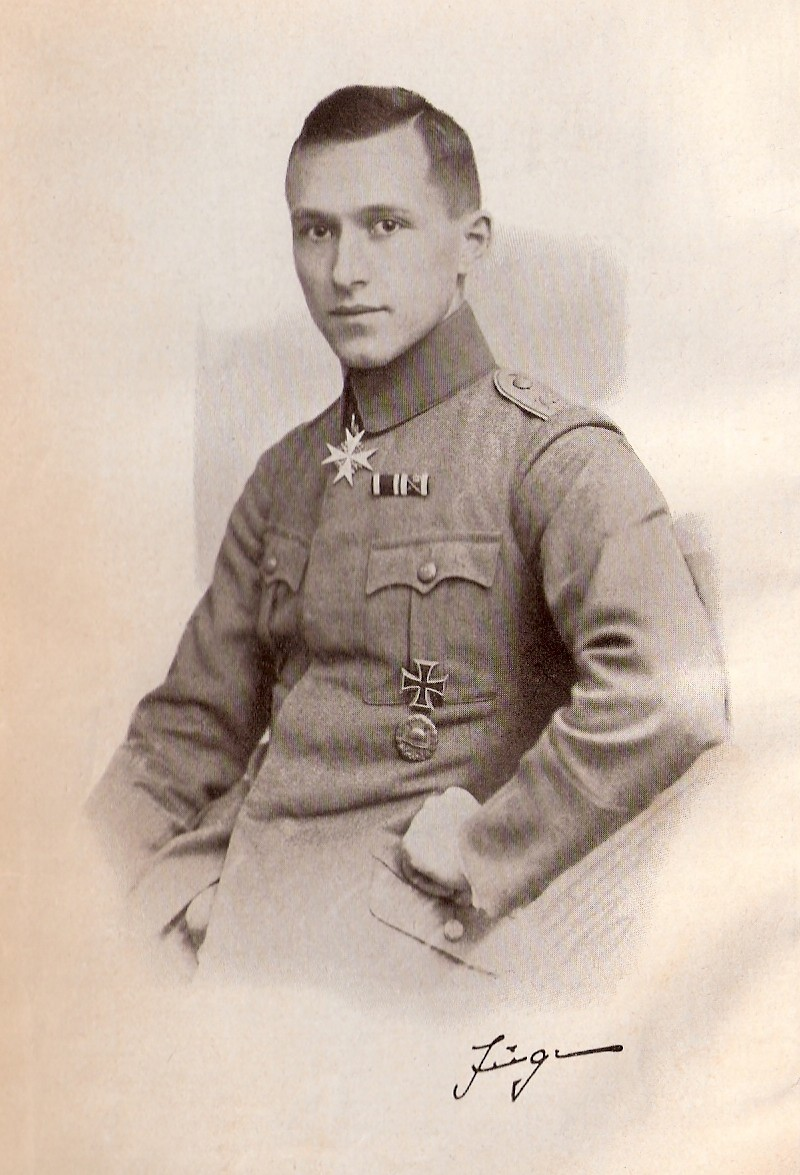
Ernst Jünger in uniform as depicted in the frontispiece of the 3rd edition of In Stahlgewittern (1922)

After the war Jünger continued to serve as a lieutenant in the army of the Weimar Republic revising infantry training techniques. In 1920 at the suggestion of his father he self-published Storm of Steel based on some of his war diaries and was afterwards signed up by the publisher E.S. Mittler & Sohn. He left the army in 1923. He enrolled in the University of Leipzig to study natural sciences which he continued in Naples while combining this with paid political writing although he left university in 1926, and was uninterested in formally graduating. He joined the Freikorps and Stahlhelm. His war experiences described in Storm of Steel gradually made him famous and the success of the book enabled him to become a full time writer. He married Gretha von Jeinsen in 1925 with whom he had two children, Ernst Jr. (1926–44) and Alexander (1934–93).

In later writings in the 1920s such as War as an Inner Experience, Copse 125 and Fire and Blood as well as his heavily edited 1924 version of Storm of Steel he more explicitly than in the first release of Storm of Steel portrayed war as a mystical experience that revealed the nature of existence painting trench soldiers as modern day heroes, and these books together with the Storm of Steel he would call his "Old Testament".

By now an ardent militarist Jünger became a nationalist publicist and criticized the fragile and unstable democracy of the Weimar Republic, stating that he "hated democracy like the plague" preferring a state that was "socially oriented", "militarily prepared" and "hierarchically structured". He supported a "state of the front-line soldiers" brought about through the emergence of a young intellectual elite that would spring out from the trenches of WWI, ready to oppose bourgeois capitalism and to embody a new nationalist revolutionary spirit. In the 1920s, he wrote more than 130 articles in various nationalist magazines, mostly as editor in the Stahlhelm newspaper Die Standarte. He was also editor of the journal Arminius which aimed to unite nationalist movements and contributed to Ernst Niekisch's National-Bolshevik publication Widerstand. However, the historian Louis Dupeux argues that Jünger wanted to use nationalism as an "explosive" and not as an "absolute", to eventually let the new order arise by itself and the association of Jünger to the Conservative Revolutionaries is still a matter of debate among scholars.

In 1932, he published The Worker, which argued that modern econonomic life was an extension of wartime total mobilisation meaning that the bourgeois order brought in by the Enlightenment was giving way to a new society organised around the figure of the Worker. According to Jünger, the essence of the modern was found in total mobilisation for military effectiveness, which tested the capacity of the human senses.

In the essay On Pain (German: Über den Schmerz) written and published in 1934, Jünger rejects the liberal values of liberty, security, ease, and comfort, and seeks instead the measure of man in the capacity to withstand pain and sacrifice. Around this time his writing included the aphorism "What doesn't kill me makes me stronger; and what kills me makes me incredibly strong."

=== Relations with the Weimar Era Nazis ===
As a famous war hero and prominent nationalist critic of the Weimar Republic, the ascendant Nazi Party courted Jünger as a natural ally, but Jünger rejected such advances and never joined the party. When Jünger moved to Berlin in 1927, he rejected an offer of a Nazi Reichstag seat. However he did write articles suggesting that Nationalists could work together with Nazis to create a new Germany and had corresponded with Hitler in the 1920s including exchanging a signed copy of Fire and Blood for one of Mein Kampf.

In 1930, he denounced Hitler's opposition to the Rural People's Movement. In the 22 October 1932 edition of the Völkischer Beobachter, the Nazi Party's official newspaper, the article "The never-ending dialectical debate" (Das endlose dialektische Gespräch) attacked Jünger for his rejection of the "blood and soil" doctrine, accusing him of being an "intellectualist" and a liberal. He also disliked Nazi mass politics, preferring an elitist approach, while also disapproving of their "legalistic" methods.

=== Third Reich ===
Jünger again refused the offer of a Reichstag seat following the Nazi Party's ascension to power in January 1933, and he also refused the invitation to head the Reich Chamber of Literature. Jünger left Berlin in 1933 choosing rural seclusion and his house was searched several times by the Gestapo.

On 14 June 1934, Jünger wrote a "letter of rejection" to the Völkischer Beobachter, in which he requested that none of his writings be published in it. Jünger also refused to speak on Joseph Goebbels's radio. He was one of the few nationalist authors whose names were never found on the frequent declarations of loyalty to Hitler. He found Nazi treatment of Jews as incompatible with military honour and with his brother Friedrich Georg quit the "Traditionsverein der 73er", the veterans' organization of the Hanoverian regiment they had served during World War I, when its Jewish members were expelled.

On the Marble Cliffs (1939), a short novel in the form of a parable, uses metaphor to describe Jünger's negative perceptions of the situation in Hitler's Germany.

=== Second World War ===
As war was becoming more likely Jünger moved to Kirchhorst in April 1939 to be in the Hanoverian recruiting area for his old regiment and at the outbreak of World War II he was drafted as an army captain. On the Western Front in 1939, he rescued a wounded soldier and was again awarded the Iron Cross Second Class. From 1941 to 1944 he was based in the Army headquarters in Paris, assigned to an administrative position as intelligence officer and mail censor and kept a diary that was later published. He socialized (often at the Georges V hotel or at Maxim's) with prominent artists of the day such as Picasso and Jean Cocteau. He also went to the salons of Marie-Louise Bousquet and Florence Gould. There he met Jean Paulhan, Henry de Montherlant, Marcel Jouhandeau and Louis-Ferdinand Céline. He noted in his Parisian diary that Céline "spoke of his consternation, his astonishment, at the fact that we soldiers were not shooting, hanging, and exterminating the Jews". He passed on information about upcoming transports "at an acceptable level of risk" which saved Jewish lives. His office was in the Hotel Majestic and he was billeted at the Hotel Raphael.

The character of Werner von Ebrennac in Jean Bruller's wartime novel Le Silence de la mer is modelled on Jünger.

He extensively read The Bible in his time in France, starting a much disputed interest in Christianity.

Jünger found his countrymen's discriminatory treatment of French Jews unacceptable, writing that seeing the yellow star worn by three little girls made him ashamed of his German officer's uniform.

Jünger appears on the fringes of the Stauffenberg bomb plot. He was clearly an inspiration to anti-Nazi conservatives in the German Army, and while in Paris he was close to the old, mostly Prussian, officers who carried out the assassination attempt against Hitler. On 6 June 1944 Jünger went to Rommel's headquarters at La Roche-Guyon, arriving late at about 9 PM as the bridge at Mantes was down. Present were Rommel's chief-of-staff Hans Speidel, General Wagener, Colonel Linstow, Embassy Counsellor Peter Pfeiffer, reporter Major Wilhelm von Schramm and Speidel's brother-in-law Max Horst (Rommel was in Germany). At 9.30 PM they went to Speidel's quarters to discuss "Der Friede" (The Peace), Jünger's 30-page peace proposal (written in 1943), to be given to the Allies after Hitler's demise or removal from power; also proposed is a united Europe. He returned about midnight. The next day at the Paris HQ Jünger was stunned by the news of the Normandy landings.

Jünger was only peripherally involved in the events, however, and in the aftermath was only dishonorably discharged from the army rather than being executed. He was saved by the chaos of the last months of the war, and by always being "inordinately careful", burning writings on sensitive matters from 1933. Friedrich Hielscher claimed that Hitler said "Nothing happens to Jünger".

His elder son Ernst Jr., then an eighteen-year-old Kriegsmarine cadet, was imprisoned that year for engaging in "subversive discussions" in his Wilhelmshaven Naval Academy (a capital offence). Transferred to Penal Unit 999 as Frontbewährung, i.e. probation through frontline service, after his parents had spoken to the presiding judge Admiral Ernst Scheurlen, he was killed near Carrara in occupied Italy on 29 November 1944 (though Jünger was never sure whether he had been shot by the enemy or by the SS).

=== Post-war period ===
When German Communists threatened his safety in 1945, Bertolt Brecht instructed them to "Leave Jünger alone." Jünger was initially under some suspicion from the Allied occupiers for his nationalist past, and he was banned from publishing in Germany because he refused to appear before a denazification tribunal. The ban was lifted when he moved from the by British occupation zone to Ravensburg in the French zone.

His work The Peace (German title: Der Friede), written in 1943 and published abroad in 1948, marked the end of his involvement in politics. His diaries from 1939 to 1949 were published in 1949 under the title Strahlungen (Radiations). In 1950 he moved to Wilflingen in Upper Swabia. From 1949 to 1953, the Neue Rechte historian Armin Mohler served as Jünger's private secretary.

From the mid-1950s onwards his literary reputation in West Germany grew. From 1959 he was an editor of the conservative cultural magazine Antaios. The publisher Klett put out a ten-volume collected works (Werke) in 1965, extended to 18 volumes 1978–1983. This made Jünger one of just four German authors to see two subsequent editions of their collected works published during their lifetime, alongside Goethe, Klopstock and Wieland.

In the 1950s and 1960s, Jünger travelled extensively. His first wife, Gretha, died in 1960, and in 1962 he married Liselotte Lohrer. He continued writing prodigiously for his entire life, publishing more than 50 books.

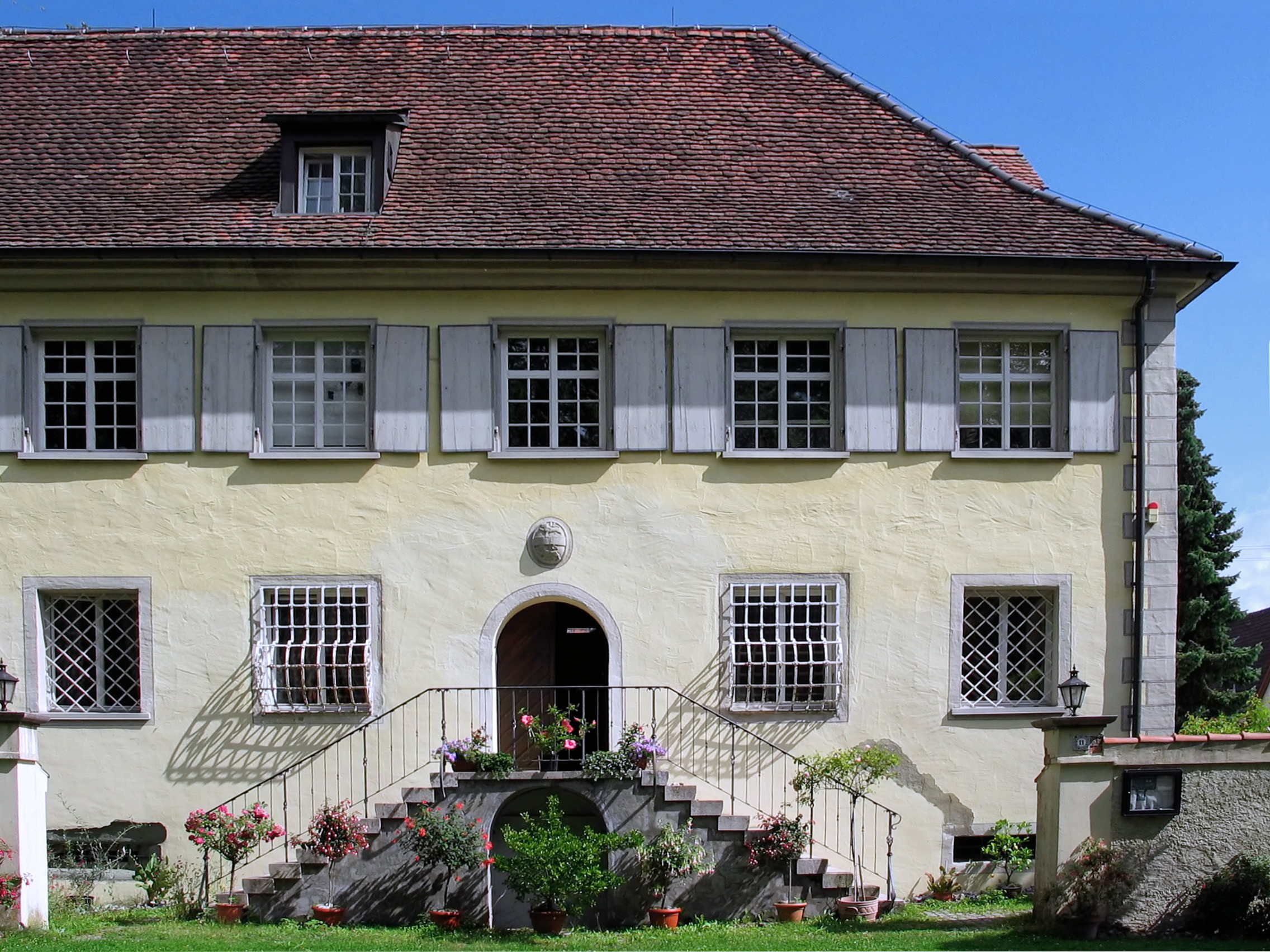
Ernst Jünger House in Wilflingen

Jünger was among the forerunners of magical realism. His vision in The Glass Bees (1957, German title: Gläserne Bienen), of a future in which an automated machine-driven world threatens individualism, could be seen as a story within the science fiction genre. A sensitive poet with training in botany and zoology, as well as a soldier, his works in general are infused with tremendous details of the natural world.

Throughout his life he had experimented with drugs such as ether, cocaine, and hashish; and later in life he used mescaline and LSD. These experiments were recorded comprehensively in Annäherungen (1970, Approaches). The novel Besuch auf Godenholm (1952, Visit to Godenholm) is clearly influenced by his early experiments with mescaline and LSD. He met with LSD discoverer Albert Hofmann and they took LSD together several times. Hofmann's memoir LSD, My Problem Child describes some of these meetings.

=== Later life ===
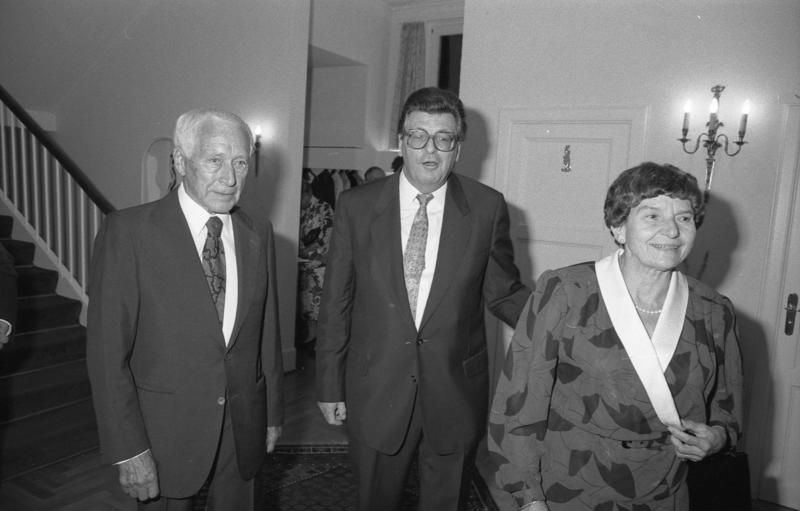
Jünger (left) and his wife Liselotte at a reception of the President of the Bundestag, Philipp Jenninger in 1986

One of the most important contributions of Jünger's later literary production is the metahistoric figure of the Anarch, an ideal figure of a sovereign individual, conceived in his novel Eumeswil (1977), which evolved from his earlier conception of the Waldgänger, or "Forest Fleer" by influence of Max Stirner's conception of the Unique (der Einzige).

In 1981, Jünger was awarded the Prix mondial Cino Del Duca. In 1982 he was awarded the Goethe Prize, but this was attended by a street demonstration in the City of Frankfurt on the day he received the award.

In 1984, he spoke at the Verdun memorial, alongside his admirers, French president François Mitterrand and Helmut Kohl the German chancellor, where he called the "ideology of war" in Germany before and after World War I "a calamitous mistake".

His younger son Alexander, a physician, committed suicide in 1993. Jünger's 100th birthday on 29 March 1995 was met with praise from many quarters, including the socialist French president François Mitterrand.

=== Death ===
Jünger's father was Lutheran and mother was Catholic, although the home was not very religious and Jünger did not profess any particular denominational belief, but shortly before he died he converted to Roman Catholicism. A year before his death, Jünger was received into the Catholic Church and began to receive the Sacraments. Jünger died on 17 February 1998 in Riedlingen, Upper Swabia, aged 102. Jünger was the last living recipient of the military version of the order Pour le Mérite. He is buried in the Wilflingen cemetery.

His last home is now a museum. After his death the diary that Storm of Steel and other works was based on was published in full.

== Reception and Influence ==
Jünger was regarded as one of the most complex and contradictory figures in 20th-century German literature. By the later stages of the Cold War, his unorthodox writings about the impact of materialism in modern society were widely seen as conservative rather than radical nationalist, and his philosophical works came to be highly regarded in mainstream German circles.

Although he had been cleared of the accusation of Nazi collaboration since the 1950s, Jünger's national conservatism and his ongoing role as conservative philosopher and icon made him a controversial figure and Jünger said he never regretted anything he wrote, nor would he ever take it back although he and his estate both made ongoing efforts to manage his older literary output with no Jünger text "ever been called definitive". Huyssen (1993) argued that nevertheless "his conservative literature made Nazism highly attractive", and that "the ontology of war depicted in Storm of Steel could be interpreted as a model for a new, hierarchically ordered society beyond democracy, beyond the security of bourgeois society and ennui". Walter Benjamin wrote "Theories of German Fascism" (1930) as a review of War and Warrior, a collection of essays edited by Jünger.

Martin Heidegger was heavily influenced by Jünger's The Worker although he did not regard Jünger as a philosopher. Heidegger's interpretation of Jünger's work is compiled in volume 90 of his complete edition, titled "Zu Ernst Jünger". He is still a popular writer on the far-right, with Alain de Benoist writing a book length apology in 2020.

Jünger was immensely popular in France, where at one time 48 of his translated books were in print.

== Entomology ==
From the age of thirteen Jünger developed a passion for entomology and during his First World War service was sent entomological journals from home. During 1917, he was collecting beetles in the trenches and while on patrol, 149 specimens between 2 January and 27 July, which he listed under the title of Fauna coleopterologica douchyensis ("Coleopterological fauna of the Douchy region"). When he enrolled in the University of Leipzig in the 1920s he studied marine biology, zoology, botany, and philosophy. Over time he became a well-known entomologist.

In 1985, to mark Jünger's 90th birthday, the German state of Baden-Württemberg established Ernst Jünger Prize in Entomology. It is given every three years for outstanding work in the field of entomology. In 1995 he received an honorary membership of the German Society for General and Applied Entomology (Deutsche Gesellschaft für allgemeine und angewandte Entomologie).

== Photography ==
Ernst Jünger's photobooks are visual accompaniments to his writings on technology and modernity. The seven books of photography Jünger published between 1928 and 1934 are representative of the most militaristic and radically right wing period in his writing. Jünger's first photobooks, Die Unvergessenen (The Unforgotten, 1929) and Der Kampf um das Reich (The Battle for the Reich, 1929) are collections of photographs of fallen World War I soldiers and the World War front, many that he took himself. He also contributed six essays on the relationship between war and photography in a photobook of war images called Das Antlitz des Weltkrieges: Fronterlebnisse deutscher Soldaten (The Face of the World War: Front Experiences of German Soldiers, 1930) and edited a volume of photographs dealing with the first world war, Hier spricht der Feind: Kriegserlebnisse unserer Gegner (The Voice of the Enemy: War Experiences of our Adversaries, 1931). Jünger also edited a collection of essays, Krieg und Krieger (War and Warriors, 1930, 1933) and wrote the foreword for a photo anthology of airplanes and flying called Luftfahrt ist Not! (Flying is imperative! [i.e., a necessity], 1928).

== Decorations and awards ==
Jünger, wearing both the Pour le Mérite and the Bavarian Maximilian Order

=== Military Decorations ===
- 1914 Iron Cross Second Class
- 1916 Iron Cross First Class
- 1917 Knight's Cross with Swords of the Royal House Order of Hohenzollern
- 1918 Wound Badge in Gold
- 1918 Pour le Mérite (military class)
- 1934 The Honour Cross of the World War 1914/1918
- 1939 Clasp to the Iron Cross Second Class

Ernst Jünger was the youngest ever recipient of the military class of the 'Pour le Mérite', Imperial Germany's highest military decoration, and was one of only eleven infantry company commanders to receive it. It was given on the recommendation of division commander Johannes von Busse. Since new awards of the military class ceased with the end of the Prussian monarchy in November 1918, Jünger was the last living recipient.

=== Civilian Awards ===
- 1956 Bremen Literature Prize (for Am Sarazenentum); Culture Prize of the city of Goslar
- 1959 Grand Merit Cross
- 1960 Honorary Citizen of the Municipality Wilflingen; honorary gift of the Cultural Committee of the Federation of German Industry
- 1965 Honorary Citizen of Rehburg; Immermann Prize of the city of Düsseldorf
- 1970 Freiherr- vom-Stein- Gold Medal of the Alfred Toepfer Foundation
- 1973 Literature Prize of the Academy Amriswil (Organizer: Dino Larese; Laudations: Alfred Andersch, François Bondy, Friedrich Georg Jünger)
- 1974 Schiller Memorial Prize of Baden-Württemberg
- 1977 Aigle d'Or the city of Nice, Great Federal Cross of Merit with Star
- 1979 Médaille de la Paix (Peace Medal) of the city of Verdun
- 1980 Medal of Merit of the State of Baden-Württemberg
- 1981 Prix Europa Littérature the Fondation Internationale pour le Rayonnement des Arts et des Lettres; Prix Mondial Cino the Fondation Simone et del Duca (Paris), Gold Medal of the Humboldt Society
- 1982 Goethe Prize of Frankfurt
- 1983 Honorary Citizen of the city of Montpellier; Premio Circeo the Associazione Italo – Germanica Amicizia (Association of Italian–German friendship)
- 1985 Grand Cross of the Order of Merit of the Federal Republic of Germany
- 1986 Bavarian Maximilian Order for Science and Art
- 1987 Premio di Tevere (awarded by Francesco Cossiga in Rome)
- 1989 honorary doctorate from the University of the Basque Country in Bilbao
- 1990 Oberschwäbischer Art Prize
- 1993 Grand Prize of the Jury of the Venice Biennale
- 1993 Robert Schuman Prize, Alfred Toepfer Foundation
- 1995 honorary doctorate from the Faculty of Arts of the Complutense University of Madrid

== Bibliography ==
=== Collected works ===
Jünger's works were edited in ten volumes in 1960–1965 by Ernst Klett Verlag, Stuttgart, and again in 18 volumes by Klett-Cotta, Stuttgart in 1978–1983, with four supplement volumes added posthumously, 1999–2003. The Sämtliche Werke edition is now partially out of print (out of print as of December 2015: vols. 6, 7, 10, 15–18), and was re-issued in 2015 in paperback (ISBN 978-3-608-96105-8) and epub (ISBN epub: 978-3-608-10923-8) formats. A selection from the full collected works in five volumes was published in 1995 (4th ed. 2012, ISBN 978-3-608-93235-5).

The following is a list of Jünger's original publications in book form (not including journal articles or correspondence).

=== Non-fiction ===
- 1920, In Stahlgewittern (Storm of Steel)
- 1922, Der Kampf als inneres Erlebnis (War as an Inner Experience)
- 1924, Das Wäldchen 125 (Copse 125)
- 1925, Fire and Blood (Fire and Blood)
- 1929, Das abenteuerliche Herz. Aufzeichnungen bei Tag und Nacht (The Adventurous Heart: Recordings by Day and Night)
- 1932, Der Arbeiter. Herrschaft und Gestalt (The Worker: Dominion and Form)
- 1934, Blätter und Steine (Leaves and Stones)
- 1938, Das abenteuerliche Herz. Figuren und Capricios (The Adventurous Heart: Figures and Capriccios)
- 1942, Gärten und Straßen (Gardens and Roads)
- 1943, Myrdun. Briefe aus Norwegen
- 1943, Der Friede. Ein Wort an die Jugend Europas und an die Jugend der Welt (The Peace)
- 1947, Atlantische Fahrt
- 1947, Sprache und Körperbau
- 1948, Ein Inselfrühling
- 1949, Strahlungen
- 1951, Am Kieselstrand
- 1951, Über die Linie
- 1951, Der Waldgang (The Forest Passage)
- 1953, Der gordische Knoten
- 1954, Das Sanduhrbuch
- 1955, Am Sarazenturm
- 1956, Rivarol
- 1958, Jahre der Okkupation
- 1959, An der Zeitmauer
- 1960, Der Weltstaat
- 1960, Sgraffiti
- 1963, Typus, Name, Gestalt
- 1966, Grenzgänge. Essays. Reden. Träume
- 1967, Subtile Jagden
- 1970, Ad hoc
- 1970, Annäherungen. Drogen und Rausch
- 1974, Zahlen und Götter. Philemon und Baucis. Zwei Essays
- 1980, Siebzig verweht I
- 1981, Siebzig verweht II
- 1983, Maxima – Minima, Adnoten zum 'Arbeiter'
- 1984, Autor und Autorschaft
- 1987, Zwei Mal Halley
- 1990, Die Schere
- 1993, Prognosen
- 1993, Siebzig verweht III
- 1995, Siebzig verweht IV
- 1997, Siebzig verweht V

=== Novels ===
- 1939, Auf den Marmorklippen (On the Marble Cliffs)
- 1949, Heliopolis. Rückblick auf eine Stadt (Heliopolis)
- 1957, Gläserne Bienen (The Glass Bees)
- 1973, Die Zwille
- 1977, Eumeswil
- 1985, Eine gefährliche Begegnung (A Dangerous Encounter)

=== Short stories ===
- 1923, Sturm
- 1936, Afrikanische Spiele (African Diversions)
- 1952, Die Eberjagd
- 1952, Besuch auf Godenholm (Visit to Godenholm)
- 1983, Aladins Problem (Aladdin's Problem)

=== Correspondence ===
Klett-Cotta edited Jünger's correspondence with Rudolf Schlichter, Carl Schmitt, Gerhard Nebel, Friedrich Hielscher, Gottfried Benn, Stefan Andres and Martin Heidegger in seven separate volumes during 1997–2008.

- Ernst Jünger, Rudolf Schlichter: Briefe 1935–1955, ed. Dirk Heißerer. Klett-Cotta, Stuttgart 1997, ISBN 3-608-93682-3.
- Ernst Jünger, Carl Schmitt: Briefe 1930–1983, ed. Helmuth Kiesel. Klett-Cotta, Stuttgart 1999, ISBN 3-608-93452-9.
- Ernst Jünger, Gerhard Nebel: Briefe 1938–1974, eds. Ulrich Fröschle and Michael Neumann. Klett-Cotta, Stuttgart 2003, ISBN 3-608-93626-2.
- Ernst Jünger, Friedrich Hielscher: Briefe 1927–1985, eds. Ina Schmidt and Stefan Breuer. Klett-Cotta, Stuttgart 2005, ISBN 3-608-93617-3.
- Gottfried Benn, Ernst Jünger: Briefwechsel 1949–1956, ed. Holger Hof. Klett-Cotta, Stuttgart 2006, ISBN 3-608-93619-X.
- Ernst Jünger, Stefan Andres: Briefe 1937–1970, ed. Günther Nicolin. Klett-Cotta, Stuttgart, 2007, ISBN 978-3-608-93664-3.
- Ernst Jünger, Martin Heidegger: Briefwechsel 1949–1975. eds. Simone Maier, Günter Figal. Klett-Cotta, Stuttgart, 2008, ISBN 978-3-608-93641-4.
- Alfred Baeumler und Ernst Jünger: Mit einem Anhang der überlieferten Korrespondenz und weiterem Material. eds. Ulrich Fröschle und Thomas Kuzias. Thelem Universitätsverlag, Dresden 2008, ISBN 978-3-939888-01-7.
- Ernst Jünger – Albert Renger-Patzsch. Briefwechsel 1943–1966 und weitere Dokumente. eds. Matthias Schöning, Bernd Stiegler, Ann and Jürgen Wilde. Wilhelm Fink, Paderborn/München 2010, ISBN 978-3-7705-4872-9.
- Ernst Jünger, Dolf Sternberger: Briefwechsel 1941–1942 und 1973–1980. eds. Detlev Schöttker and Anja S. Hübner. In: Sinn und Form, 4/2011, S. 448–473
- Luise Rinser und Ernst Jünger Briefwechsel 1939 – 1944, mit einem einleitenden Essay von Benedikt Maria Trappen Aufgang Verlag, Augsburg 2016, ISBN 978-3-945732-10-6

=== English translations ===
Four of his World War II diaries have been translated and published in English as:

- A German Officer in Occupied Paris: The War Journals 1941–1945: First Paris Journal, Notes from the Caucasus, Second Paris Journal, Kirchhorst Diaries.
  - Jünger, Ernst (2019). A German Officer in Occupied Paris: the war journals, 1941-1945. Translated by Thomas S. Hansen; Abby J. Hansen. New York: Columbia University Press. ISBN 978-0-231-12740-0.

The bulk of Jünger's publications remains untranslated, but some of his major novels have appeared in English translation.

- Jünger, Ernst (1929). Storm of Steel. Translated by Creighton, Basil. London: Chatto & Windus.
- Das Wäldchen 125: Basil Creighton, Copse 125: A Chronicle from the Trench Warfare of 1918. London: Chatto & Windus (1930).
- Auf den Marmorklippen: Stuart Hood, On the Marble Cliffs. London: John Lehmann (1947).
- Der Friede: Stuart Hood, The Peace. Hinsdale, IL: Henry Regnery Company (1948).
- Afrikanische Spiele, Stuart Hood, African Diversions. London: John Lehmann (1954).
- Gläserne Bienen: Louise Bogan and Elizabeth Mayer, The Glass Bees. New York: Noonday Press (1960).
- Annäherungen. Drogen Und Rausch: 'Drugs and Ecstasy' in: Myths and Symbols. Studies in Honor of Mircea Eliade, eds. Joseph M. Kitagawa and Charles H. Long. Chicago and London: The University of Chicago Press (1969), pp. 327–42.
- Aladdins Problem: Joachim Neugroschel, Aladdin's Problem. New York: Marsilio (1992).
- Eumeswil: Joachim Neugroschel, Eumeswil. New York: Marsilio (1993).
- Eine gefährliche Begegnung: Hilary Barr, A Dangerous Encounter. New York: Marsilio (1993).
- Über den Schmerz: David C. Durst, On Pain. New York: Telos Press Publishing (2008).
- Das abenteuerliche Herz. Figuren und Capricios: Thomas Friese, The Adventurous Heart: Figures and Capriccios. Candor, NY: Telos Press Publishing (2012).
- Der Waldgang: Thomas Friese, The Forest Passage. Candor, NY: Telos Press Publishing (2013).
- Besuch auf Godenholm: Annabel Moynihan, Visit to Godenholm. Stockholm: Edda Publishing (2015).
- Sturm: Alexis P. Walker, Sturm. Candor, NY: Telos Press Publishing (2015).
- Der Arbeiter. Herrschaft und Gestalt; Bogdan Costea and Laurence Paul Hemming, The Worker. Dominion and Form. Northwestern University Press (2017)
- In Stahlgewittern: K.J. Elliott, In Storms of Steel. (2022).
- Der Kampf als inneres Erlebnis: K.J. Elliott, War as an Inner Experience. (2022).
- Das Wäldchen 125: K.J. Elliott, Copse 125. (2022).
- Feuer und Blut: K.J. Elliott, Fire and Blood. (2022).

== Filmography ==
- La Guerre d'un seul homme (One Man's War) (1981). Film directed by Edgardo Cozarinsky juxtaposing excerpts from Jünger's World War II diaries during his years in Paris with French propaganda films of the same period.
- 102 Years in the Heart of Europe: A Portrait of Ernst Jünger (102 år i hjärtat av Europa) (1998), Swedish documentary film by Jesper Wachtmeister and Björn Cederberg

== Bibliography ==
- Barnouw, Dagmar (1988), Weimar Intellectuals and the Threat of Modernity, Bloomington: Indiana University Press
- Biro, Matthew (1994), "The new man as cyborg: Figures of technology in Weimar visual culture", New German Critique, 62 (62): 71–110, doi:10.2307/488510, JSTOR 488510
- Boyle, Nicholas (28 February 2008). German Literature: A Very Short Introduction. Oxford: Oxford University Press.
- Bullock, Marcus P (1992), The Violent Eye: Ernst Jünger's Visions and Revisions on the European Right, Wayne State University Press, ISBN 0-8143-2334-0.
- Bullock, Marcus. "Ernst Jünger." (2000), Encyclopedia of German Literature, Volume 2 J – Z, ed. Matthias Konzett, Chicago: Fitzroy Dearborn.
- François, Stéphane (24 August 2009). "Qu'est ce que la Révolution Conservatrice ?". Fragments sur les Temps Présents (in French).
- Garland, Mary; Garland, Henry (1997a), "Ernst Jünger", in Garland, Mary (ed.), Companion to German Literature, Oxford: Oxford University Press.
- Garland, Mary; Garland, Henry (1997b), "In Stahlgewittern", in Garland, Mary (ed.), Companion to German Literature, Oxford: Oxford University Press
- Godshall, Kevin (2012). "Storm of Steel". Modernism Lab. Yale University.
- Griffiths, Richard (2006). "JUNGER, ERNST (1895-1998)". In Blamires, Cyprian (ed.). World Fascism. ABC-CLIO. pp. 358–359. ISBN 978-1-57607-940-9.
- Hajduk, Thomas (2008). With a Little Help from My Friends: Ernst Jünger and His Network in the Post-War Period (PDF) (Master's thesis). Durham University.
- Hervier, Julien (1995), The Details of Time: Conversations With Ernst Jünger, Marsilio, ISBN 0-941419-95-9.
- Hoffacker, Ursula (1992). "Ernst Jünger". Biographisch-Bibliographisches Kirchenlexikon (in German). Vol. 3. Archived from the original on 16 June 2007.
- Hofmann, Michael (2003). "Introduction". In Jünger, Ernst (ed.). Storm of Steel. London: Penguin.
- Herf, Jeffrey (1984), Reactionary Modernism (Chapter Four), New York: Cambridge University Press.
- Huyssen, Andreas (Spring–Summer 1993), "Fortifying the Heart—Totally: Ernst Jünger's Armored Texts", New German Critique, 59 (59): 3–23, doi:10.2307/488219, JSTOR 488219.
- Keegan, John (1998). The First World War. London: Hutchinson. ISBN 0-09-180178-8.
- Kiesel, Helmuth (2009). Ernst Jünger: Die Biographie (in German). Munich: Siedler Verlag. ISBN 9783641023485.
- Kiesel, Helmuth (1 March 2024). "Jünger, Ernst". Deutsche Biographie (in German). Historische Kommission bei der Bayerischen Akademie der Wissenschaften.
- Kock, Sonja; Imwolde, Janca (14 September 2014). "Ernst Jünger 1895–1998". Lebendiges Museum Online (in German). Deutsches Historisches Museum.
- Kühl, Richard (8 October 2014). "Jünger, Ernst". In Daniel, Ute; Gatrell, Peter; Janz, Oliver; Jones, Heather; Keene, Jennifer D.; Kramer, Alan; Nasson, Bill (eds.). 1914-1918-online. International Encyclopedia of the First World War. Berlin: Freie Universität Berlin. doi:10.15463/ie1418.10295.
- King, John (1999). Writing and Rewriting the First World War: Ernst Jünger and the Crisis of the Conservative Imagination, 1914–25 (D.Phil. thesis). St John's College, Oxford.
- Kittler, Wolf (Spring 2008). "From Gestalt to Ge-Stell: Martin Heidegger Reads Ernst Jünger". Cultural Critique (69). University of Minnesota Press: 79–97. JSTOR 25475477.
- Loos, Gerharde (1974), Ernst Jünger, Twayne Publishers, ISBN 0-80572479-6.
- Martus, Steffen (2016). Ernst Jünger (in German).
- Meaney, Thomas (March 2023). "History's Fool: The long century of Ernst Jünger". Harper's Magazine.
- Merlio, Gilbert (1992). "La Révolution conservatrice : contre-révolution ou révolution d'un nouveau type". In Gangl, Manfred; Roussel, Hélène (eds.). Les intellectuels et l'État sous la République de Weimar. Les Editions de la MSH. ISBN 978-2-7351-0541-0.
- Merlio, Gilbert (2003). "Y a-t-il eu une " Révolution conservatrice " sous la République de Weimar ?". Revue Française d'Histoire des Idées Politiques. 1 (17): 123–141. doi:10.3917/rfhip.017.0123.
- Mitchell, Allan (May 2011), The Devil's Captain: Ernst Jünger in Nazi Paris, 1941–1944, Berghahn Books, ISBN 978-0-85745-114-9.
- Neaman, Elliot Y (1999), A Dubious Past: Ernst Jünger and the Politics of Literature After Nazism, University of California, Berkeley, ISBN 0-520-21628-8
- Neaman, Elliot Y (21 February 2019). "Ernst Jünger and Storms of Steel". In Sedgwick, Mark (ed.). Key Thinkers of the Radical Right: Behind the New Threat to Liberal Democracy. pp. 22–35.
- Nevin, Thomas (1996), Ernst Jünger and Germany: Into the Abyss, 1914–1945, Duke University Press, ISBN 0-8223-1879-2
- Schiff, Nick (June 2024). From “Total Destruction” to “Total Dictatorship”: The Influence of Ernst Jünger’s Visionary Fascism (Master's thesis). The Graduate Center, City University of New York.
- Schloßberger, Matthias (2001). "Ernst Jünger und die "Konservative Revolution". Überlegungen aus Anlaß der Edition seiner politischen Schriften" [Ernst Jünger and the "Conservative Revolution". Considerations on the occasion of the edition of his political writings]. iaslonline.de (in German).
- Schwilk, Heimo, ed. (2010). Ernst Jünger: Leben und Werk in Bildern und Texten (in German). Klett-Cotta.
- Stern, JP (1953), Ernst Jünger, A Writer of Our Time, Studies in Modern European Literature and Thought, Cambridge: Bowes & Bowes.
- Strathausen, Carsten (2000), "The Return of the Gaze: Stereoscopic Vision in Jünger and Benjamin", New German Critique, 80 (80): 125–148, doi:10.2307/488636, JSTOR 488636.
- Woods, Roger (1982), Ernst Jünger and the Nature of Political Commitment, Stuttgart.
- Woods, Roger (2006). "Ernst Jünger, the New Nationalists, and the Memory of the First World War". In Leydecker, Karl (ed.). German Novelists of the Weimar Republic: Intersections of Literature and Politics. Boydell & Brewer. pp. 125–140. ISBN 9781571132888.
- Zabecki, David T. (8 December 2017). "Valor: The Last Blue Max". HistoryNet.
- Hervier, Julien, Ernst Jünger: dans les tempêtes du siècle, Fayard, Paris, 2014
