= Heimo Schwilk =

German journalist and writer

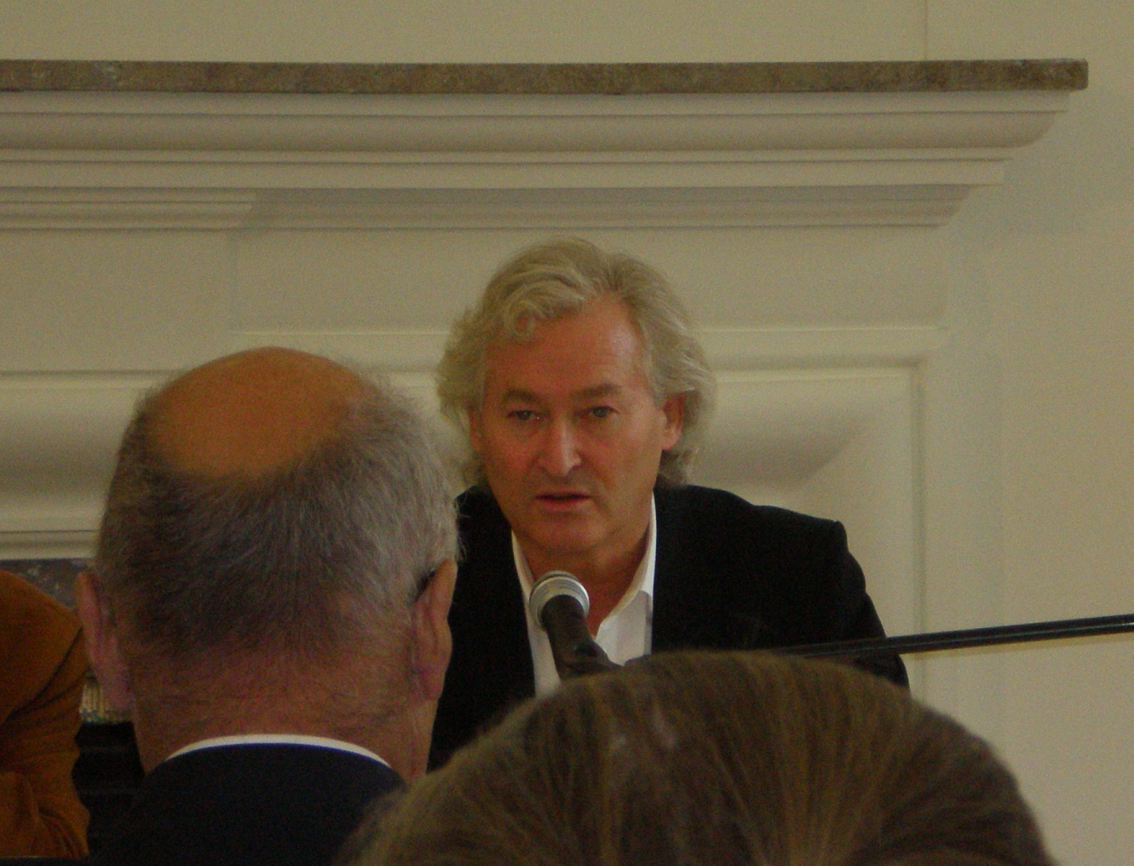
Heimo Schwilk in 2008

Heimo Schwilk (born 23 October 1952) is a German journalist and writer.

== Life and works ==
Heimo Schwilk was born in Stuttgart on 23 October 1952. He is a journalist and writer, active as a senior reporter for Welt am Sonntag.

With Ulrich Schacht, Schwilk co-edited the anthology Die selbstbewusste Nation (1994), which was received as something of a manifesto from the Neue Rechte, of which Schwilk can be regarded as one of the more mainstream-integrated members. Roger Woods writes that Schwilk's political views are visible in his journalism, where he "writes about the decline of bourgeois society into selfishness and chaos, and the possible renaissance of a society based on notions of honour, duty and sacrifice".

Schwilk published a biography on Ernst Jünger in 2007, Ernst Jünger. Ein Jahrhundertleben. Die Biografie. In 2012 he published a book on Hermann Hesse, Hermann Hesse. Das Leben des Glasperlenspielers.

== Published works ==
- Ernst Jünger. Leben und Werk in Bildern und Texten, Klett-Cotta 1988
- Das Echo der Bilder. Ernst Jünger zu Ehren, Klett-Cotta 1990
- Wendezeit – Zeitenwende. Beiträge zur Literatur der achtziger Jahre, Bouvier 1991
- Was man uns verschwieg. Der Golfkrieg in der Zensur, Ullstein 1991
- Die selbstbewusste Nation. „Anschwellender Bocksgesang“ und weitere Beiträge zu einer deutschen Debatte, Ullstein 1994
- Magie der Heiterkeit. Ernst Jünger zum Hundertsten, Klett-Cotta 1995 (zusammen mit Günter Figal)
- Herausgeber der Reihe Dichter sehen ihre Stadt u. a. m. Walter Kempowski, Jürgen Hultenreich, Ulrich Schacht, Ullstein 1994
- Für eine Berliner Republik. Streitschriften, Reden, Essays, München 1997 (zusammen mit Ulrich Schacht)
- Hans-Georg Gadamer. La Filosofia nella crisi del moderno, Herrenhaus 2000 (zusammen mit Günter Figal)
- Il mio cuore avventuroso. Passaggi nel fuoco e nel ghiaccio, Herrenhaus 2001
- Die Stadt der Kinder, Book on Demand 2003
- Die Türen zum Glück, Langen Müller 2007
- Ernst Jünger. Ein Jahrhundertleben. Die Biografie, Piper 2007
- Hermann Hesse: Das Leben des Glasperlenspielers, Piper, München 2012, ISBN 978-3-492-05302-0.
- Ernst Jünger: Feldpostbriefe an die Familie 1915–1918, Klett-Cotta, Stuttgart 2014, ISBN 978-3-608-93950-7.
- Rilke und die Frauen. Biografie eines Liebenden, Piper 2015, ISBN 978-3-492-05637-3.
- Luther. Der Zorn Gottes, Blessing, München 2017, ISBN 978-3-89667-522-4.
- Mein abenteuerliches Herz (I), Manuscriptum, 2021, ISBN 978-3-948075-34-7
