= Eumeswil =

1977 novel by Ernst Jünger

- Cover of the first edition
- Author: Ernst Jünger
- Translator: Joachim Neugroschel
- Cover artist: Heinz Edelmann
- Language: German
- Publisher: Klett-Cotta
- Publication date: 1977
- Publication place: West Germany
- English publication date: 1993
- Pages: 434
- ISBN: 9783129041703

Eumeswil is a 1977 novel by the German author Ernst Jünger. The narrative is set in an undatable post-apocalyptic world, somewhere in present-day Morocco. It follows the inner and outer life of Manuel Venator, a historian in the city-state of Eumeswil who also holds a part-time job in the night bar of Eumeswil's ruling tyrant, the Condor. The book was published in English in 1993, translated by Joachim Neugroschel.

== Themes ==
The key theme in the novel is the figure of the Anarch, the inwardly-free individual who lives quietly and dispassionately within but not of society and the world. The Anarch is a metaphysical ideal figure of a sovereign individual, conceived by Jünger. Jünger was greatly influenced by egoist thinker Max Stirner. Indeed, the Anarch starts out from Stirner's conception of the unique (der Einzige), a man who forms a bond around something concrete rather than ideal, but it is then developed in subtle but critical ways beyond Stirner's concept.

The Anarch is the positive counterpart of the anarchist.

I am an anarch – not because I despise authority, but because I need it. Likewise, I am not a nonbeliever, but a man who demands something worth believing in.

Although I am an anarch, I am not anti-authoritarian. Quite the opposite: I need authority, although I do not believe in it. My critical faculties are sharpened by the absence of the credibility that I ask for. As a historian, I know what can be offered.

The Anarch is to the anarchist, what the monarch is to the monarchist.

— Ernst Jünger

== Reception ==
Publishers Weekly reviewed the book in 1994: "In this acute if labyrinthine study of a compromised individual, [Jünger] telescopes past and present, playing over the sweep of Western history and culture with a dazzling range of allusions from Homer and Nero to Poe and Lenin, displaying his erudition but failing to ignite the reader's engaged interest."
