= On the Marble Cliffs =

1939 German novella by Jünger

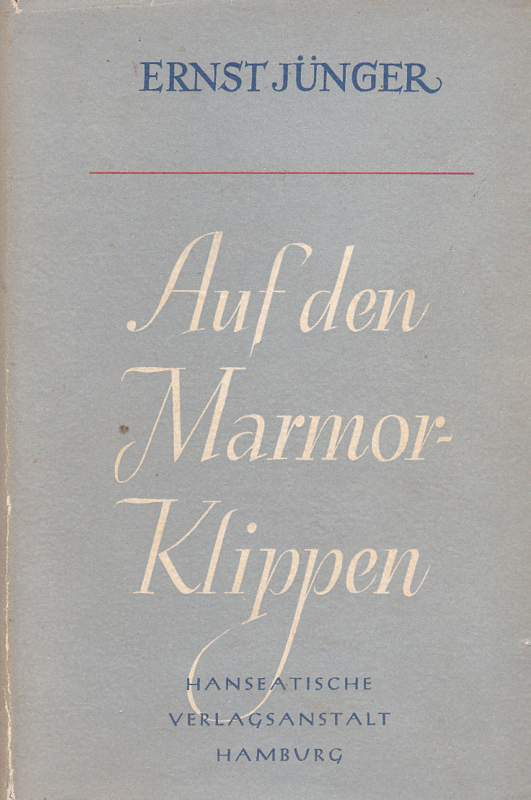
- First German edition, 1939
- Author: Ernst Jünger
- Original title: Auf den Marmorklippen
- Translator: Stuart Hood (1947); Tess Lewis (2023)
- Language: German
- Genre: Speculative fiction
- Publisher: Hanseatische Verlagsanstalt, Hamburg
- Publication date: 1939
- Publication place: Germany
- English publication date: 1947
- Media type: Print (Hardcover)
- Pages: 106
- ISBN: 3-608-93485-5
- OCLC: 255948132
- Preceded by: Afrikanische Spiele, (African games)
- Followed by: Heliopolis

On the Marble Cliffs (German: Auf den Marmorklippen) is a novella by Ernst Jünger published in 1939 describing the upheaval and ruin of a serene agricultural society. It was published that year by Hanseatische Verlagsanstalt in Hamburg, Germany.

== Synopsis ==
The peaceful and traditional agricultural people, located on the shores of a large bay, are surrounded by the rough pastoral folk in the surrounding hills, who feel increasing pressure from the unscrupulous and lowly followers of the dreaded head forester. The narrator and protagonist lives on the marble cliffs as a botanist with his son Erio from a past relationship, his brother Otho, and Erio's grandmother Lampusa. The idyllic life is threatened by the erosion of values and traditions, losing its inner power. The head forester uses this opportunity to establish a new order based on dictatorial rule, large numbers of mindless followers and the use of violence, torture and murder.

The tale may readily be understood as a parable on national socialism, the evil and "jovial" head forester being Hermann Göring. Others see it as a description of Germany's fight against the threat of Stalinism or communism, the head forester (or "chief ranger") being Joseph Stalin. Following this interpretation the book would have predicted in 1939 the ultimate failure of Germany's imminent war against the Soviet Union. The book was not initially censored in Nazi Germany, perhaps due to Jünger's significant repute in right-wing circles, perhaps even due to Hitler's opposition. However, in 1942, it faced censorship by the Gestapo.

Its sharp disapproval of violent masses, as well as its prediction or description of death camps, was noted and helped Jünger's rehabilitation after the Second World War although he had not gone into exile like most anti-Nazi authors. Jünger himself, however, refused the notion that the book was a statement of resistance, describing it rather as a "shoe that fits various feet".

The work is typical for Jünger's Aestheticism that responds to destruction with placidity. It displays the determination to conserve values even in the face of annihilation, perhaps all the more so because the victory of the mindless masses follows brutalization as a virtual force of nature.

== Legacy ==
The novella was the basis for the 2002 opera Auf den Marmorklippen composed by Giorgio Battistelli.
