= Will-Erich Peuckert =

Silesian folklorist (1895–1969)

Will-Erich Peuckert (11 May 1895 – 25 October 1969) was a German folklorist.

== Life ==
Peuckert was born in Töppendorf in Lower Silesia on 11 May 1895. He studied History and Volkskunde at the University of Breslau, where he delivered his dissertation, and went on teach at the Pedagogical Academy in Breslau. There he began to make a name for himself through several publications on German and Silesian folklore. Before he reached professorship, a defamation campaign pressed by a colleague convinced the Nazi authorities to revoke his teaching permissions in 1935. Peuckert doggedly refused to compromise his work with Nazi pressure, an attitude rewarded after the war when he was appointed as a professor at the University of Göttingen and became chair of Volkskunde, the only such position in Germany for many years.

In 1947, an automobile accident killed his wife and left Peuckert completely blind in his right eye and three-quarters blind in his left. He not only continued to teach, but also to publish. He continued to work after a stroke in 1963 left him unable to type with nine of his fingers. He would die of a second stroke in 1969.

== Witchcraft controversy ==
In Bremen in 1959, Peuckert gave a lecture on ointments with hallucinogenic properties that were prepared and used by witches to leave their bodies and travel in the night. As a brief aside, he mentioned that he had once tried such an ointment himself and achieved results entirely compatible with the out-of-body experiences testified to by the witches. This sentence gave rise to an uproar, as papers made claims he himself practiced witchcraft and flew through the night.
