= Copse 125 =

1924 book by Ernst Jünger

- Author: Ernst Jünger
- Original title: Das Wäldchen 125
- Translator: Basil Creighton
- Language: German
- Genre: war memoir
- Publisher: E.S. Mittler & Sohn
- Publication date: October 1924
- Publication place: Germany
- English publication date: 1930
- Pages: 254

Copse 125: A Chronicle from the Trench Warfare of 1918 (German: Das Wäldchen 125. Eine Chronik aus den Grabenkämpfen 1918) is a World War I memoir by the German writer Ernst Jünger, first published by E.S. Mittler & Sohn in October 1924 and revised by Jünger in 1935.

== Summary ==
Copse 125 is based on Jünger's wartime diaries and is seen as a spin off of his more famous 1920 memoir Storm of Steel. It covers the period 30 June to 10 August 1918 and the author's participation in the Operation Michael at Cambrai and the Second Battle of Bapaume. A central location in the narrative is copse 125 located between Puisieux and Gommecourt in Pas-de-Calais.

Jünger's stated goal with Copse 125 was to use his episodic material about World War I to reach something universal. The book stresses both the human element of the war, by depicting a small group of men who held out for a long time, and how technology determines war and shapes men.

== Reception ==
The scholar Thomas Nevin writes that Copse 125 is more constrained than Storm of Steel, has "a peculiar fervor" and is written with "naive ruggedness". According to Nevin, it "approximates the 'undefeated in the field' apologetics of Germany's postwar officer class".
