= The Peace (essay) =

1943 essay by Ernst Jünger

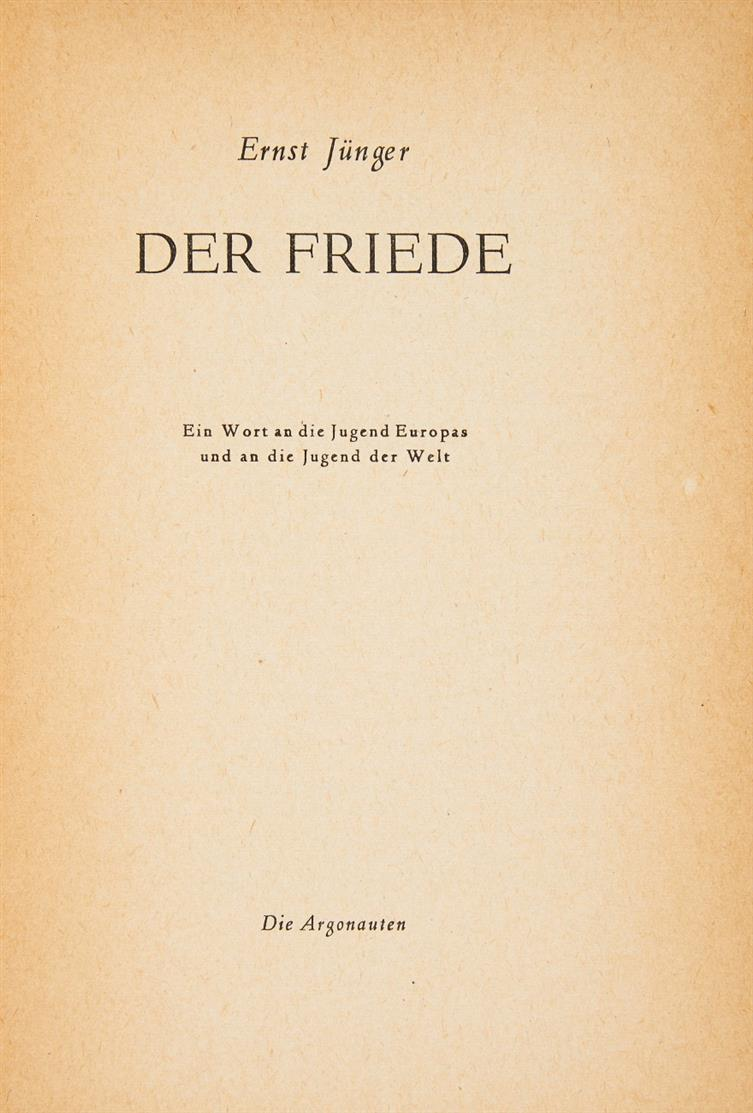
Cover of an early edition

"The Peace" (German: Der Friede. Ein Wort an die Jugend Europas. Ein Wort an die Jugend der Welt, lit. 'The Peace: A Word to the Youth of Europe: A Word to the Youth of the World') is an essay by the German writer Ernst Jünger. It was intended for Allied readers in the event of a German rebellion against the Nazi Party during World War II. It lays out a peace proposal and further visions that involve the creation of a European federation, which could take inspiration from Switzerland and the United States. Similarly to Novalis in Christianity or Europe, Jünger argued that serious engagement with theology is more important than a constitution for upholding peace in Europe.

The text marked Jünger's last direct involvement in political life. According to his diaries, he finished the final revisions on 9 November 1943. Illegal typescripts of the text circulated in Germany toward the end of the war. Unofficial prints were created from 1945 until the first authorised version was published by Verlag Die Argonauten in Amsterdam in 1948.
