= Marcel Jouhandeau =

French writer (1888–1979)

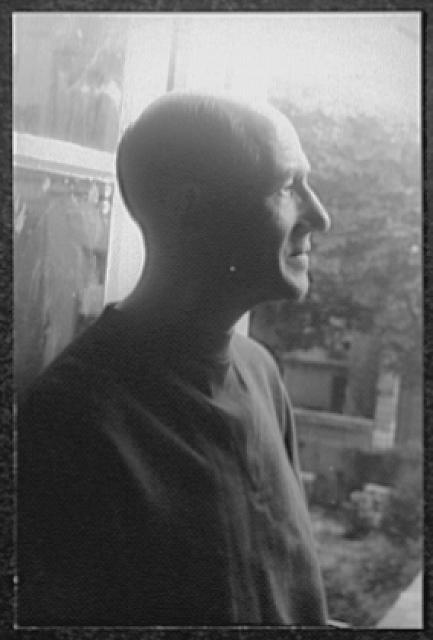
- Born: 26 July 1888
- Died: 7 April 1979 (aged 90)
- Occupation: Writer

Marcel Jouhandeau (French pronunciation: [maʁsɛl ʒuɑ̃do]; 26 July 1888 – 7 April 1979) was a French writer.

== Biography ==
Born in Guéret, Creuse, France, Marcel Jouhandeau grew up in a family of primarily women presided over by his grandmother. Under the influence of a young woman from the Carmel of Limoges, he embraced a spiritual form of Catholicism and considered entering the orders for a time. However, in 1908 he left for Paris where he studied first at the Lycée Henri-IV, and then at the Sorbonne, where he began to write. In 1912 he became a professor at a school in Passy.

In his youth, Marcel Jouhandeau began experiencing homosexual urges. Although he felt guilty and believed he was offending God, his feelings of shame did not prevent him from engaging in numerous homosexual acts. Throughout his life, Jouhandeau alternated between celebrating the male body and spiritually mortifying himself in shame over his sexuality. In 1914, during a spiritual crisis, he burned his manuscripts and attempted suicide. Once the crisis had passed, he turned again to writing. He created Pincegrain, the village chronicles that brought him his first literary success.

During World War I, he was a secretary in his hometown of Guéret. In 1924, he published Pincegrain, a chronicle of the inhabitants of Guéret, which shocked the people of the town. His voyages became an opportunity to indulge in homosexuality, experiences from which he later drew in L'Amateur d'imprudence.

At age 40, he married a dancer, Élisabeth (Elise) Toulemont, known as Caryathis, the former mistress of Charles Dullin and an intimate friend of Jean Cocteau and Max Jacob. She hoped to rid him of his homosexual leanings. During this period he undertook a work of Christian moralism (De l'abjection) before, much to the dismay of his wife, tumbling again into the arms of men, which he wrote about in Chronique d'une passion, Éloge de la volupté and Tirésias.

Nevertheless, Jouhandeau and his wife adopted a girl named Céline, who gave birth to Jouhandeau's grandson, Marc. Following Élise's death in 1971, Jouhandeau lived his last days in Rueil-Malmaison with Marc.

In 1938, Jouhandeau published four anti-Semitic articles in a short volume, "Le Péril Juif" (The Jewish Peril). During the Nazi occupation of France, he accepted Goebbels' invitation to visit Germany. After the Liberation Jouhandeau was interrogated by French authorities on grounds of collaboration but he was acquitted.

== Bibliography ==
- La jeunesse de Théophile (1921)
- Les Pincengrain (1924)
- Prudence Hautechaume (1927)
- Monsieur Godeau intime (1926)
- L'amateur d'imprudence (1932)
- Monsieur Godeau marié (1933)
- Chaminadour (1934–1941)
- Algèbre des valeurs morales (1935)
- Le Peril Juif, Éditions Sorlot, 1938.
- Chroniques maritales (1938)
- De l'abjection (1939)
- Essai sur moi-même (1947)
- Scènes de la vie conjugale (1948)
- Mémorial (1948)
- La faute plutôt que le scandale (1949)
- Chronique d'une passion (1949)
- Eloge de la volupté (1951)
- Dernières années et mort de Véronique (1953)
- Contes d'enfer (1955)
- Léonara ou les dangers de la vertu (1955)
- Carnets de l'écrivain (1957)
- L'école des filles (1960)
- Journaliers (1961–1978)
- Les instantanés de la mémoire (1962)
- Trois crimes rituels (1962)
- Le Pur Amour (1970)
- Pages égarées (1980)
