= The Adventurous Heart =

1929 literary work by Ernst Jünger

- Author: Ernst Jünger
- Original title: Das abenteuerliche Herz
- Language: German
- Genre: Short prose
- Publication date: 1929
- Publication place: Germany
- ISBN: 978-0-914386-48-3

The Adventurous Heart (German: Das abenteuerliche Herz) was a collection of short works by Ernst Jünger. It was first published in 1929 as Aufzeichnungen bei Tag und Nacht (transl. Recordings by Day and Night). Jünger substantially rewrote the work for a second version, published in 1938 as Figuren und Capriccios (transl. Figures and Capriccios), which differs considerably from the original.

In 1929 he was an established German nationalist polemical writer and this was seen as a different way of achieving the Conservative Revolution from his previous work. It was his first foray into fiction and established his literary reputation as an author of magical realism, and influenced by the Decadent movement. It is regarded as his best work by even many of his detractors.

The 2009 theatrical work Das Abenteuerliche Herz: Droge und Rausch was partially based on the book.

== Sources ==
- Kühl, Richard (8 October 2014). "Jünger, Ernst". In Daniel, Ute; Gatrell, Peter; Janz, Oliver; Jones, Heather; Keene, Jennifer D.; Kramer, Alan; Nasson, Bill (eds.). 1914-1918-online. International Encyclopedia of the First World War. Berlin: Freie Universität Berlin. doi:10.15463/ie1418.10295.
- Meaney, Thomas (March 2023). "History's Fool: The long century of Ernst Jünger". Harper's Magazine.
