= War as an Inner Experience =

1922 essay by Ernst Jünger

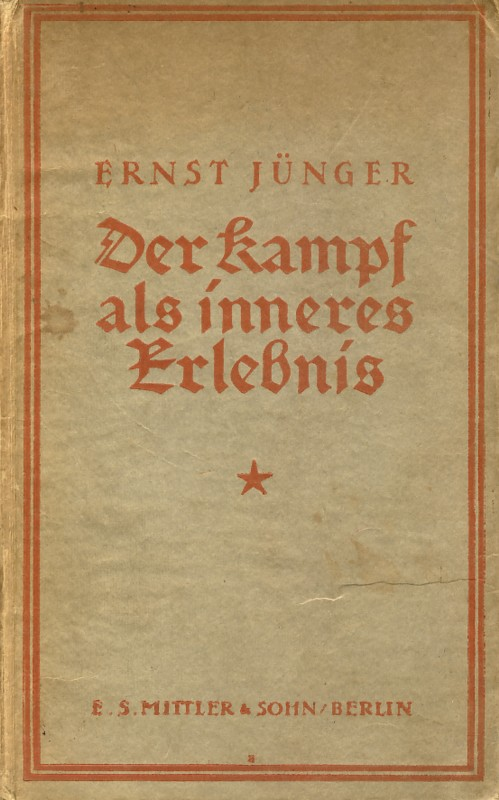
Der Kampf als inneres Erlebnis, 1922

War as an Inner Experience (German: Der Kampf als inneres Erlebnis) is an essay by Ernst Jünger, first published in 1922.
