= The Worker: Dominion and Form =

1932 book by Ernst Jünger

- 2017 edition
- Author: Ernst Jünger
- Original title: Der Arbeiter. Herrschaft und Gestalt
- Translator: Bogdan Costea; Laurence Paul Hemming
- Language: German
- Publisher: Hanseatische Verlagsanstalt
- Publication date: 1932
- Publication place: Germany
- English publication date: 2017
- Pages: 300

The Worker: Dominion and Form (German: Der Arbeiter. Herrschaft und Gestalt) is a 1932 book by the German writer Ernst Jünger.

== Summary ==
Influenced by the experience of World War I and the fragility of the Weimar Republic, Jünger sought to formulate a sustainable model for modern life through something he called the "worker" and described as a "Gestalt". A central argument in the book is that what may appear as nihilism may instead be understood as failures to recognise shifts in the dominating metaphysics of a society. The worker is presented as someone who keeps up with the shift away from the bourgeois order brought in by the Enlightenment. The arguments of the book are related to concepts Jünger had developed in his 1930 essay "Total Mobilisation".

== Reception ==
Scholars and critics have discussed what the book means with its terms "worker" and "Gestalt", and how its content relates to the Enlightenment, bourgeois society, history and the philosophy of Friedrich Nietzsche.

Lothar Baier called the book a "Magna Carta of the Third Reich". Helmuth Kiesel dismisses this view by placing the book in its context of Jünger's views and activities. Kiesel associates The Worker with heroic realism and attempts to mobilise technology in the service of social betterment.

== Legacy ==
The book had significant influence on Martin Heidegger's philosophy of technology.

Jünger published a comment on The Worker in 1964 titled Maxima–Minima. In this and other later works, such as An der Zeitmauer (1959) and Der Weltstaat (1960), he developed his views of technology and the worker. He argued that war is what drives technology and science, and that the logic of war, which is the basis for the logic of the worker, cannot be tamed by rules and laws, and the worker is by extension in conflict with both the nation state and the individual.
