= Deutsche Biographie =

German biographical reference work

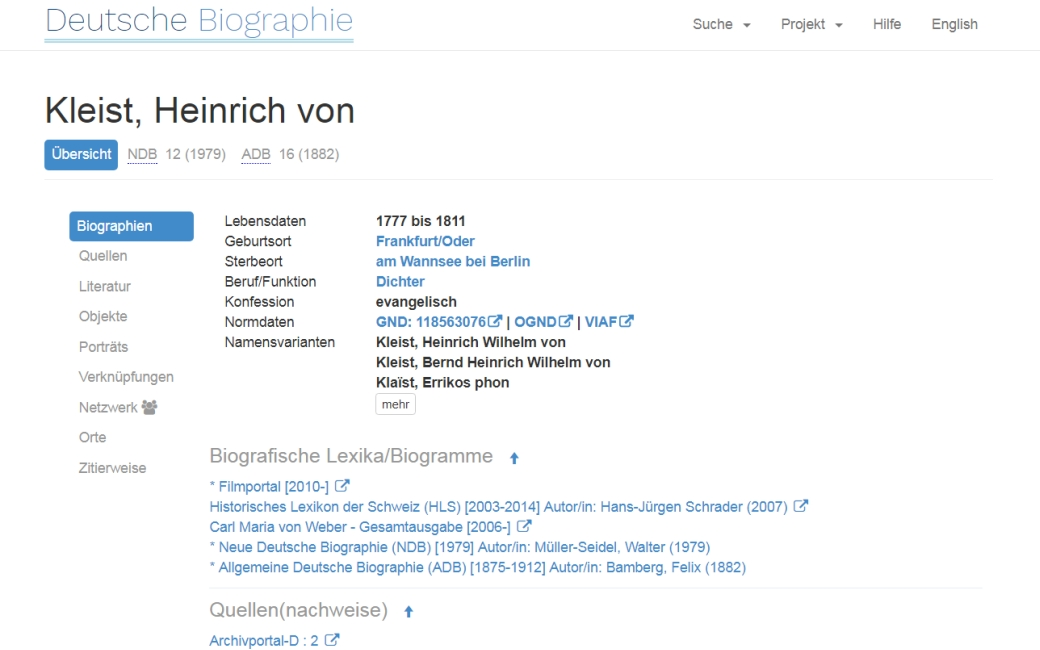
Entry for Heinrich von Kleist

Deutsche Biographie (English: German Biography) is a German-language online biographical dictionary. It published thus far information about more than 730,000 individuals and families (2016). All entries are linked to the Integrated Authority File (GND).

The German Biography also contains the articles from

- Allgemeine Deutsche Biographie (ADB: 1875–1912)
- Neue Deutsche Biographie (NDB: 1953–2023)
- NDB-online (2020–present)
