= Helmuth Kiesel =

German literary studies scholar

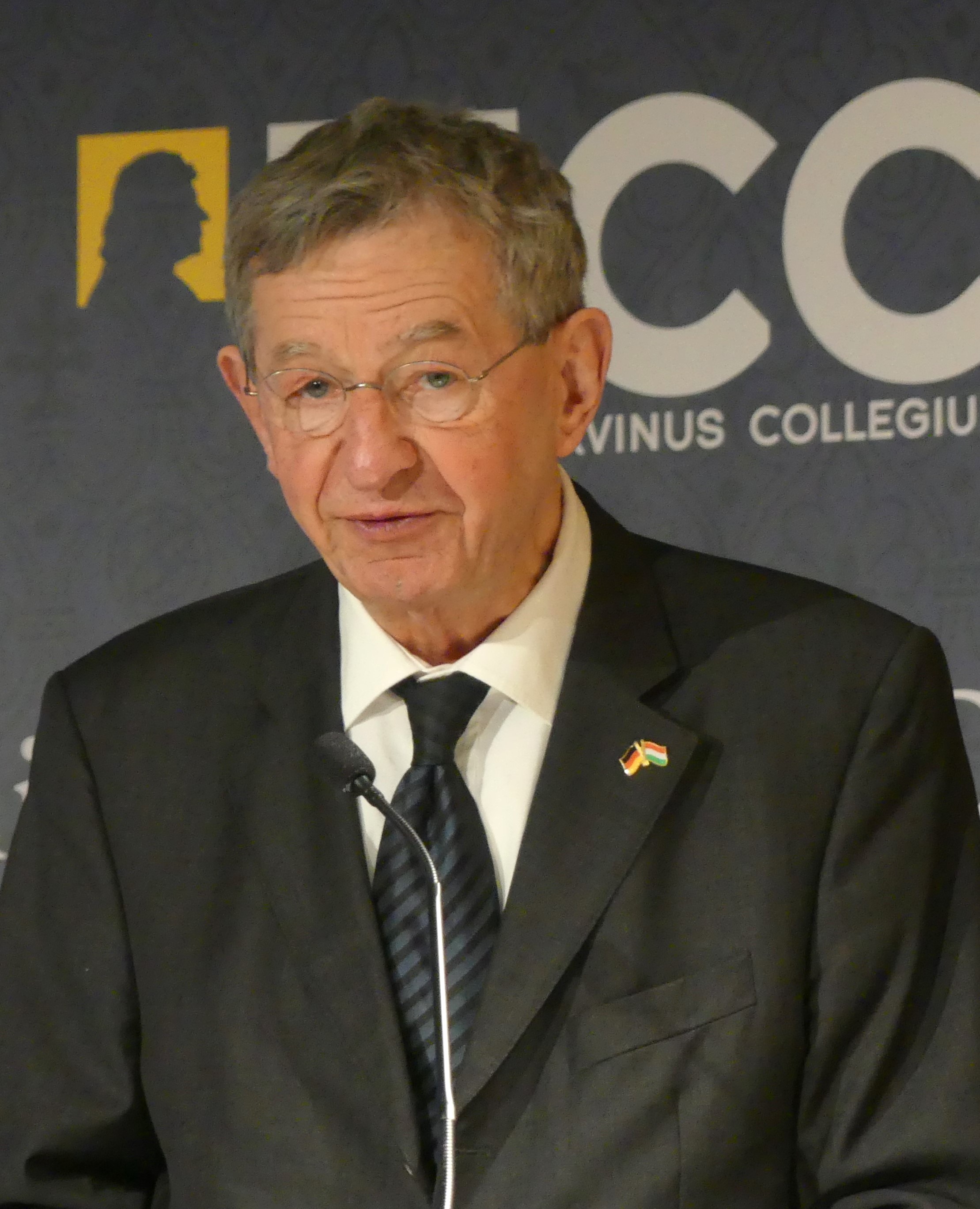
Helmuth Kiesel in 2025

Helmuth Kiesel (born 1 August 1947) is a German literary studies scholar who specializes in German literature from the period 1918 to 1945. He was professor of modern German literature at the University of Bamberg from 1987 to 1990 and at the Heidelberg University from 1990. Since 2015 he has been professor emeritus.

An expert on Ernst Jünger, Kiesel edited and commented Jünger's and Carl Schmitt's correspondence, published by Klett-Cotta Verlag in 1999. Kiesel's 720 pages long biography of Jünger, Ernst Jünger. Die Biografie, was published by Siedler Verlag in 2007.

== Selected bibliography ==
- with Paul Münch: Gesellschaft und Literatur im 18. Jahrhundert. Voraussetzungen und Entstehung des literarischen Markts in Deutschland. Beck, Munich 1977, ISBN 3-406-06661-5.
- „Bei Hof, bei Höll“. Untersuchungen zur literarischen Hofkritik von Sebastian Brant bis Friedrich Schiller. Dissertation. Niemeyer, Tübingen 1979, ISBN 3-484-18056-0.
- Erich Kästner. Beck, Munich 1981, ISBN 3-406-08418-4.
- Literarische Trauerarbeit. Das Exil- und Spätwerk Alfred Döblins. Habilitation thesis. Niemeyer, Tübingen 1986, ISBN 3-484-18089-7.
- Wissenschaftliche Diagnose und dichterische Vision der Moderne. Max Weber und Ernst Jünger. Manutius, Heidelberg 1994, ISBN 3-925678-43-3.
- Geschichte der literarischen Moderne. Sprache, Ästhetik, Dichtung im 20. Jahrhundert. Beck, Munich 2004, ISBN 3-406-51145-7.
- Ernst Jünger. Die Biografie. Siedler, Munich 2007, ISBN 978-3-88680-852-6.
- Geschichte der deutschsprachigen Literatur 1918 bis 1933. C.H. Beck, Munich 2017, ISBN 978-3-406-70799-5.
