= Color terminology for race =

Describing people by skin colour

Skin colour classifications of human groups have been used in historical racial classifications.

The number of categories was long recognized as subjective, and ethnic groups were placed in categories at different points throughout history. François Bernier (1684) questioned the validity of using skin colour as a racial characteristic, Johann Friedrich Blumenbach (1795) was associated with the five-colour categorization "Aethiopian or Black", "Caucasian or White", "Mongolian or Yellow", "American or Red", and "Malayan or Brown" subgroups, and Charles Darwin (1871) emphasized the gradual differences between categories.

There is broad agreement among modern scientists that typological conceptions of race have no scientific basis.

== History ==
=== Antiquity to 1600s ===
Categorization of racial groups by reference to skin color is common in classical antiquity. For example, it is found in e.g. Physiognomica, a Greek treatise dated to c. 300 BC.

The transmission of the "color terminology" for race from antiquity to early anthropology in 17th century Europe took place via rabbinical literature. Specifically, Pirke De-Rabbi Eliezer (a medieval rabbinical text dated roughly to between the 7th to 12th centuries) contains the division of mankind into three groups based on the three sons of Noah, viz. Shem, Ham and Japheth:

"He [Noah] especially blessed Shem and his sons, (making them) black but comely [שחורים ונאים], and he gave them the habitable earth. He blessed Ham and his sons, (making them) black like the raven [שחורים כעורב], and he gave them as an inheritance the coast of the sea. He blessed Japheth and his sons, (making) them entirely white [כלם לבני], and he gave them for an inheritance the desert and its fields" (trans. Gerald Friedlander 1916, p. 172f.)

This division in Rabbi Eliezer and other rabbinical texts is received by Georgius Hornius (1666). In Hornius' scheme, the Japhetites (identified as Scythians, an Iranic ethnic group and Celts) are "white" (albos), the Aethiopians and Chamae are "black" (nigros), and the Indians and Semites are "brownish-yellow" (flavos), and almost all Jews being neither black nor white but "light brown" (buxus, the color of boxwood), following Mishnah Sanhedrin, they accordingly are classified as Semites.

François Bernier in a short article published anonymously in 1684 moves away from the "Noahide" classification, proposes to consider large subgroups of mankind based not on geographical distribution but on physiological differences. Writing in French, Bernier uses the term race, or synonymously espece "kind, species", where Hornius had used tribus "tribe" or populus "people". Bernier explicitly rejects a categorization based on skin color, arguing that the dark skin of Indians is due to exposure to the Sun only, and that the yellowish colour of some Asians, while a genuine feature, is not sufficient to establish a separate category. Instead his first category comprises most of Europe, the Near East and North Africa, including populations in the Nile Valley and the Indian peninsula he describes as being of a near "black" skin tone due to the effect of the sun. His second category includes most of Sub-Saharan Africa, again not exclusively based on skin colour but on physiological features such as the shape of nose and lips. His third category includes Southeast Asia, China and Japan as well as part of Tatarstan (Central Asia and eastern Muscovy). Members of this category are described as white, the categorization being based on facial features rather than skin colour. His fourth category are the Lapps (Lappons), described as a savage race with faces reminiscent of bears (but for which the author admits to rely on hearsay). Finally, the natives of the Americas are considered as a fifth category, described as of "olive" (olivastre) skin tone. The author furthermore considers the possible addition of more categories, specifically the "blacks of the Cape of Good Hope", which seemed to him to be of significantly different build from most other populations below the Sahara.

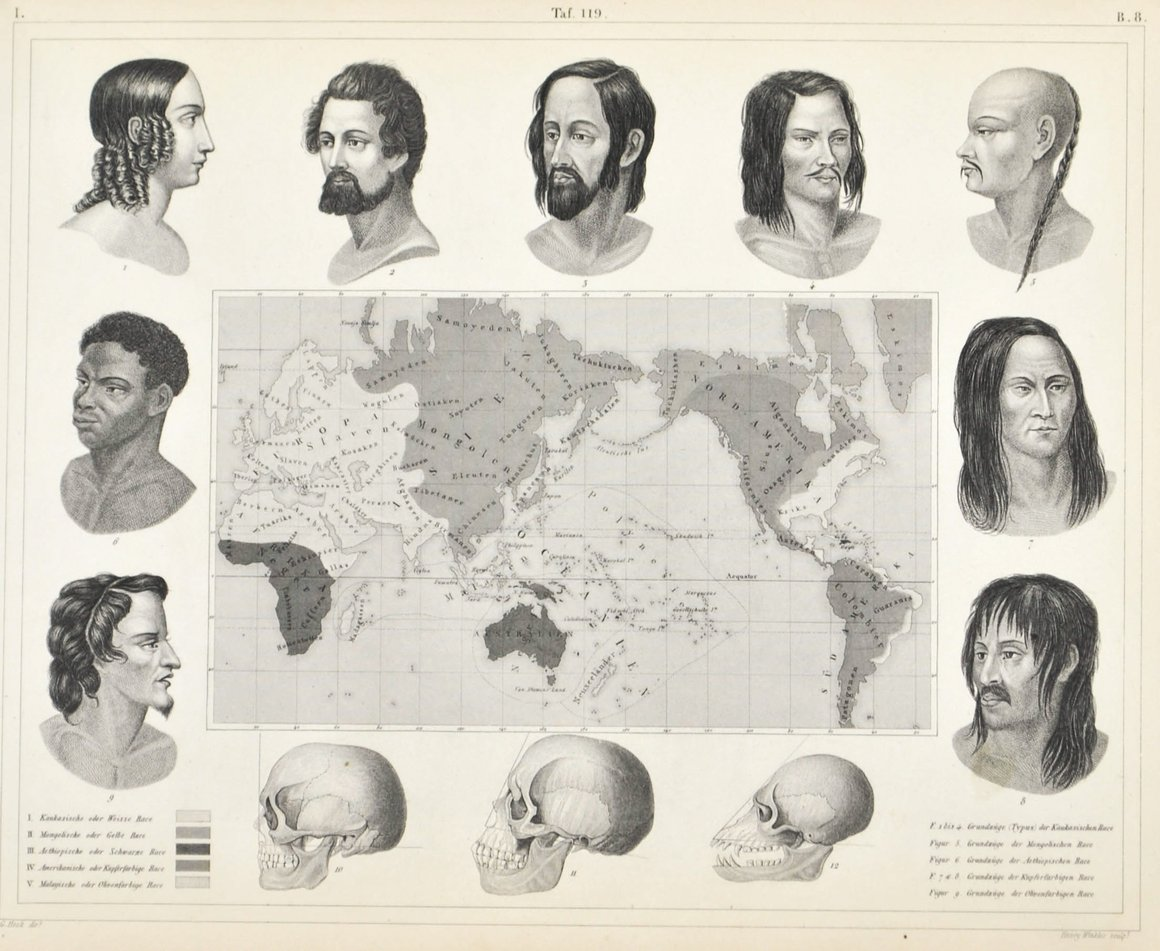
1851 map of Johann Friedrich Blumenbach's five races, labeled "Caucasian or White", "Mongolian or Yellow", "Aethiopian or Black", "American or Red" and "Malayan or Brown"

=== Early Modern physical anthropology ===
In the 1730s, Carl Linnaeus in his introduction of systematic taxonomy recognized four main human subspecies, termed Americanus (Americans), Europaeus (Europeans), Asiaticus (Asians) and Afer (Africans). The physical appearance of each type is briefly described, including colour adjectives referring to skin and hair colour: rufus "red" and pilis nigris "black hair" for Americans, albus "white" and pilis flavescentibus "yellowish hair" for Europeans, luridus "yellowish, sallow", pilis nigricantibus "swarthy hair" for Asians, and niger "black", pilis atris "coal-black hair" for Africans.

The views of Johann Friedrich Blumenbach on the categorization of the major races of mankind developed over the course of the 1770s to 1820s. He introduced a four-fold division in 1775, extended to five in 1779, later borne out in his work on craniology (Decas craniorum, published during 1790–1828). He also used color as the name or main label of the races but as part of the description of their physiology. Blumenbach does not name his five groups in 1779 but gives their geographic distribution. The color adjectives used in 1779 are weiss "white" (Caucasian race), gelbbraun "yellow-brown" (Mongolian race), schwarz "black" (Aethiopian race), kupferrot "copper-red" (American race) and schwarzbraun "black-brown" (Malayan race). Blumenbach belonged to a group known as the Göttingen school of history, which helped to popularize his ideas.

Blumenbach's division and choice of color-adjectives remained influential throughout the 19th and early 20th centuries, with variation depending on author. René Lesson in 1847 presented a division into six groups based on simple color adjectives: White (Caucasian), Dusky (South Asian), Orange (Austronesian), Yellow (East Asian), Red (Indigenous American), Black (African). According to Barkhaus (2006) it was the adoption of both the colour terminology and the French term race by Immanuel Kant in 1775 which proved influential. Kant published an essay Von den verschiedenen Racen der Menschen "On the diverse races of mankind" in 1775, based on the system proposed by Buffon, Histoire Naturelle, in which he recognized four groups, a "white" European race (Race der Weißen), a "black" Negroid race (Negerrace), a copper-red Kalmyk race (kalmuckishe Race) and an olive-yellow Indian race (Hinduische Race).

Two historical anthropologists favored a binary racial classification system that divided people into a light skin and dark skin categories. 18th-century anthropologist Christoph Meiners, who first defined the Caucasian race, posited a "binary racial scheme" of two races with the Caucasian whose racial purity was exemplified by the "venerated... ancient Germans", although he considered some Europeans as impure "dirty whites"; and "Mongolians", who consisted of everyone else. Meiners did not include the Jews as Caucasians and ascribed them a "permanently degenerate nature". Hannah Franzieka identified 19th-century writers who believed in the "Caucasian hypothesis" and noted that "Jean-Julien Virey and Louis Antoine Desmoulins were well-known supports of the idea that Europeans came from Mount Caucasus." In his political history of racial identity, Bruce Baum wrote, "Jean-Joseph Virey (1774–1847), a follower of Christoph Meiners, claimed that "the human races... may divided... into those who are fair and white and those who are dark or black."

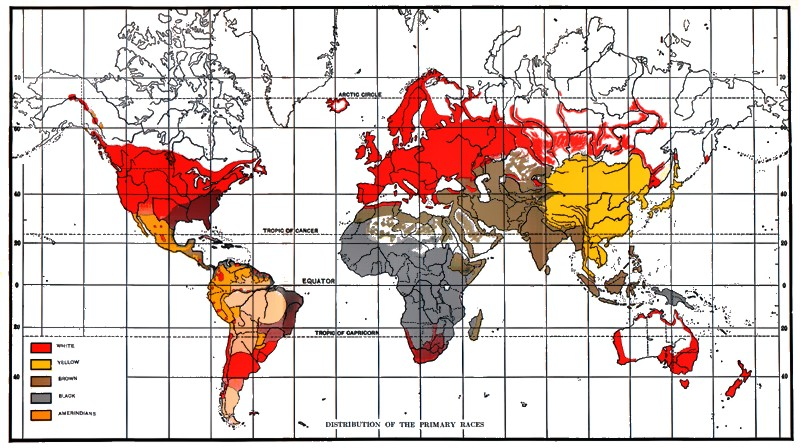
Stoddard's map of the distribution of the five primary races of the world (1920)

Lothrop Stoddard in The Rising Tide of Color Against White World-Supremacy (1920) considered five races: White, Black, Yellow, Brown, and Amerindian (Red). In this explicitly white supremacist exposition of racial categorization, the "white" category is much more limited than in Blumenbach's scheme, essentially restricted to Europeans, while the separate "brown" category is introduced for non-European Caucasoid subgroups in North Africa, Western, Central and South Asia.

=== Racial categories after 1945 ===
The old flag of Suriname (1954–1975) symbolized unity between the five "races" in the country: red (Indigenous Americans), white (Europeans), black (Africans), brown (South Asians and Javanese) and yellow (East Asians).

Following World War II, more and more biologists and anthropologists began to discontinue use of the term "race" due to its association with political ideologies of racism. Thus, The Race Question statement by the UNESCO, in the 1950s, proposed to substitute the term "ethnic groups" to the concept of "race". Categories such as Europid, Mongoloid, Negroid, Australoid remain in use in fields such as forensic anthropology.

Color terminology remains in use in some countries with multiracial populations for the purpose of their official census, as in the United States, where the official categories are "Black", "White", "Asian", "Native American and Alaska Natives" and "Native Hawaiians and Other Pacific Islanders" and in the United Kingdom (since 1991) with official categories "White", "Asian" and "Black". Conversely, it is uncommon in English speaking countries to use "Yellow" to refer to Asian people or "Red" to refer to Indigenous peoples of the Americas. This is due to historic negative associations of the terms (ex. Yellow Peril and Redskin). However, some Asians have tried to reclaim the word by proudly self-identifying as "Yellow". Similarly, some Native Americans have tried to reclaim the term "Red".

Much of the color-based classification relates to groups that were politically significant at different points in US history (e.g., part of a wave of immigrants), and these categories do not have an obvious label for people from other groups, such as people from the Middle East or Central Asia. However, many Middle Eastern and South Asian people in the Anglophone world self-identify as "Brown", considering their skin color central to their identity. Many Hispanics, particularly mestizos, have self-identified as the Bronze race (la raza de bronce) since the 20th century. The term "Olive" has sometimes been used to refer variously to Mediterranean European, West Asian, Latin American, Southeast Asian and North African people.

== Symbolism and uses of color terminology ==
The Martinique-born French Frantz Fanon and African-American writers Langston Hughes, Maya Angelou, and Ralph Ellison, among others, wrote that negative symbolisms surrounding the word "black" outnumber positive ones. They argued that the good vs. bad dualism associated with white and black unconsciously frame prejudiced colloquialisms. In the 1970s the term black replaced Negro in the United States.

=== Tone gradations ===
In some societies people can be sensitive to gradations of skin tone, which may be due to miscegenation or to albinism and which can affect power and prestige. In 1930s Harlem slang, such gradations were described by a tonescale of "high yaller (yellow), yaller, high brown, vaseline brown, seal brown, low brown, dark brown". These terms were sometimes referred to in blues music, both in the words of songs and in the names of performers. In 1920s Georgia, Willie Perryman followed his older brother Rufus in becoming a blues piano player: both were albino Negroes with pale skin, reddish hair and poor eyesight. Rufus was already well established as "Speckled Red", Willie became "Piano Red". The piano player and guitarist Tampa Red from the same state developed his career in Chicago at that time: his name may have come from his light skin tone, or possibly reddish hair.

More recently such categorization has been noted in the Caribbean. It is reported that skin tones play an important role in defining how Barbadians view one another, and they use terms such as "brown skin, light skin, fair skin, high brown, red, and mulatto". An assessment of racism in Trinidad notes people often being described by their skin tone, with the gradations being "HIGH RED – part White, part Black but 'clearer' than Brown-skin: HIGH BROWN – More white than Black, light skinned: DOUGLA – part Indian and part Black: LIGHT SKINNED, or CLEAR SKINNED Some Black, but more White: TRINI WHITE – Perhaps not all White, behaves like others but skin White". In Jamaica, albinism has been stigmatized, but the albino dancehall singer Yellowman took his stage name in protest against such prejudice and has helped to end this stereotype.

=== United States ===
Racial segregation in the United States was based on a binary classification, white vs. non-white, in which "white" was held to imply "purity" so that anyone with even the slightest amount of non-white ancestry was excluded from white privileges, and there could be no category of racially mixed people. In 1896 this doctrine was upheld in the Plessy v. Ferguson Supreme Court case. Traditionally the main distinction was between "white" and "black", but Japanese Americans could be accepted on both sides of the divide. As further racial groups were categorized, "white" became narrowly construed, and everyone else was categorised as a "person of color", suggesting that "white" people have no race, while racial subdivision of those "of color" was unimportant.

At college campus protests during the 1960s, a "Flag of the Races" was in use, with five stripes comprising red, black, brown, yellow, and white tones.

In the 2000 United States census, two of the five self-designated races are labeled by a color. In the 2000 US Census, "White" refers to "person having origins in any of the original peoples of Europe, the Middle East, or North Africa." In the 2000 US Census, "Black or African American" refers to a "person having origins in any of the Black racial groups of Africa."

The other three self-designated races are not labeled by color. This is due to historic negative associations of terms like "Yellow" (for East Asians) and "Red" (for Native Americans) with racism. However, some Asian Americans and Native Americans have tried to reclaim these color terms by self-identifying as "Yellow" and "Red", respectively.

Though not an official color or racial designation in the United States census, "Brown" has been used to describe certain peoples such as Arab Americans and Indian Americans. Many Middle Eastern Americans have criticized the United States Census for denying them a racial designation, as they are classified as "White" by the United States census. Furthermore, though Asian as a racial term in the United States groups together ethnically diverse Asian peoples such as the Chinese, Indians, Filipinos and Japanese, its common usage has been criticized for only referring to East Asians. This has led some South and Southeast Asian Americans to use the term "Brown Asian" to separate themselves from East Asian Americans. Additionally, some Middle Eastern Americans will check “Asian” as their race, as technically, the region of the Middle East is located in Western Asia.

== See also ==
- Biological anthropology (also known as physical anthropology)
