= Pseudomorphosis =

Pseudomorphosis may refer to:

- Pseudomorph, in mineralogy
- Pseudomorphosis (Spengler), a key concept in Oswald Spengler's The Decline of the West
