= Hour of Decision =

Hour of Decision may refer to:

- The Hour of Decision, a 1933 book by Oswald Spengler
- Hour of Decision (radio program), an American radio program, broadcast 1950–2016
- Hour of Decision (film), a 1957 British film
