= Prussianism and Socialism =

1919 book by Oswald Spengler

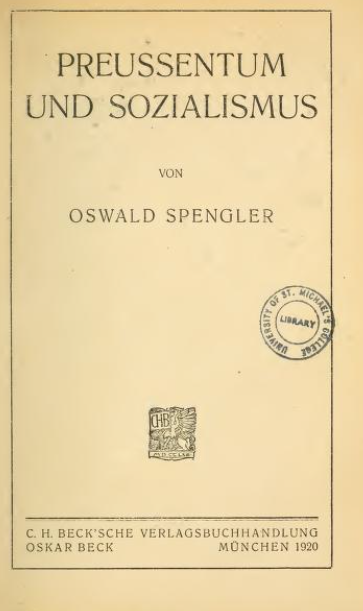
- Title page for Preußentum und Sozialismus (1920)
- Author: Oswald Spengler
- Original title: Preußentum und Sozialismus
- Publication date: 1919

Prussianism and Socialism (German: Preußentum und Sozialismus [ˈpʁɔʏsn̩tuːm ʔʊnt zotsi̯aˈlɪsmʊs]) is a 1919 book by Oswald Spengler originally based on notes intended for the second volume of The Decline of the West, in which he argues for "Prussian" socialism, characterized by an emphasis on social roles rather than capital, in contrast to mainstream socialism, which he refers to as "English" socialism.

Spengler responded to the claim that socialism's rise in Germany had not begun with the German revolution of 1918–1919 but rather in 1914 when Germany waged war, uniting the German nation in a national struggle that he claimed was based on socialistic Prussian characteristics, including creativity, discipline, concern for the greater good, productivity, and self-sacrifice.

In the book, Spengler claimed that these socialistic Prussian qualities were present across Germany and stated that the merger of German nationalism with this form of socialism, while resisting Marxist and internationalist socialism, would be in the interests of Germany. Spengler's Prussian socialism was popular amongst some Germans, especially some conservative revolutionaries who had distanced themselves from traditional conservatism. His notions of Prussian socialism influenced Nazism and the Conservative Revolutionary movement.

== Concepts ==
Spengler utilized the anti-English ideas addressed by Johann Plenge and Werner Sombart during World War I that condemned English liberalism and English parliamentarianism while advocating a nationalist socialism that was free from Marxism that would connect the individual to the state through corporatist organization.

== Prussian character and socialism ==
Spengler described socialism outside of a class conflict perspective and said, "The meaning of socialism is that life is controlled not by the opposition between rich and poor, but by the rank that achievement and talent bestow. That is our freedom, freedom from the economic despotism of the individual." Spengler addressed the need of Germans to accept Prussian socialism to free themselves from foreign forms of government, stating:

Prussiandom and socialism stand together against the inner England, against the world-view that infuses our entire life as a people, crippling it and stealing its soul ... The working class must liberate itself from the illusions of Marxism. Marx is dead. As a form of existence, socialism is just beginning, but the socialism of the German proletariat is at an end. For the worker, there is only Prussian socialism or nothing... For conservatives, there is only conscious socialism or destruction. But we need liberation from the forms of Anglo-French democracy. We have our own.

Spengler went further to demonstrate the difference between priorities held in England and Prussia, stating that "English society is founded on the distinction between rich and poor, Prussian society on the distinction between command and obedience ... Democracy in England means the possibility for everyone to become rich, in Prussia the possibility of attaining to every existing rank." Spengler claimed that Frederick William I of Prussia became the "first conscious socialist" for having founded Prussian tradition of military and bureaucratic discipline. He also claimed that Otto von Bismarck's social policies were socialist in nature, and that they complemented his conservative policies rather than contradicted them as claimed by others.

== Rebuke of Marxism and definition of "true socialism" ==
Spengler denounced Marxism for having developed socialism from an English perspective, while not understanding Germans' socialist nature. In the pamphlet, a central argument is that the corrupt forces promoting English socialism in his country comprised an "invisible English army, which Napoleon had left behind on German soil after the Battle of Jena". Spengler accused Marxism of following the British tradition in which the poor envy the rich, stating: "The socialism of a Fichte would accuse [those who don't work] of sloth, it would brand them as irresponsible, dispensable shirkers and parasites. But Marxian instinct envies them. They are too well-off, and therefore they should be revolted against. Marx has inoculated his proletariat with a contempt for work."

Spengler claimed that Marxism sought to train the proletariat to "expropriate the expropriator", the capitalist, so that the proletariat could live a life of leisure on this expropriation. In summary, Spengler concluded that "Marxism is the capitalism of the working class" and not "true socialism". In contrast to Marxism, Spengler claimed that "true socialism" in its German form "does not mean nationalization through expropriation or robbery". Spengler justified this claim by saying:

In general, it is a question not of nominal possession but of the technique of administration. For a slogan’s sake to buy up enterprises immoderately and purposelessly and to turn them over to public administration in the place of the initiative and responsibility of their owners, who must eventually lose all power of supervision—that means the destruction of socialism. The old Prussian idea was to bring under legislative control the formal structure of the whole national productive force, at the same time carefully preserving the right of property and inheritance, and leaving scope for the kind of personal enterprise, talent, energy, and intellect displayed by an experienced chess player, playing within the rules of the game and enjoying that sort of freedom which the very sway of the rule affords ... Socialization means the slow transformation—taking centuries to complete—of the worker into an economic functionary, and the employer into a responsible supervisory official.

"True socialism" according to Spengler would take the form of a corporatism in which "local corporate bodies organized according to the importance of each occupation to the people as a whole; higher representation in stages up to a supreme council of the state; mandates revocable at any time; no organized parties, no professional politicians, no periodic elections." He also posited that the West will spend the next and last several hundred years of its existence in a state of Caesarian socialism, when all humans will be synergized into a harmonious and happy totality by a dictator, like an orchestra is synergized into a harmonious totality by its conductor.

== Reception ==
Historian Ishay Landa described the nature of "Prussian socialism" as decidedly capitalist. Landa observed that Spengler strongly opposed labor strikes (he described them as "the unsocialistic earmark of Marxism"), trade unions, progressive taxation, or any imposition of taxes on the rich, any shortening of the working day, as well as any form of government insurance for sickness, old age, accidents, or unemployment. At the same time as he rejected any social democratic provisions, Spengler celebrated private property, competition, imperialism, capital accumulation, and "wealth, collected in few hands and among the ruling classes". Landa described Spengler's "Prussian Socialism" as "working a whole lot, for the absolute minimum, but — and this is a vital aspect — being happy about it." He argued against the imposition of progressive taxation on the rich ("dry Bolshevism"), any shortening of the working day (Spengler argued that workers should work even on Sundays), as well as any form of government insurance for sickness, old age, accidents, or unemployment.

According to the German sociologist Stefan Breuer, Spengler was reconciling socialist vocabulary with concepts that were fundamentally economic liberal, more specifically Manchester liberal. Spengler's trick was to declare socialism to be a form of will to power. Spengler believed the workers' movement and the socialism they represented caused global economic crisis and mass unemployment and that the direct result of this worker socialism led to wage dictates and "tax Bolshevism" in industrialized countries. Breuer described in the view of this assignment that "it is not surprising that the genuine, i.e. Prussian Socialism proclaimed by Spengler had extremely liberal features" and "this socialism presupposed a private economy with its old-Germanic joy in power."
