= The Rising Tide of Color Against White World-Supremacy =

Book by Lothrop Stoddard

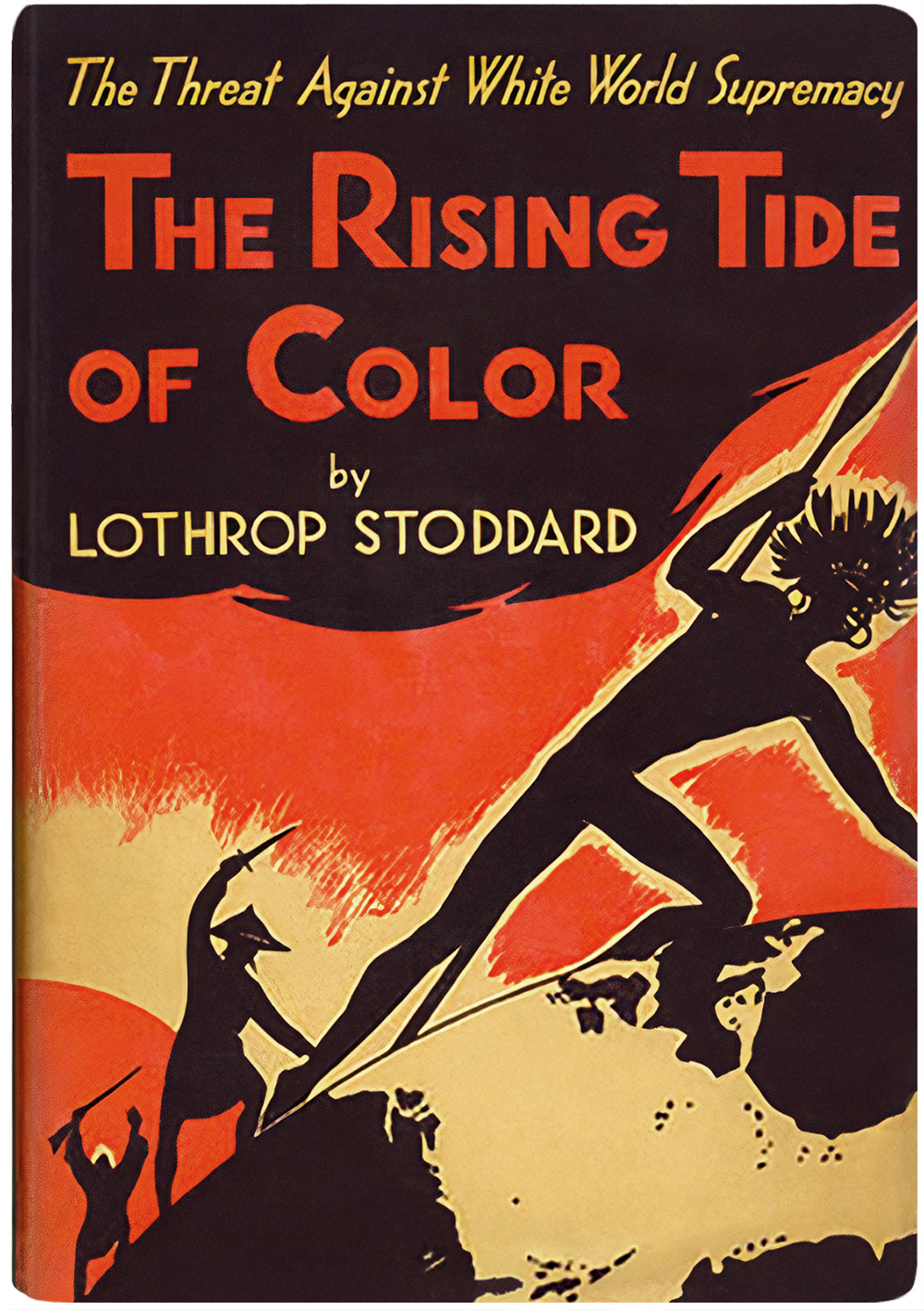
- First edition, 1920
- Author: Lothrop Stoddard
- Language: English
- Subject: Geopolitics, racial theory
- Publisher: Charles Scribner's Sons
- Publication date: 1920
- Publication place: United States
- Media type: Print
- Pages: 320 (1st edition)
- OCLC: 1572150
- Dewey Decimal: 323.1
- LC Class: HT1521 .S7

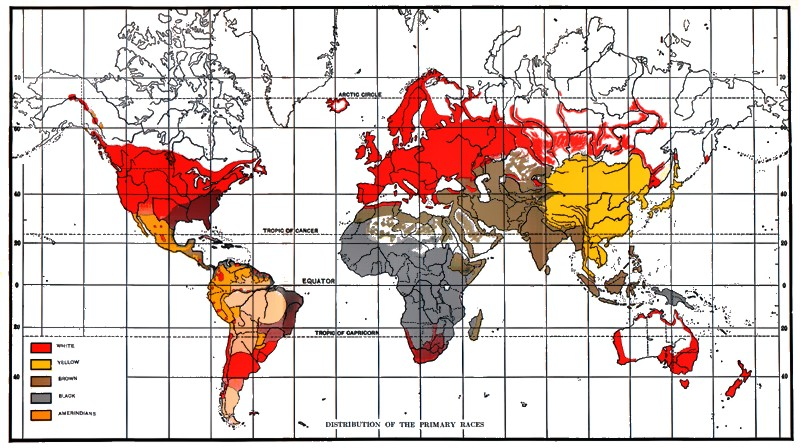
Lothrop Stoddard's analyses of the world's "primary races" White, Yellow, Brown, Black, and Amerindian, and their interactions

The Rising Tide of Color: The Threat Against White World-Supremacy is a 1920 nonfiction book by American author Lothrop Stoddard about racialism and geopolitics, which foresees the collapse of white supremacy and colonialism due to population growth among people of color, rising nationalism in colonized nations, and industrialization in China and Japan. To counter the perceived geopolitical threat, Stoddard advocated Nordicism, racial segregation, and general racism, restricting non-white immigration into white-majority countries, which would dilute the national concentrations of the "Nordic race"; restricting Asian migration to Africa; and slowly giving independence to European colonies in Asia (including the Middle East). A noted eugenicist, Stoddard supported a separation of the "primary races" of the world, warning against miscegenation and the acceptance of interracial marriage and multiracial children.

== Synopsis ==
Stoddard claims that there is a perceived threat of non-white "races" to the global dominance of the white race, "typified by the Russo-Japanese War," which he represents as a struggle of color against white.

In addition to Japan, he describes a "brown reaction", which he calls "the Mohammedan Revival", taking as exemplary Yahya Siddyk's work "The Awakening of the Islamic Peoples in the Fourteenth Century of the Hegira". He also describes an African movement which he calls the "Ethiopian Church", spread by "Afro-American Methodist preachers", and which "had a hand in the Zulu rising which broke out in Natal in 1907".

The book also warns of the dangers of race-mixing and the need for white countries to maintain their racial "purity". The thesis is that due to immigration, white people produce fewer children so as to give them the capital to live in white communities:

"As long as the people of any community are relatively homogeneous, what differences of wealth and social position there may be do not affect the birth-rate, or do so only after a considerable time. But put into that community a number of immigrants, inferior mentally, socially, and economically, and the natives are unwilling to have their children associate with them in work or social life. They then limit the number of their children in order to give them the capital or education to enter occupations in which they will not be brought into contact with the new arrivals."

Stoddard argues that the increasing population and economic power of non-white races, particularly in Asia, will lead to a "collapse of civilization", typified by the situation in Latin America, which he describes as "the mongrel's political ascendancy", saying further that "[t]hese unhappy beings, every cell of whose bodies is a battle-ground of jarring heredities, express their souls in acts of hectic violence and aimless instability. The normal state of tropical America is anarchy, restrained only by domestic tyrants or foreign masters". Stoddard's thesis is that the white race has dominated world affairs for centuries and has created a civilization that is superior to all others.

== Publication and reception ==
In 1920, The Rising Tide of Color Against White World-Supremacy was positively reviewed and recommended by The New York Times: "Lothrop Stoddard evokes a new peril, that of an eventual submersion beneath vast waves of yellow men, brown men, black men and red men, whom the Nordics have hitherto dominated . . . with Bolshevism menacing us on the one hand and race extinction through warfare on the other, many people are not unlikely to give [Stoddard's book] respectful consideration".

Civil rights activist W. E. B. Du Bois stated "the Nordic peoples...have been responsible for more intermixture of races than any other people, ancient and modern," and in reply to whites' fears of miscegenation declared "Who in Hell asked to marry your daughters?"

In reply to Stoddard's notion that "if the Negroes have separate schools, they shall be good schools; that if they have separate train accommodations, they shall have good accommodations", black audiences allegedly laughed in disbelief.

In 1921, in a speech to a mixed-race audience in Birmingham, Alabama, U.S. President Warren Harding said that Black Americans must have full economic and political rights, but that segregation was also essential to prevent "racial amalgamation" and that social equality was thus a dream that Blacks must give up, and used the book to support his segregationist views: "Whoever will take the time to read and ponder Mr. Lothrop Stoddard’s book on The Rising Tide of Color . . . must realize that our race problem here in the United States is only a phase of a race issue that the whole world confronts."

The anthropologist Franz Boas criticised the scientific racism presented and advocated in The Rising Tide of Color, and U.S. black newspapers called Stoddard "the high priest of racial baloney". In the 21st century, the racialism presented by Stoddard remains an ideological influence upon the philosophy and the politics of the white supremacist movement in the United States.

In F. Scott Fitzgerald's 1925 novel The Great Gatsby, the antagonist Tom Buchanan refers to the book, lightly disguising the author as "Goddard", who writes about how the white race will be "utterly submerged".

== See also ==
- The Hour of Decision
- Man and Technics
- Race of the future
- Great Replacement conspiracy theory, a similar white supremacist canard developed around 90 years later
- Human overpopulation#Racism
