= Oswald Spengler =

German polymath (1880–1936)

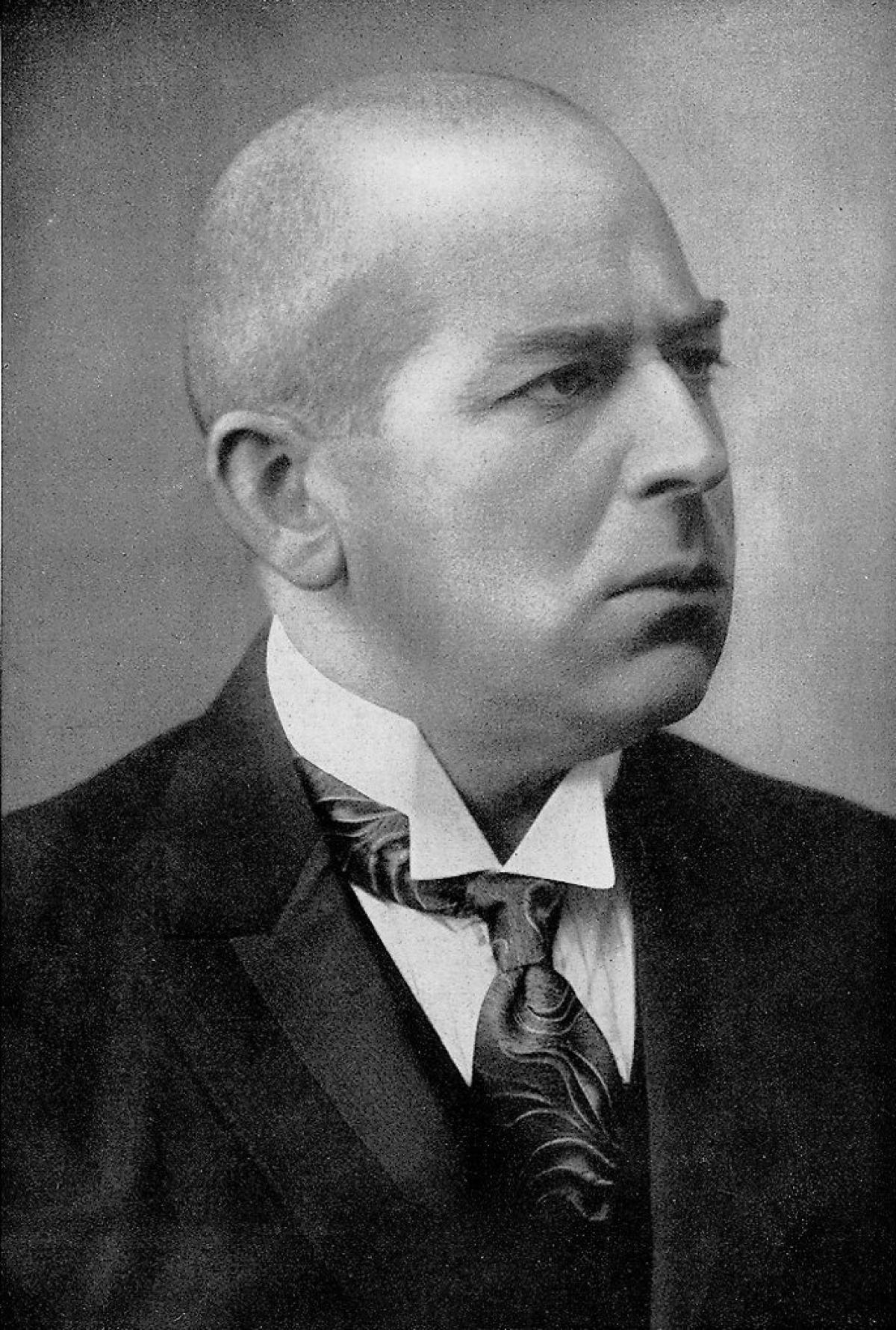
- Spengler in 1929
- Born: Oswald Arnold Gottfried Spengler; 29 May 1880; Blankenburg, Duchy of Brunswick, German Empire
- Died: 8 May 1936 (aged 55); Munich, Bavaria, Nazi Germany

Education
- Education: Ludwig-Maximilians-Universität München; Friedrich Wilhelm University of Berlin; University of Halle
- Thesis: Der metaphysische Grundgedanke der heraklitischen Philosophie (1904)
- Doctoral advisor: Alois Riehl
- Other advisor: Lujo Brentano; Hans Vaihinger

Philosophical work
- Era: 20th-century philosophy
- Region: Western philosophy
- School: Continental philosophy; Goethean science; Conservative Revolution; Lebensphilosophie; Irrationalism
- Main interests: Aesthetics; Philosophy of culture; Philosophy of history; Philosophy of science; Political philosophy
- Notable works: The Decline of the West (1918, 1922); Prussianism and Socialism (1919); Man and Technics (1932); The Hour of Decision (1933)

Signature
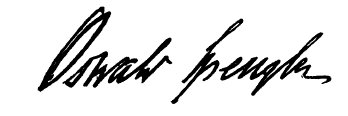

Oswald Arnold Gottfried Spengler (Note: /ˈspɛŋɡlər/; German: [ˈɔsvalt ˈʃpɛŋlɐ]) (29 May 1880 – 8 May 1936) was a German polymath whose areas of interest included history, philosophy, mathematics, science, and art, as well as their relation to his organic theory of history. He is best known for his two-volume work The Decline of the West (Der Untergang des Abendlandes), published in 1918 and 1922, covering human history. Spengler's model of history postulates that human cultures and civilizations are akin to biological entities, each with a limited, predictable, and deterministic lifespan. He predicted that Western civilization would enter the period of pre‑death emergency around the year 2000, which would lead to 200 years of Caesarism (extra-constitutional omnipotence of the executive branch of government) before Western civilization's final collapse.

Spengler is regarded as a German nationalist and a critic of republicanism. He was a prominent member of the Weimar-era Conservative Revolution. While the Nazis had viewed his writings as a means to provide a "respectable pedigree" to their ideology, Spengler criticized Nazism for its racialist and antisemitic elements, and he came to be considered a persona non grata by the Nazi regime. He saw Benito Mussolini and entrepreneurial types, such as the mining magnate Cecil Rhodes, as examples of the impending Caesars of Western culture—later expressing disappointment in Mussolini's colonialist adventurism.

== Biography ==
=== Early life and family ===
Oswald Arnold Gottfried Spengler was born on 29 May 1880 in Blankenburg, Duchy of Brunswick, German Empire, the oldest surviving child of Bernhard Spengler (1844–1901) and Pauline Spengler (1840–1910), née Grantzow, the descendant of an artistic family. His elder brother was born prematurely in 1879, when his mother tried to move a heavy laundry basket, and died at the age of three weeks. Spengler was born ten months after his brother's death. His younger sisters were Adele (1881–1917), Gertrud (1882–1957), and Hildegard (1885–1942). His paternal grandfather, Theodor Spengler (1806–1876), was a metallurgical inspector (Hütteninspektor) in Altenbrak.

Spengler's maternal great-grandfather, Friedrich Wilhelm Grantzow, a tailor's apprentice in Berlin, had three children out of wedlock with a Jewish woman named Bräunchen Moses (c. 1769–1849) whom he later married, on 26 May 1799. Shortly before the wedding, Moses was baptized as Johanna Elisabeth Anspachin; the surname was chosen after her birthplace—Anspach. Her parents, Abraham and Reile Moses, were both deceased by then. The couple had another five children, one of whom was Spengler's maternal grandfather, Gustav Adolf Grantzow (1811–1883)—a solo dancer and ballet master in Berlin, who in 1837 married Katharina Kirchner (1813–1873), a solo dancer from a Munich Catholic family; the second of their four daughters was Spengler's mother. Like the Grantzows in general, Spengler's mother was of a Bohemian disposition; before marrying Spengler's father, she accompanied her dancer sisters on tours. In appearance, she was plump. Her temperament, which Spengler inherited, was moody, irritable, and morose.

=== Education ===
When Spengler was ten years of age, his family moved to the university city of Halle. He received a classical education at the local Gymnasium (academically oriented secondary school), studying Greek, Latin, mathematics, and sciences. He developed his propensity for the arts—especially poetry, drama, and music—and came under the influence of the ideas of Johann Wolfgang von Goethe and Friedrich Nietzsche. At 17, he wrote a drama titled Montezuma.

After his father's death in 1901, Spengler attended the Ludwig-Maximilians-Universität München, the Friedrich Wilhelm University of Berlin, and the University of Halle as a private scholar, taking courses in a wide range of subjects. His studies were undirected. In 1903, he failed his doctoral thesis on Heraclitus—titled Der metaphysische Grundgedanke der heraklitischen Philosophie (The Fundamental Metaphysical Thought of the Heraclitean Philosophy) and conducted under the direction of Alois Riehl—because of insufficient references. He took the doctoral oral exam again and received his PhD from Halle on 6 April 1904. In December 1904, he began to write the secondary dissertation (Staatsexamensarbeit) necessary to qualify as a high school teacher. This became The Development of the Organ of Sight in the Higher Realms of the Animal Kingdom (Die Entwicklung des Sehorgans bei den Hauptstufen des Tierreiches), a text now lost. It was approved and he received his teaching certificate. In 1905, Spengler suffered a nervous breakdown.

=== Career ===
Spengler briefly served as a teacher in Saarbrücken then in Düsseldorf. From 1908 to 1911, he worked at a grammar school (Realgymnasium) in Hamburg, where he taught science, German history, and mathematics. Biographers report that his life as a teacher was uneventful.

In 1911, following his mother's death, Spengler moved to Munich, where he lived for the rest of his life. While there, he was a cloistered scholar, supported by his modest inheritance. Spengler survived on very limited means and was marked by loneliness. He owned no books, and took work as a tutor and wrote for magazines to earn additional income. Due to a severe heart problem, Spengler was exempted from military service. During the war, his inheritance was useless because it was invested overseas; thus, he lived in genuine poverty for this period.

Spengler began work on the first volume of The Decline of the West intending to focus on Germany within Europe; however, the Agadir Crisis of 1911 affected him deeply, so he widened the scope of his study. According to Spengler the book was completed in 1914, but the first edition was published in the summer of 1918, shortly before the end of World War I. Spengler wrote about the years immediately prior to World War I in Decline:

At that time the World-War appeared to me both as imminent and also as the inevitable outward manifestation of the historical crisis, and my endeavor was to comprehend it from an examination of the spirit of the preceding centuries—not years. ... Thereafter I saw the present—the approaching World-War—in a quite other light. It was no longer a momentary constellation of casual facts due to national sentiments, personal influences, or economic tendencies endowed with an appearance of unity and necessity by some historian's scheme of political or social cause-and-effect, but the type of historical change of phase occurring within a great historical organism of definable compass at the point preordained for it hundreds of years ago.

When the first volume of The Decline of the West was published, it was a wild success. (Note: The original Preface is dated December 1917 and ends with Spengler expressing hope that "his book would not be unworthy of German military achievements".) Spengler became an instant celebrity. The national humiliation of the Treaty of Versailles (1919), followed by economic depression in 1923 and hyperinflation, seemed to prove Spengler right. Decline comforted Germans because it could be used as a rationale for their diminished pre-eminence, i.e. due to larger world-historical processes. The book met with wide success outside of Germany as well, and by 1919 had been translated into several other languages.

The second volume of Decline was published in 1922. In it, Spengler argued that German socialism differed from Marxism; instead, he said it was more compatible with traditional German conservatism. Spengler declined an appointment as Professor of Philosophy at the University of Göttingen, saying he needed time to focus on writing.

The book was widely discussed, even by those who had not read it. Historians took umbrage at his unapologetically non-scientific approach. Novelist Thomas Mann compared reading Spengler's book to reading Arthur Schopenhauer's works for the first time. Academics gave it a mixed reception. Sociologist Max Weber described Spengler as a "very ingenious and learned dilettante", while philosopher Karl Popper called the thesis "pointless". The first volume of Decline was published in English by Alfred A. Knopf in 1926, the second in 1928.

=== Aftermath ===
In 1924, following the social-economic upheaval and hyperinflation, Spengler entered politics in an effort to bring Reichswehr General Hans von Seeckt to power as the country's leader. The attempt failed and Spengler proved ineffective in practical politics. A 1928 Time review of the second volume of Decline described the immense influence and controversy Spengler's ideas enjoyed during the 1920s: "When the first volume of The Decline of the West appeared in Germany a few years ago, thousands of copies were sold. Cultivated European discourse quickly became Spengler-saturated. Spenglerism spurted from the pens of countless disciples. It was imperative to read Spengler, to sympathize or revolt. It still remains so".

In 1931, Spengler published Man and Technics, which warned against the dangers of technology and industrialism to culture. He especially pointed to the tendency of Western technology to spread to hostile "Colored races" which would then use the weapons against the West. It was poorly received because of its anti-industrialism. This book contains the well-known Spengler quote "Optimism is cowardice".

Despite voting for Adolf Hitler over Paul von Hindenburg in 1932, Spengler found the Führer vulgar. He met Hitler in 1933 and after a lengthy discussion remained unimpressed, saying that Germany did not need "a heroic tenor but a real hero". He quarreled publicly with Alfred Rosenberg, and his pessimism and remarks about the Führer resulted in isolation and public silence. He further rejected offers from Joseph Goebbels to give public speeches; however, Spengler became a member of the German Academy that year.

The Hour of Decision, published in 1933, was a bestseller, but was later banned for its critique of Nazism. While the Nazis welcomed Spengler's criticisms of liberalism, he disagreed with their biological ideology and antisemitism. Although racial mysticism played a key role in his own worldview, Spengler had always been an outspoken critic of the racial theories professed by the Nazis and many others in his time, and was not inclined to change his views during and after Hitler's rise to power. Spengler was a German nationalist who viewed the Nazis as too narrowly German and not Western enough to lead the fight against other peoples. The book also warned of a coming world war in which Western civilization risked being destroyed, and was widely distributed abroad before eventually being banned by the Nazi Party. A Time review of The Hour of Decision noted Spengler's international popularity as a polemicist, observing, "When Oswald Spengler speaks, many a Western Worldling stops to listen", and recommended the book for "readers who enjoy vigorous writing", who "will be glad to be rubbed the wrong way by Spengler's harsh aphorisms" and his pessimistic predictions.

=== Later life and death ===
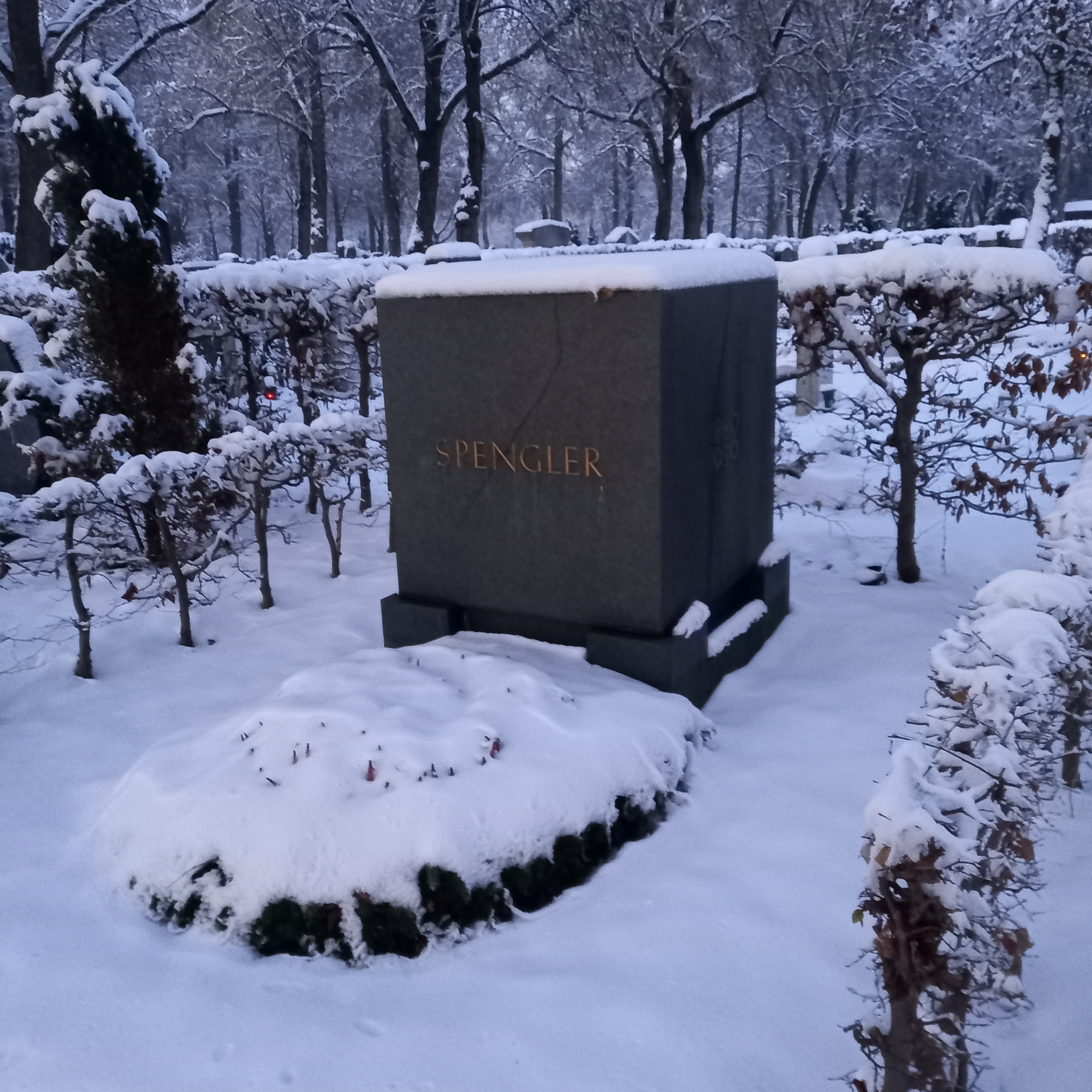
Spengler's grave

On 13 October 1933, Spengler became one of the hundred senators of the German Academy. Spengler spent his final years in Munich, listening to Ludwig van Beethoven, reading Molière and William Shakespeare, buying several thousand books, and collecting ancient Turkish, Persian (Median and Achaemenid Empires), and Indian weapons. He made occasional trips to the Harz mountains and to Italy.

Spengler died of a heart attack on 8 May 1936, in Munich, at age 55. He was buried in the Nordfriedhof in Munich.

== Views ==
=== Influences ===
In the introduction to The Decline of the West, Spengler cites Goethe and Nietzsche as his major influences. Goethe's vitalism and Nietzsche's cultural criticism in particular are highlighted in his works.

I feel urged to name once more those to whom I owe practically everything: Goethe and Nietzsche. Goethe gave me method, Nietzsche the questioning faculty — and if I were asked to find a formula for my relation to the latter I should say that I had made of his "outlook" (Ausblick) an "overlook" (Überblick).

Spengler was also influenced by the universal and cyclical vision of world history proposed by the German historian Eduard Meyer. The belief in the progression of civilizations through an evolutionary process comparable with living beings can be traced back to classical antiquity, although it is difficult to assess the extent of the influence those thinkers had on Spengler: Cato the Elder, Cicero, Seneca the Younger, Florus, Ammianus Marcellinus, and later Francis Bacon, who compared different empires with each other with the help of biological analogies.

=== The Decline of the West (1918) ===
The concept of historical philosophy developed by Spengler is founded upon two assumptions:

- the existence of social entities called 'Cultures' (Kulturen) and regarded as the largest possible actors in human history.
- the parallelism between the evolution of those Cultures and the evolution of living beings.

Spengler enumerates nine high Cultures: Ancient Egyptian, Babylonian, Indian, Chinese, Greco-Roman or "Apollonian", "Magian" (including Zoroastrianism, Judaism, and early Byzantine Christianity and Islam), Mexican, Western or "Faustian", and Russian. They interacted with each other in time and space but were distinctive due to 'internal' attributes. According to Spengler, "Cultures are organisms, and world-history is their collective biography."

'Mankind' ... has no aim, no idea, no plan, any more than the family of butterflies or orchids. 'Mankind' is a zoological expression, or an empty word. … I see, in place of that empty figment of one linear history which can only be kept up by shutting one's eyes to the overwhelming multitude of the facts, the drama of a number of mighty Cultures, each springing with primitive strength from the soil of a mother region to which it remains firmly bound throughout its whole life-cycle; each stamping its material, its mankind, in its own image; each having its own idea, its own passions, its own life, will and feeling, its own death.

Spengler compares the evolution of cultures to the different ages of human life by stating, "Every Culture passes through the age-phases of the individual man. Each has its childhood, youth, manhood and old age", and argues that when a Culture enters its late stage, it becomes a civilization (Zivilisation), a petrified body characterized in the modern age by technology, imperialism, and mass society, which he expected to fossilize and decline from the 2000s onward. The first-millennium Near East was in his view not a transition between Classical Antiquity, Western Christianity, and Islam, but rather an emerging new Culture he named "Magian (Zoroastrian priest)", explaining messianic Judaism, early Christianity, Gnosticism, Mandaeism, Zoroastrianism, and Islam as different expressions of a single Culture sharing a unique worldview. Spengler termed his method of describing the evolution of High Cultures "destiny-thinking," which he contrasted with "causality-thinking", saying in The Decline of the West that "the Civilization is the inevitable destiny of the Culture".

The great historian of antiquity Eduard Meyer thought highly of Spengler, although he also had some criticisms of him. Spengler's obscurity, intuitiveness, and mysticism were easy targets, especially for the positivists and neo-Kantians who rejected the possibility that there was meaning in world history. The critic and aesthete Count Harry Kessler thought him unoriginal and rather inane, especially in regard to his opinion on Nietzsche. Philosopher Ludwig Wittgenstein, shared Spengler's cultural pessimism. Spengler's work became an important foundation for social cycle theory.

=== Prussianism and Socialism (1919) ===
Prussianism and Socialism (German: Preußentum und Sozialismus [ˈpʁɔʏsn̩tuːm ʔʊnt zotsi̯aˈlɪsmʊs]) is a 1919 book by Oswald Spengler originally based on notes intended for the second volume of The Decline of the West, in which he argues for "Prussian" socialism, characterized by an emphasis on social roles rather than capital, in contrast to mainstream socialism, which he refers to as "English" socialism.

Spengler responded to the claim that socialism's rise in Germany had not begun with the German revolution of 1918–1919 but rather in 1914 when Germany waged war, uniting the German nation in a national struggle that he claimed was based on socialistic Prussian characteristics, including creativity, discipline, concern for the greater good, productivity, and self-sacrifice.

In the book, Spengler claimed that these socialistic Prussian qualities were present across Germany and stated that the merger of German nationalism with this form of socialism, while resisting Marxist and internationalist socialism, would be in the interests of Germany. Spengler's Prussian socialism was popular amongst some Germans, especially some conservative revolutionaries who had distanced themselves from traditional conservatism. His notions of Prussian socialism influenced Nazism and the Conservative Revolutionary movement.

Spengler described socialism outside of a class conflict perspective and said, "The meaning of socialism is that life is controlled not by the opposition between rich and poor, but by the rank that achievement and talent bestow. That is our freedom, freedom from the economic despotism of the individual." Spengler addressed the need of Germans to accept Prussian socialism to free themselves from foreign forms of government, stating:

Prussiandom and socialism stand together against the inner England, against the world-view that infuses our entire life as a people, crippling it and stealing its soul ... The working class must liberate itself from the illusions of Marxism. Marx is dead. As a form of existence, socialism is just beginning, but the socialism of the German proletariat is at an end. For the worker, there is only Prussian socialism or nothing... For conservatives, there is only conscious socialism or destruction. But we need liberation from the forms of Anglo-French democracy. We have our own.

Spengler went further to demonstrate the difference between priorities held in England and Prussia, stating that "English society is founded on the distinction between rich and poor, Prussian society on the distinction between command and obedience ... Democracy in England means the possibility for everyone to become rich, in Prussia the possibility of attaining to every existing rank." Spengler claimed that Frederick William I of Prussia became the "first conscious socialist" for having founded Prussian tradition of military and bureaucratic discipline. He also claimed that Otto von Bismarck's social policies were socialist in nature, and that they complemented his conservative policies rather than contradicted them as claimed by others.

Spengler denounced Marxism for having developed socialism from an English perspective, while not understanding Germans' socialist nature. In the pamphlet, a central argument is that the corrupt forces promoting English socialism in his country comprised an "invisible English army, which Napoleon had left behind on German soil after the Battle of Jena". Spengler accused Marxism of following the British tradition in which the poor envy the rich, stating: "The socialism of a Fichte would accuse [those who don't work] of sloth, it would brand them as irresponsible, dispensable shirkers and parasites. But Marxian instinct envies them. They are too well-off, and therefore they should be revolted against. Marx has inoculated his proletariat with a contempt for work."

Spengler claimed that Marxism sought to train the proletariat to "expropriate the expropriator", the capitalist, so that the proletariat could live a life of leisure on this expropriation. In summary, Spengler concluded that "Marxism is the capitalism of the working class" and not "true socialism". In contrast to Marxism, Spengler claimed that "true socialism" in its German form "does not mean nationalization through expropriation or robbery". Spengler justified this claim by saying:

In general, it is a question not of nominal possession but of the technique of administration. For a slogan’s sake to buy up enterprises immoderately and purposelessly and to turn them over to public administration in the place of the initiative and responsibility of their owners, who must eventually lose all power of supervision—that means the destruction of socialism. The old Prussian idea was to bring under legislative control the formal structure of the whole national productive force, at the same time carefully preserving the right of property and inheritance, and leaving scope for the kind of personal enterprise, talent, energy, and intellect displayed by an experienced chess player, playing within the rules of the game and enjoying that sort of freedom which the very sway of the rule affords ... Socialization means the slow transformation—taking centuries to complete—of the worker into an economic functionary, and the employer into a responsible supervisory official.

"True socialism" according to Spengler would take the form of a corporatism in which "local corporate bodies organized according to the importance of each occupation to the people as a whole; higher representation in stages up to a supreme council of the state; mandates revocable at any time; no organized parties, no professional politicians, no periodic elections." He also posited that the West will spend the next and last several hundred years of its existence in a state of Caesarian socialism, when all humans will be synergized into a harmonious and happy totality by a dictator, like an orchestra is synergized into a harmonious totality by its conductor.

==== Nazism and fascism ====
Spengler was an important influence on Nazi ideology. He "provided skeletal Nazi ideas" to the early Nazi movement and "gave them a respectable pedigree". Key parts of his writings were incorporated into Nazi Party ideology. Spengler's criticism of the Nazi Party was taken seriously by Hitler, and Virginia Quarterly Review credited him for inspiring Hitler to carry out the Night of the Long Knives in which Ernst Röhm and other leaders of the Sturmabteilung (SA) were executed. In 1934, Spengler pronounced the funeral oration for one of the victims of the Night of the Long Knives and retired in 1935 from the board of the highly influential Nietzsche Archive which was viewed as opposition to the regime.

Spengler considered Judaism to be a "disintegrating element" (zersetzendes Element) that acts destructively "wherever it intervenes" (wo es auch eingreift). In his view, Jews are characterized by a "cynical intelligence" (zynische Intelligenz), and by "money thinking" (Gelddenken). As a result, he claimed they were incapable of adapting to Western culture and represented a foreign body in Europe. He also explained in The Decline of the West that this is a pattern shared in all civilizations and how the ancient Jew would have seen the cynical atheistic Romans of the late Roman Empire the same way Westerners today see Jews. Alexander Bein argues that with these characterizations Spengler contributed significantly to the enforcement of Jewish stereotypes in pre-World War II German circles.

Spengler viewed Nazi antisemitism as self-defeating, and personally took an ethnological view of race and culture. In his private papers, he remarked upon "how much envy of the capability of other people in view of one's lack of it lies hidden in anti-Semitism!", and arguing that "when one would rather destroy business and scholarship than see Jews in them, one is an ideologue, i.e., a danger for the nation. Idiotic." Spengler regarded the transformation of ultra-capitalist mass democracies into dictatorial regimes as inevitable, and he had expressed acknowledgement for Benito Mussolini and the Italian fascist movement as a first symptom of this development.

== Legacy ==
Spengler influenced other academics, including historians Arnold J. Toynbee, Carroll Quigley, and Samuel P. Huntington. Others include fascist ideologues Francis Parker Yockey and Oswald Mosley. John Calvert observed that Spengler's criticism of Western civilization remains popular among Islamists.

== Works ==
- Der metaphysische Grundgedanke der heraklitischen Philosophie [The Fundamental Metaphysical Idea of the Philosophy of Heraclitus] (in German), 1904
- Der Untergang des Abendlandes: Umrisse einer Morphologie der Weltgeschichte [The Decline of the West: Outlines of a Morphology of world history], Gestalt und Wirklichkeit; Welthistorische Perspektiven (in German), 1918–22, 2 vols. – The Decline of the West; an Abridged Edition by Helmut Werner (tr. by C.F. Atkinson).
  - "On the Style-Patterns of Culture." In Talcott Parsons, ed., Theories of Society, Vol. II, The Free Press of Glencoe, 1961.
- Preussentum und Sozialismus, 1920, Translated 1922 as Prussianism And Socialism by C.F. Atkinson (Prussianism and Socialism).
- Pessimismus?, G. Stilke, 1921.
- Neubau des deutschen Reiches, 1924.
- Die Revolution ist nicht zu Ende, 1924.
- Politische Pflichten der deutschen Jugend; Rede gehalten am 26. Februar 1924 vor dem Hochschulring deutscher Art in Würzburg, 1925.
- Der Mensch und die Technik, 1931 (Man and Technics: A Contribution to a Philosophy of Life, tr. C.F. Atkinson, Knopf, 1932).
- Politische Schriften, 1932.
- Jahre der Entscheidung, 1933 (The Hour of Decision tr. C.F. Atkinson)(The Hour of Decision).
- Reden und Aufsätze, 1937 (ed. by Hildegard Kornhardt) – Selected Essays (tr. Donald O. White).
- Gedanken, c. 1941 (ed. by Hildegard Kornhardt) – Aphorisms (translated by Gisela Koch-Weser O'Brien).
- Briefe, 1913–1936, 1963 [The Letters of Oswald Spengler, 1913–1936] (ed. and tr. by A. Helps).
- Urfragen; Fragmente aus dem Nachlass, 1965 (ed. by Anton Mirko Koktanek and Manfred Schröter).
- Frühzeit der Weltgeschichte: Fragmente aus dem Nachlass, 1966 (ed. by A. M. Koktanek and Manfred Schröter).
- Der Briefwechsel zwischen Oswald Spengler und Wolfgang E. Groeger. Über russische Literatur, Zeitgeschichte und soziale Fragen, 1987 (ed. by Xenia Werner).
