= Brown (racial classification) =

Racial classification

Brown is a racialized classification of people, usually a political and skin color-based category for specific populations with a light to moderate brown complexion.

== In the age of scientific racism ==
In the 18th and 19th century, European writers proposed geographically based "scientific" differences among "the races". Many of these racial models assigned colors to the groups described, and some included a "brown race" as in the following:

- In the late 18th century, German anthropologist Johann Blumenbach extended Linnaeus's four-color race model by adding the brown race, "Malay race", which included both the Malay division of Austronesian (Southern-Thailand, Cambodia, Indonesia, Philippines, Malaysia, Brunei, Pattani, Sumatra, Madagascar, Formosans, etc.), along with Polynesians and Melanesians of Pacific Islands (including Papuans), as well as Indigenous Australians.
- In 1775, "John Hunter of Edinburgh included under the label light brown, Southern Europeans, Italians, the Spanish, Persians, Turks and Laplanders, under the label brown."
- Jean Baptiste Julien d'Omalius d'Halloy's five-race scheme differed from Blumenbach's by including Ethiopians in the brown race, as well as Oceanic peoples. Louis Figuier adopted and adapted d'Omalius d'Halloy's classification and also included Egyptians in the brown race.
- In 1915, Donald Mackenzie conceived a "Mediterranean or Brown race, the eastern branch of which reaches to India and the western to the British Isles... [and includes] predynastic Egyptians... [and some populations of] Neolithic man".

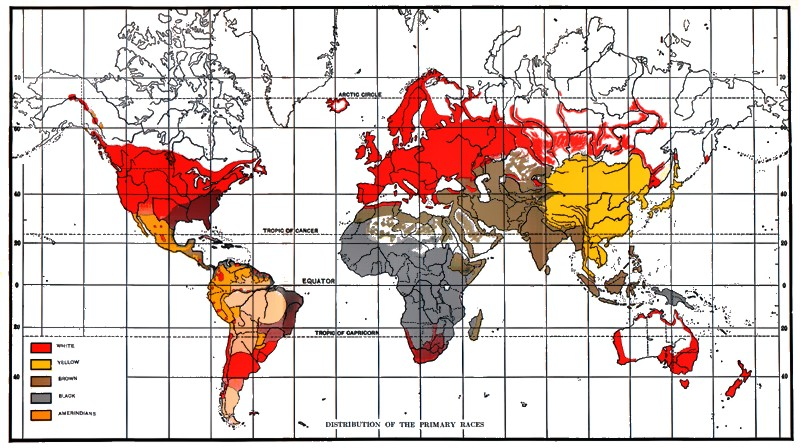
Global racial map by eugenicist Lothrop Stoddard in The Rising Tide of Color Against White World-Supremacy, 1920

- Eugenicist Lothrop Stoddard in his The Rising Tide of Color Against White World-Supremacy (1920) mapped a "brown race" as native to North Africa, the Horn of Africa, the Caucasus (partially), the Near East, Middle East, Central Asia, South Asia, Southeast Asia, and Austronesia (Malay race). Stoddard's "brown" is one of five "primary races", contrasting with "white", "black", "yellow" and "Amerindian" (or "red").
- Due to what he considered the relatively close physical relationship between many populations "from the Red Sea as far as India, including Semites as well as Hamites", Grafton Elliot Smith conceived the Brown Race as a natural extension of Giuseppe Sergi's earlier Mediterranean race concept. In this popular conception, the Brown Race consisted of a joint "Mediterranean-Hamite-Semite" grouping of ancestrally related peoples, into which Elliot Smith included the Proto-Egyptians.

These and other race theories have been dismissed scientifically. As a 2012-human biology textbook observes, "These claims of race-based taxonomy, including [Carleton] Coon's claims for homo-sapienation, have been discredited by paleontological and genomic research showing the antiquity of modern human origins, as well as the essential genomic African nature of all living human beings."

=== Subdivisions ===
In the 19th century, the notion of a single "brown people" was sometimes superseded by multiple "brown peoples". Cust mentions Grammar in 1852 denying that there was one single "brown race", but in fact, several races speaking distinct languages. The 1858 Cyclopaedia of India and of eastern and southern Asia notes that Keane was dividing the "brown people" into quaternion: a western branch that he termed the Malay, a north-western group that he termed the Micronesian, and the peoples of the eastern archipelagos that he termed the Maori and the Polynesian.

== Ethnic and racial identifier ==
The appellation "brown people" has been applied in the 20th and 21st centuries to several groups. Both Edward Telles, a sociologist of race and ethnicity, and Jack Forbes argue that this classification is biologically invalid. However, as Telles notes, it is still of sociological significance. Irrespective of the actual biological differences amongst humans, and of the actual complexities of human skin coloration, people nonetheless self-identify as "brown" and identify other groups of people as "brown", using characteristics that include skin color, hair strength, language, and culture, in order to classify them.

Forbes remarks upon a process of "lumping", whereby characteristics other than skin color, such as hair color or curliness, act as "triggers" for color categories "even when it may not be appropriate."

=== Ethnicity in South Africa ===
In 1950s (and later) South Africa, the "brown people" were the Coloureds, referring to those born of multiracial sexual unions out of wedlock. They were distinct from the Reheboth Basters inhabiting Namibia, who were primarily of Khoisan and European parentage. The Afrikaans terms, which incorporate many subtleties of heritage, political agenda, and identity, are "bruin" ("brown"), "bruines" ("browns"), and "bruinmense" ("brown people"). Some South Africans prefer the appellation "bruinmense" to "Coloured".

The South African pencil test was one example of a characteristic other than skin color being used as a determiner. The pencil test, which distinguished either "black" from "Coloured" or "Coloured" from "white", relied upon curliness and strength of hair (i.e. whether it was capable of retaining a pencil under its own strength) rather than upon any color factor at all. The pencil test could "trump skin color".

Steve Biko, in his trial in 1976, rejected the appellation "brown people" when it was put to him incorrectly by Judge Boshoff:

Boshoff: But now why do you refer to you people as blacks? Why not brown people? I mean you people are more brown than black.
Biko: In the same way as I think white people are more pink and yellow and pale than white.
Boshoff: Quite ... but now why do you not use the word brown then?
Biko: No, I think really, historically, we have been defined as black people, and when we reject the term non-white and take upon ourselves the right to call ourselves what we think we are, we have got available in front of us a whole number of alternatives ... and we choose this one precisely because we feel it is most accommodating.

Penelope Oakes characterizes Biko's argument as picking "black" over "brown" because for Biko it is "the most valid, meaningful and appropriate representation, even though in an individualistic decontextualized sense it might appear wrong" (Oakes's emphasis).

This contrasts with Piet Uithalder, the fictional protagonist of the satirical column "Straatpraatjes" (whose actual author was never revealed but who is believed to have been Abdullah Abdurahman) that appeared in the Dutch-Afrikaans section of the newspaper APO between May 1909 and February 1922. Uithalder would self-identify as a Coloured person, with the column targeted at a Coloured readership, introducing himself as "een van de ras" ("a member of the race") and characterizing himself as a "bruine mens".

=== Pardos in Brazil ===
In popular use, Brazilians also use a category of moreno m. [moˈɾenu], morena f. [moˈɾenɐ], lit. 'swarthy', from mouro, Portuguese for 'Moor', which were perceived as those with darker phenotypes than European peoples. Thus a moreno or morena is a person with a "Moorish" phenotype, which is extremely ambiguous as it can mean "dark-haired people", but is also used as a euphemism for pardo, and even "black". In a 1995 survey, 32% of the population self-identified as moreno, with a further 6% self-identifying as moreno claro ("light moreno"). 7% self-identified as "pardo".

A comprehensive study presented by the Brazilian Journal of Medical and Biological Research found that on average, white Brazilians have >70-90% European genomic ancestry, whereas black Brazilians have 60% European genomic ancestry. It concluded that "The high ancestral variability observed in Whites and Blacks suggests that each Brazilian has a singular and quite individual proportion of European, African and Amerindian ancestry in their mosaic genomes. Thus, the only possible basis to deal with genetic variation in Brazilians is not by considering them as members of color groups, but on a person-by-person basis, as 190 million human beings, with singular genome and life histories".

=== Use in Canada ===
Relating to brown identity, the popular usage of the term in Canada generally refers to individuals of South Asian ancestry.

=== Use in Britain ===
"Brown" has become an increasingly common identity for individuals of South Asian and Horn African heritage, mainly due to American and Canadian influence.

=== Use in the United States ===
"Brown" has been used as a term in popular culture for Americans of South Asian, Middle Eastern, North African, Southeast Asian, Native American, and/or Latino origin, either as a pejorative term or sometimes for self-identification, as with brown identity. Judith Ortiz Cofer noted that appellation varies according to geographical location, observing that in Puerto Rico she was considered to be a "white person", but in the United States mainland, she was considered to be a "brown person". Moustafa Bayoumi, an Egyptian-American professor of English at Brooklyn College, identified himself as a "brown Arab-American" in an opinion piece criticizing the United States Census for forcing self-identified brown persons to identify as white.

The term "Brown American" has been used both as a pejorative and as a self-identifier in reference to Austronesian Filipino Americans. Furthermore, some Americans of Southeast Asian or South Asian descent have used the terms "Brown Asian" or "Brown South Asian" to distinguish themselves from East Asian Americans, who are what the term "Asian American" usually refers to in the United States.

==== Brown pride ====
Brown pride is a movement primarily in the United States among mestizo Latin people to develop a positive self-image by embracing the idea of being brown as a form of pride. Brown pride is a response to the racist or colorist narrative that white skin is more beautiful than brown skin. Brown pride first emerged among Mexican Americans in the United States alongside the Chicano and Black is Beautiful movement in the 1960s.

==== Media portrayals of "brown" people ====
In the United States, mainstream media has sometimes referenced brown as a racial classification that is a threat to White Americans and the idea of 'United States of America' in general. This has been done through rhetoric of a "brown tide" that is changing the demographic landscape of the United States, often with an underlying negative tone. This may stoke racial fears of people, and particularly Latinos, who are seen as brown.

== See also ==
- Bronze (racial classification)
- Racism
- Discrimination based on skin color
- Melting pot
- Political blackness
