= John Lawson Stoddard =

American lecturer and writer (1850–1931)

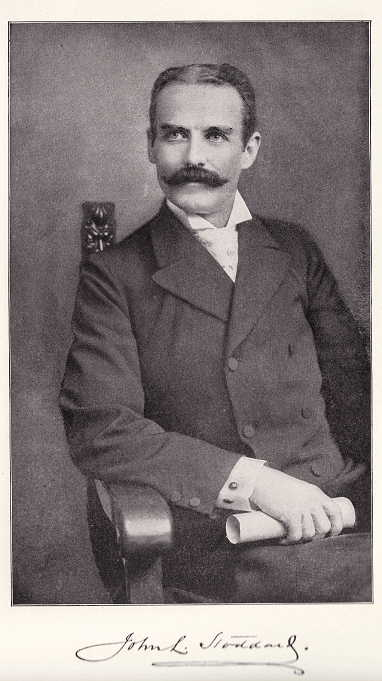
- Born: April 24, 1850; Brookline, Massachusetts, US
- Died: June 5, 1931 (aged 81); South Tyrol, Italy
- Education: Williams College; Yale Divinity School
- Occupations: lecturer, author, photographer
- Children: Lothrop Stoddard
- Writing career
- Genre: travelogues
- Notable works: John L. Stoddard's Lectures; The Stoddard Library; Rebuilding a Lost Faith

John Lawson Stoddard (April 24, 1850 – June 5, 1931) was an American lecturer, author and photographer. He was a pioneer in the use of the stereopticon or magic lantern, adding photographs to his popular lectures about his travels around the world. Because he published books related to his travels, he is credited with developing the genre of travelogues.

In 1935, Daniel Crane Taylor wrote, "Stoddard's rise to fame was spectacular and unprecedented in the annals of American entertainers. No American lecturer, musician, or actor has ever won so large a following in so short a time. From his second season, almost every lecture was sold out…He filled Daly's Theatre, one of the largest in New York, fifty times a season for ten years. …This would mean that Stoddard alone drew approximately one hundred thousand persons in New York each year."

== Early life ==
Stoddard was born in Brookline, Massachusetts to a wealthy family. He was the son of Sarah Lothrop and Lewis Tappan Stoddard.

He was educated at private schools in Boston. He attended Williams College, graduating with an A.B. in 1871. At Williams, he was a member of the fraternity Delta Psi (aka St. Anthony Hall). He studied theology at Yale Divinity School for two years, but left before he graduated.

== Career ==
During the 1873–1874 academic year, Stoddard taught the classics at Boston Latin School. Between 1874 and 1876, Stoddard began traveling around the world, mostly to Constantinople, Egypt, Greece, and Palestine. After two years of traveling, he returned to teaching.

In 1879, Stoddard turned his travel experiences into a series of popular lectures delivered throughout North America. He pioneered the used of the stereopticon, also known as the magic lantern, which gave his lectures the "gimmick" of a visual component—the black and white photographs Stoddard took on his travels. His lectures were so popular that he soon became a household name. Stoddard also continued to travel and gather new content for his programs, going to as he said, "nearly every part of the habitable globe." He would return to the United States in the winter, providing lectures in major cities on cities, life, and scenery of the Italian Lakes, Milan, Paris, the Orient, Rome, and even the United States. The demand for his lectures was so high that in New York City alone, he would give fifty sold-out presentations each season.

Stoddard began publishing books, including Red-Letter Days Abroad in 1884, Glimpses of the World in 1892, and Portfolio of Photographs which was issued in sixteen weekly installments starting in 1894 In 1897, he was invited to lecture before the U.S. Congress. However, there was not enough room in chambers, so he scheduled a private lecture for the representatives and their wives at the Columbia Theatre. As one writer noted, "The Theatre filled to capacity."

In April 1897, Stoddard retired from the lecture circuit a multi-millionaire at the age of 47. His lectures were published in book form as John L. Stoddard's Lectures with ten volumes from 1897 to 1898, and five supplements in 1901. The books include many photographs taken by Stoddard. In 1910, he selected the content for The Stoddard Library; A Thousand Hours of Entertainment with the World's Great Writers (12 volumes), with an accompanying handbook published in 1915.

During World War I, then ex-pat Stoddard's sympathies lay with the Central Powers, leading to his writing propaganda pamphlets which were published by the German-American Defense Committee in Germany and the United States. In 1914, he opened An American to Americans: John L. Stoddard Noted Author-Traveler Tells the Truth about Germany and the War in Europe with, "Dear Friends Across the Sea: I fear you have been misinformed about the present war. News must have reached you almost entirely from French and English sources. How incorrect news can be I know from personal experience." He goes on to explain that "every achievement of the Germans or Austrians was ignored or minimized." He also maintains that the war was not started by Emperor William and Germany's military, but by the Russians. He proclaims, "It is a people's war.… They are fighting for their very existence, threatened and surrounded by a world of foes."

In 1922, after his conversion to Catholicism, he became a realist in religion, publishing Rebuilding a Lost Faith, by an American Agnostic, a famous work of apologetics. Thereafter, he devoted his time to religious study and writing.

Stoddard was a proponent of the restoration of the Jews to Israel. In Volume 2 of his Lectures, he told the Jews, “You are a people without a country; there is a country without a people. Be united. Fulfill the dreams of your old poets and patriarchs. Go back, go back to the land of Abraham.” In 1891, Stoddard is also believed to be the first person to refer to the Jews as "a country without a nation," a phrase that would later become popular with Zionists in Europe. Stoddard's "Palestine lecture was very popular, delivered by a very popular man… [whose] career was at a zenith."

== Publications ==
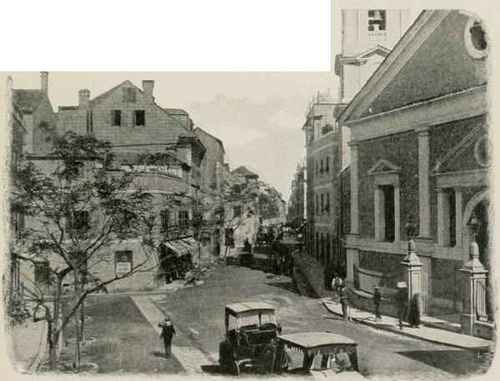
The Main Street of Gibraltar. Photo by Stoddard from his book Gibraltar

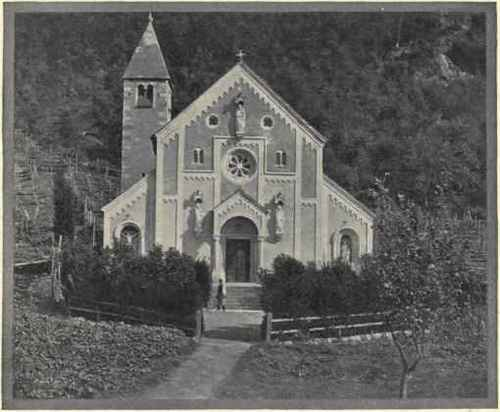
St.-Valentin, Merano, South Tyrol, Italy. Photo by Stoddard from Lectures

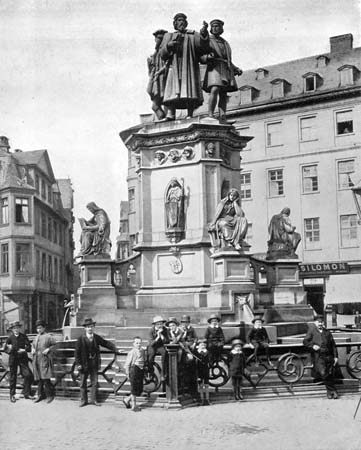
Gutenberg Monument, Frankfurt, Germany. Photo by Stoddard from Lectures

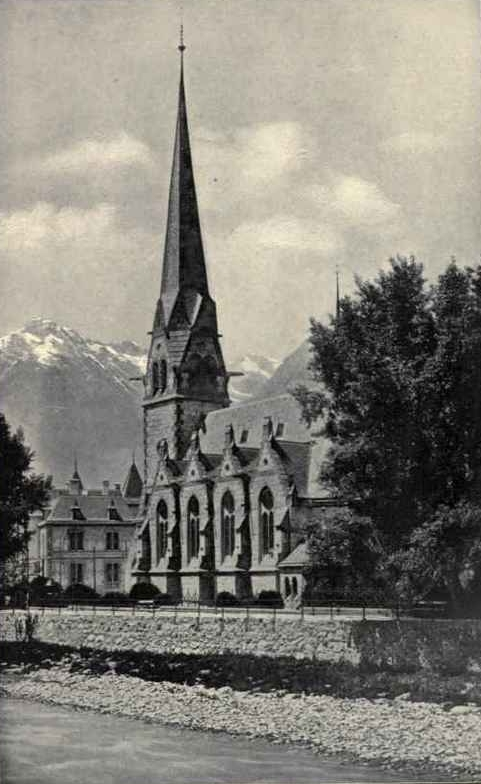
The German Protestant Church, Meran, South Tyrol, Italy. Photo by Stoddard from Lectures

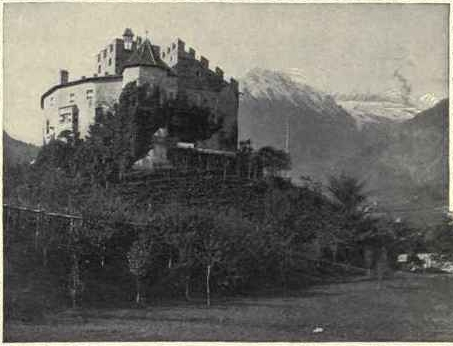
Schloss-Forst, Algund, South Tyrol, Italy. Photo by Stoddard from Lectures

=== Books ===
- Red Letter Days Abroad (1884)
- Scenic America (1890)
- Glimpses of the world; a Portfolio of Photographs.(1892)
- Portfolio of photographs: of Famous Scenes, Cities, and Paintings (1893)
- Napoléon: from Corsica to St. Helena (1894)
- A Trip Around the World with John L. Stoddard: a Collection of Photo-Engravings (1894)
- Portfolio of Photographs of Our Country and Our Neighbors (1894)
- Portfolio of Photographs - Photographic View of the Entire World of Nature and Art (1894)
- Portfolio Colonial... des Possessions et Dépendances Françaises.(1895)
- Scenic America, the Beauties of the Western Hemisphere (1897)
- Athens-Venice: Illustrated and Embellished with one-hundred and twenty-one Reproductions of Photographs (1897)
- China: Illustrated and Embellished with one-hundred and twenty-two Reproductions of Photographs (1897)
- Egypt: Illustrated and Embellished with one-hundred and nineteen Reproductions of Photographs (1897)
- India: Illustrated and Embellished with one-hundred and twelve Reproductions of Photographs (1897)
- Japan: Illustrated and Embellished with one-hundred and thirty-eight Reproductions of Photographs (1897)
- Jerusalem: Illustrated and Embellished with one-hundred and twenty-one Reproductions of Photographs (1897)
- Norway: Illustrated and Embellished with one-hundred and twenty-eight Reproductions of Photographs (1897)
- Switzerland: Illustrated and Embellished with one-hundred and twenty-one Reproductions of Photographs (1897)
- The Passion Play: Illustrated and Embellished with one-hundred and nineteen Reproductions of Photographs (1897)
- John L. Stoddard Lectures, v. 1 Norway, Switzerland, Athens, Venice (1897).
- John L. Stoddard Lectures, v. 2 Constantinople, Jerusalem, Egypt(1897).
- John L. Stoddard Lectures, v. 3 Japan I, Japan II, China (1897).
- John L. Stoddard Lectures, v. 4 India I, India II, The Passion Play (1897).
- John L. Stoddard Lectures, v. 5 Paris, La Belle France, Spain (1897).
- John L. Stoddard Lectures, v. 6 Berlin, Vienna, St. Petersburg, Moscow (1898).
- John L. Stoddard Lectures, v. 7 The Rhine, Belgium, Holland, Mexico (1898).
- John L. Stoddard Lectures, v. 8 Florence, Naples, Rome (1898).
- John L. Stoddard Lectures, v. 9 Scotland, England, London (1898).
- John L. Stoddard Lectures, v. 10 Southern California, Grand Cañon of the Colorado River, Yellowstone National Park (1898).
- From the Atlantic to the Pacific (1899)
- Famous Parks and Buildings of America (1899)
- John L. Stoddard Lectures Supplementary volumes: no. 1 / v. 11: Ireland I, Ireland II. Denmark. Sweden (1901).
- John L. Stoddard Lectures Supplementary volumes: no. 2 / v. 12: Canada I. Canada II, Malta. Gibraltar (1901).
- John L. Stoddard Lectures Supplementary volumes: no. 3 / v. 13: South Tyrol. Around Lake Garda. The Dolomites (1901).
- John L. Stoddard Lectures Supplementary volumes: no. 4 / v. 14: Sicily. Genoa. A drive through the Engadine (1901).
- John L. Stoddard Lectures Supplementary volumes: no. 5 / v. 15: Lake Como. The upper Danube. Bohemia (1901).
- Gibraltar 1–6 (1901).
- Beautiful Scenes of America (1902)
- Beautiful Scenes of America from Battery Park to the Golden Gate
- Rebuilding a Lost Faith, by an American Agnostic (1922)
- The Stoddard Library; A Thousand Hours of Entertainment with the World's Great Writers, 12 volumes (1910),
- The Stoddard Library Handbook (1915).
- Christ and the Critics (2 vols., 1926–27)
- Poems (1913)
- Poems on Lake Como (1914)
- Rebuilding a Lost Faith (1921)
- Twelve Years in the Catholic Church (1930)

=== Pamphlets ===
- An American to Americans: John L. Stoddard Noted Author–Traveler Tells the Truth about Germany and the War in Europe (1914)
- Why Is It? (1915)
- Amerikas Stellung zum Weltkriege (1915)
- Wilson oder Hughes?(1916)
- Was sollen wir mit Wilson tun?
- America and Germany (1916)
- La Decadence de l'Angleterre (1917)

=== Translations ===
- Felder, Hilarin. Christ and the Critics, Volume 1. translation of Jesus Christus (1924)
- Prat, Fernand. The Theology of Saint Paul, Volume 1 (1926)
- Prat, Fernand. The Theology of Saint Paul, Volume 2 (1927)
- Baunard, Louis. The Evening of Life (1930)
- Batiffol, Pierre. Saint Gregory the Great (1930)
- Verkade, Willibrord. Yesterdays of an Artist-Monk (1930)

== Popular culture ==
In F. Scot Fitzgerald's The Great Gatsby, John L Stoddard's Lectures are in Gatsby's library. One literary critic notes, "The Stoddard Lectures serve as a literary backdrop to the performance of Jay Gatsby, who had never read them, who had never cut the pages, but who staged his production elaborately and well, going as far as to buy not only real books but also the right kind of real books."

== Personal life ==
Stoddard married Mary Brown of Bangor, Maine on December 24, 1877. She was the daughter of Dr. William H. Brown, who was the mayor of Bangor. They had a son in 1883, Lothrop Stoddard. After some five years, the couple became estranged. When he retired from the lecture circuit in 1897, Stoddard moved to New York City. They divorced in 1900. He married Ida M. O'Donnell of Barnesville, Ohio on August 15, 1901.

After his second marriage, Stoddard moved to the Austrian Tyrol. Around 1906, he moved to Lake Como in Italy. In 1914, he moved to a villa near Merano, South Tyrol, Italy.

In 1917, Stoddard nearly died from typhus, leading him back to religion. Raised a Protestant, Stoddard was an agnostic for more than thirty years before converting, along with his wife, to Roman Catholicism in 1922.

During his later life, Stoddard used his fortune to support his adopted home of Merano. He contributed to building a secondary school and to a home for homeless youth, now used as a rehabilitation center.

Stoddard died in 1931 at his villa near Merano, Italy, at the age of 81.
