= Bronze (racial classification) =

Racial classification

Bronze race (Spanish: raza de bronce) is a term used since the early 20th century by Hispanic American writers of the indigenista and americanista schools to refer to the mestizo population that arose in the Americas with the arrival of Latin European (particularly Spanish) settlers and their intermingling with the New World's Amerindian peoples. The metaphorical referent bronze incorporates several metals, the combination of which strengthens the resulting alloy compared to each metal alone.

Mexican poet Amado Nervo wrote "La Raza de Bronce" ("The Bronze Race") as an elegiac poem in honor of former president Benito Juárez in 1902. Bolivian indigenista writer Alcides Arguedas used the term in his 1919 work, La Raza de Bronce, a study of the natives of the Andean Altiplano. It was later used by Mexican luminary José Vasconcelos in La Raza Cósmica (1925).

The term was revived in the 1960s by Chicano ethnic group MEChA to refer to Mexican Americans in the United States and the people in Mexico as a unified "race", similar to the black and white races. In this sense it is largely synonymous to the notion of the Chicano nation. The decision to call it a separate "race" may have been influenced by the contemporary negative views of "ethnic" or "nation" based nationalism and positive views of "race" based nationalism. The notion was first enunciated in the Plan Espiritual de Aztlán document.

== See also ==
- Brown (racial classification)
- La raza cósmica
- Melting pot (as metaphor for cultural fusion)
