= Brown identity =

Objective or subjective state of perceiving oneself as a brown person

Brown identity is the objective or subjective state of perceiving oneself as a brown person and as relating to being brown. The identity is subject to multiple contexts, as a part of media reporting or academic research, particularly in Asia, and the Western World.

== Background ==
Brown identity has been explored academically and both discussed and reported in a wide variety of contexts, being both an indigenous and diasporic concept, as well as a pluralistic phenomenon with overlapping, separate, and competing sub-factors. University of New Mexico's Vinay Harpalani has explored the concept in depth, observing that despite variance of skin tone, whether darker or lighter, skin color gradation normally "does not appear to play a major role for South Asian Americans claiming a Brown identity". Despite some identification outside binaries of color, Harpalani has demonstrated how the identity does allow a distinction between certain white and black identities:

For South Asian Americans, claiming Brownness allows them to establish a separate racial identity for themselves—one that is independent of White and Black Americans, but parallels those groups by employing a color-designated identity.

Dr Kumarini Silva has theorized how brownness and brown identity has, at times, even served as a cultural distraction from black-white race relations in the United States. Alternatively, co-authored by several academics with a range of ethnic minority backgrounds, assistant professor Fatima Zahrae Chrifi Alaoui has explored Arab Americans' connection to brown identity, theorizing how "a Black/White binary" can result in erasure of brownness and racial homelessness for brown people. In this regard, 2019 research by Sten Pultz Moslund - an associate professor at the University of Southern Denmark - identified separate and distinct black and brown identities emerging in the United Kingdom; observing the societal expression of cultural difference to the white majority by black Britons and Asian Britons since 2000.

== History ==
Since spring 2014, Ontario Human Rights Commission director Raj Dhir has presented the Understanding Anti-Brown Racism workshop, including at institutions such as Humber College. Dhir has proposed that brown identity may be a unique phenomenon for brown Canadians, partially resulting in distinct forms of discrimination not experienced by other minority groups. In 2014, Danielle Sandhu discussed the concept in Theorizing Brown Identity. Sandhu, a former president of the University of Toronto Students' Union, analyzed the utility of brown identity by South Asian Canadians.

In 2017, Canadian writer Naben Ruthnum suggested that brown identity was at risk of being "shaped by outside perception, by the imagination that the majority imposes upon us". Ruthnum's writing and research into the phenomenon, which he associates with South Asian food and culture, has been reviewed and explored in Canadian media.

In 2018, discussing his experiences as a British Asian, former featherweight world champion Naseem Hamed discussed the shift in brown identity and representations that occurred in Britain, during the years that followed the 9/11 attacks. Also of West Asian heritage, Dr Tufool Al-Nuaimi, an associate professor at Imperial College London, has discussed the experience of being a Saudi American in the post-9/11 United States, detailing how some "Arabs hid their brown identities behind bleached hair and blue contact lenses." American Psychological Association fellow, professor Sunil Bhatia has detailed, in his Citizenship and Migrant Identity in the Post 9/11 Era, how during this period Sikh American males suffered discrimination, as their brown identity came under scrutiny by government and media alike.

Actress Freida Pinto has spoken of the importance of the identity to her with the context of Hollywood, and how racial inclusivity in the industry should be meaningful, rather than what she described as token. In 2019, musician Sarathy Korwar's pluralistic view on the identity, within a spectrum of South Asian ethnicities, was reported in Indian media.

== Academic research ==
In 2012, Douglas College's Widyarini Sumartojo published research which proposed how, in an analysis of South Asian Canadians respondents, adoption of brown identity was somewhat of a counter to modern multiculturalism discourse, in that it appeared to "re-inscribe race onto multiculturalism". In Ayla Raza's 2014 "Negotiating "Brown": Youth Identity Formations in The Greater Toronto Area thesis, the academic demonstrated some test participants' bias toward perceiving only those of South Asian heritage as being brown, or possessing "an authentic "Brown" identity".

In 2016, University of North Carolina's Kumarini Silva proposed how a changing understanding of brown identity had occurred in the early 2000s. Her book Brown Threat explores how the identity evolved into more than a political, cultural or ethnic identifier, and into an increasingly hegemonic phenomenon in the context of the Western world.

== See also ==
- Cultural identity
- Ethnic identity development
- Ethnogenesis
- Group identity
- Identity (social science)
- Identity formation
- Identity politics
- Self-concept
- Social identity
- Passing (racial identity)
