= The Decline of the West =

Books by Oswald Spengler, rejecting the Eurocentric model of history

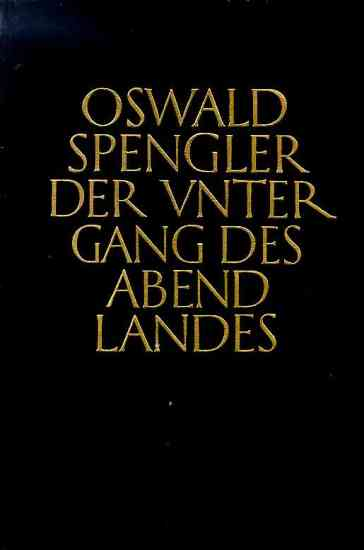
- Cover of Volume II, first edition, 1922
- Author: Oswald Spengler
- Original title: Der Untergang des Abendlandes
- Translator: Charles Francis Atkinson
- Language: German
- Subject: Philosophy of history
- Publication date: 1918 (Vol.I); 1922 (Vol.II)
- Publication place: Germany
- English publication date: 1926
- Media type: Print (hardcover and paperback)
- Pages: 507

The Decline of the West (German: Der Untergang des Abendlandes; or more literally, The Downfall of the Occident) is a two-volume work by Oswald Spengler. The first volume, subtitled Form and Actuality, was published in the summer of 1918. The second volume, subtitled Perspectives of World History, was published in 1922. The definitive edition of both volumes was published in 1923.

Spengler introduced his book as a "Copernican overturning"—a specific metaphor of societal collapse—involving the rejection of the Eurocentric view of history, especially the division of history into the linear "ancient-medieval-modern" rubric. According to Spengler, the meaningful units for history are not epochs but whole cultures which evolve as organisms. In his framework, the terms "culture" and "civilization" were given non-standard definitions, and cultures are described as having lifespans of about a thousand years of flourishing, and a thousand years of decline.

To Spengler, the natural lifespan of these groupings was to start as a "race"; become a "culture" as it flourished and produced new insights; and then become a "civilization". Spengler differed from others in not seeing the final civilization stage as necessarily "better" than the earlier stages; rather, the military expansion and self-assured confidence that accompanied the beginning of such a phase was a sign that the civilization had arrogantly decided it had already understood the world and would stop creating bold new ideas, which would eventually lead to a decline.

For example, to Spengler, the Classical world's culture stage was in Greek and early Roman thought; the expansion of the Roman Empire was its civilization phase; and the collapse of the Roman and Byzantine Empires their decline. He believed that the West was in its "evening", similar to the late Roman Empire, and approaching its eventual decline despite its seeming power.

Spengler recognized at least eight high cultures: Babylonian, Egyptian, Chinese, Indian, Mesoamerican (Mayan/Aztec), Classical (Greek/Roman, "Apollonian"), the non-Babylonian Middle East ("Magian"), and Western or European ("Faustian"). Spengler combined a number of groups under the "Magian" label; "Semitic", Arabian, Persian, and the Abrahamic religions in general as originating from them (Judaism, Christianity, Islam). Similarly, he combined various Mediterranean cultures of antiquity including both Ancient Greece and Ancient Rome as "Apollonian", and modern Westerners as "Faustian". According to Spengler, the Western world was ending and the final season, the "winter" of Faustian Civilization, was being witnessed. In Spengler's depiction, Western Man was a proud but tragic figure because, while he strives and creates, he secretly knows the actual goal will never be reached.

== Creation ==
Spengler said that he conceived the book sometime in 1911 and spent three years to finish the first draft. At the start of World War I, he began revising it and completed the first volume in 1917. It was published the following year when Spengler was 38 and was his first work, apart from his doctoral thesis on Heraclitus. The second volume was published in 1922. The first volume is subtitled Form and Actuality; the second volume is Perspectives of World-history. Spengler's own view of the aims and intentions of the work were described in the Prefaces and occasionally at other places such as in the preface to Man and Technics.

== Overview ==
Spengler's world-historical outlook was informed by many philosophers, including Goethe and to some degree Nietzsche. He described the significance of these two German philosophers and their influence on his worldview in his lecture Nietzsche and His Century. He called his analytical approach "Analogy". Using this approach, he proposed to "distinguish polarity and periodicity in the world".

Morphology was a key part of Spengler's philosophy of history, using a methodology which approached history and historical comparisons on the basis of civilizational forms and structure, without regard to function.

In a footnote, Spengler described the essential core of his philosophical approach toward history, culture, and civilization:

Plato and Goethe stand for the philosophy of Becoming, Aristotle and Kant the philosophy of Being... Goethe's notes and verse... must be regarded as the expression of a perfectly definite metaphysical doctrine. I would not have a single word changed of this: "The Godhead is effective in the living and not in the dead, in the becoming and the changing, not in the become and the set-fast; and therefore, similarly, the reason is concerned only to strive towards the divine through the becoming and the living, and the understanding only to make use of the become and the set-fast. (Letter to Eckermann)" This sentence comprises my entire philosophy.

Scholars now agree that the word "decline" more accurately renders the intended meaning of Spengler's original German word Untergang (often translated as the more emphatic 'downfall'; Unter being 'under' and gang being 'going', it is also accurately rendered in English as the 'going under' of the West). Spengler said that he did not mean to describe a catastrophic occurrence, but rather a protracted fall—a "twilight" or "sunset" (Sonnenuntergang is German for sunset, and Abendland, the German word for the West or the Occident, literally means the 'evening land'). In 1921, Spengler wrote that he might have used in his title the word Vollendung (which means 'fulfillment' or 'consummation') and saved a great deal of misunderstanding.

=== Spenglerian terms ===
Spengler invented certain terms with unusual meanings not commonly encountered in everyday discourse.

==== Culture/Civilization ====
Spengler used the two terms in a specific manner, loading them with particular values. For him, Civilization is what a Culture becomes once its creative impulses wane and become overwhelmed by critical impulses. Culture is the becoming, Civilization is the thing which a culture becomes. Rousseau, Socrates, and Buddha each mark the point where their Cultures transformed into Civilization. In Spengler's view, they each buried centuries of spiritual depth by presenting the world in rational terms—the intellect coming to rule once the soul has abdicated.

==== Apollonian/Magian/Faustian ====
These are Spengler's terms for Classical, Arabian and Western Cultures respectively.

Apollonian
Culture and Civilization is focused around Ancient Greece and Rome. Spengler saw its world view as being characterized by appreciation for the beauty of the human body, and a preference for the local and the present moment. The Apollonian world sense was described as ahistorical, citing Thucydides' claim in his Histories that nothing of importance had happened before him. Spengler said that the Classical Culture did not feel the same anxiety as the Faustian when confronted with an undocumented event.
Magian
Culture and Civilization includes the Jews from about 400 BC, early Christians and various Arabian religions up to and including Islam. He described it as having a world feeling that revolved around the concept of world as cavern, epitomized by the domed Mosque, and a preoccupation with essence. Spengler saw the development of this Culture as being distorted by a too-influential presence of older Civilizations, the initial vigorous expansionary impulses of Islam being in part a reaction against this.
Faustian
According to Spengler, the Faustian culture began in Western Europe around the 10th century, and had such expansionary power that by the 20th century it was covering the entire earth, with only a few regions where Islam provided an alternative world view. He described it as having a world feeling inspired by the concept of infinitely wide and profound space, the yearning towards distance and infinity. The term "Faustian" is a reference to Goethe's Faust (Johann Wolfgang von Goethe had a massive effect on Spengler), in which a dissatisfied Intellectual is willing to make a pact with the Devil in return for unlimited knowledge. Spengler believed that this represented the Western Man's limitless metaphysic, unrestricted thirst for knowledge, and constant confrontation with the Infinite.

==== Pseudomorphosis ====
The concept of pseudomorphosis is one that Spengler borrows from mineralogy and is introduced as a way of explaining what he calls half-developed or only partially manifested Cultures. Specifically, pseudomorphosis refers to an older Culture or Civilization being so deeply ingrained that a young Culture cannot find its own form and full expression of itself. In Spengler's words, this leads to the young soul being cast in the old molds, young feelings then stiffen in senile practices, and instead of expanding creatively, it fosters hate toward the older Culture.

Spengler believed that a Magian pseudomorphosis began with the Battle of Actium, in which the gestating Arabian Culture was represented by Mark Antony and lost to the Classical Civilization. The battle was different from the conflict between Rome and Greece, which had been fought out at Cannae and Zama, with Hannibal being the representative of Hellenism. He said that Antony should have won at Actium, and his victory would have freed the Magian Culture, but his defeat imposed Roman Civilization on it.

In Russia, Spengler saw a young, undeveloped Culture in a pseudomorphosis under the Faustian (Petrine) form. He said that Peter the Great distorted the tsarism of Russia to the dynastic form of Western Europe. The burning of Moscow, as Napoleon was set to invade, he described as a primitive expression of hatred toward the foreigner. In the following entry of Alexander I into Paris, the Holy Alliance and the Concert of Europe, he said that Russia was forced into an artificial history before its culture was ready or capable of understanding its burden. This would result in a hatred toward Europe, which Spengler said poisoned the womb of an emerging new Culture in Russia. While he does not name the Culture, he said that Tolstoy is its past and Dostoevsky is its future.

==== Becoming/Being ====
For Spengler, becoming is the basic element and being is static and secondary, not the other way around. He said that his philosophy in a nutshell is contained in these lines from Goethe: "the God-head is effective in the living and not in the dead, in the becoming and the changing, not in the become and the set-fast; and therefore, similarly the intuition is concerned only to strive towards the divine through the becoming and the living, and logic only to make use of the become and the set-fast".

==== Blood/Race ====
Spengler described blood as the only power which is strong enough to overthrow money, which he saw as the dominant power of his age. Blood is commonly understood to mean race-feeling, and this concept is partially true but it is misleading. Spengler's concept of race had nothing to do with ethnic identity, so in that sense, he was hostile toward racists. The book states that a population becomes a race when it is united in outlook, regardless of its ethnic origins. Spengler also states that the final struggle with money will be a battle between capitalism and socialism, but again, it will be socialism with a specific definition: "the will to call into life a mighty politico-economic order that transcends all class interests, a system of lofty thoughtfulness and duty sense". He also writes "A power can be overthrown only by another power, not by a principle, and only one power that can confront money is left. Money is overthrown and abolished by blood. Life is alpha and omega ... It is the fact of facts ... Before the irresistible rhythm on the generation-sequence, everything built up by the waking–consciousness in its intellectual world vanishes at the last."

=== Spengler's cultures ===
Spengler said that eight Hochkulturen or high cultures have existed:

- Babylonian
- Egyptiac
- Indic
- Sinic
- Mesoamerican (Mayan/Aztec)
- Apollonian or Classical (Greek/Roman)
- Magian or Arabian
- Faustian or Western (European)

The "Decline" is largely concerned with the Classical and Western (and to some degree Magian) Cultures, but some examples are taken from the Chinese and Egyptian. He said that each Culture arises within a specific geographical area and is defined by its internal coherence of style in terms of art, religious behavior and psychological perspective. In addition, each Culture is described as having a conception of space which is expressed by an "Ursymbol". Spengler said that his idea of Culture is justifiable through the existence of recurrent patterns of development and decline across the thousand years of each Culture's active lifetime.

Spengler did not classify the Southeast Asian and Peruvian (Incan, etc.) cultures as Hochkulturen. He thought that Russia was still defining itself, but was bringing into being a Hochkultur. The Indus Valley civilization had not been discovered at the time he was writing, and its relationship with later Indian civilization remained unclear for some time.

== Themes ==
=== Meaning of history ===
Spengler distinguished between ahistorical peoples and peoples caught up in world history. While he recognized that all people are a part of history, he said that only certain Cultures have a wider sense of historical involvement, meaning that some people see themselves as part of a grand historical design or tradition, while others view themselves in a self-contained manner and have no world-historical consciousness.

For Spengler, a world-historical view is about the meaning of history itself, breaking the historian or observer out of a crude, culturally parochial classification of history. By learning about different courses taken by other civilizations, people can better understand their own culture and identity. He said that those who still maintain a historical view of the world are the ones who continue to "make" history. Spengler said that life and humankind as a whole have an ultimate aim. However, he maintains a distinction between world-historical peoples, and ahistorical peoples—the former will have a historical destiny as part of a High Culture, while the latter will have a merely zoological fate. He said that world-historical man's destiny is self-fulfillment as a part of his Culture. Further, Spengler said that not only is pre-cultural man without history, he loses his historical weight as his Culture becomes exhausted and becomes a more and more defined Civilization.

For example, Spengler classifies Classical and Indian civilizations as ahistorical, comparing them to the Egyptian and Western civilizations which developed conceptions of historical time. He sees all Cultures as equal in the study of world-historical development. This leads to a kind of historical relativism or dispensationalism. Historical data, in Spengler's mind, are an expression of their historical time, contingent upon and relative to that context. Thus, the insights of one era are not unshakable or valid in another time or Culture—"there are no eternal truths", and each individual has a duty to look beyond one's own Culture to see what individuals of other Cultures have with equal certainty created for themselves. He said that what is significant is not whether the past thinkers' insights are relevant today, but whether they were exceptionally relevant to the great facts of their own time.

=== Culture and civilization ===
Spengler's conception of Culture was organic: primitive Culture is simply the sum of its constituent and incoherent parts (individuals, tribes, clans, etc.). Higher Culture, in its maturity and coherence, becomes an organism in its own right, according to Spengler. A Culture is described as sublimating the various customs, myths, techniques, arts, peoples, and classes into a single strong undiffused historical tendency.

Spengler divided the concepts of Culture and Civilization, the former focused inward and growing, the latter outward and merely expanding. However, he sees Civilization as the destiny of every Culture. The transition is not a matter of choice—it is not the conscious will of individuals, classes, or peoples that decides. He said that while Cultures are "things-becoming", Civilizations are the "thing-become", with the distinction being that Civilizations are what Cultures become when they are no longer creative and growing. As the conclusion of a Culture's arc of growth, Civilizations are described as outwardly focused, and in that sense artificial or insincere. As an example, Spengler used the Greeks and Romans, saying that the imaginative Greek Culture declined into wholly practical Roman Civilization.

Spengler also compared the "world-city" and -province (urban and rural) as concepts analogous to Civilization and Culture respectively, with the city drawing upon and collecting the life of broad surrounding regions. He said there is a "true-type" rural-born person, in contrast to city-dwellers who are allegedly nomadic, traditionless, irreligious, matter-of-fact, clever, unfruitful, and contemptuous of the countryman. In his view, the cities contain only a "mob", not a people, and are hostile to the traditions that represent Culture (in Spengler's view these traditions are: nobility, the Christian Church, privileges, dynasties, convention in art, and limits on scientific knowledge). He said that city-dwellers possess cold intelligence that confounds peasant wisdom, a naturalism in attitudes towards sex which are a return to primitive instincts, and a reduced inner religiousness. Further, Spengler saw urban wage disputes and large entertainment expenditures as the final aspects that signal the closing of Culture and the rise of the Civilization.

Spengler had a low opinion of Civilizations, even those that engaged in significant expansion, because he said that expansion was not actual growth. One of his principal examples was that of Roman "world domination". In his view, the Romans faced no significant resistance to their expansion, meaning it was not an achievement as they did not so much conquer their empire, but rather simply took possession of that which lay open to everyone. Spengler said this is a contrast with Roman displays of Cultural energy during the Punic Wars. After the Battle of Zama, Spengler believes that the Romans never waged, or even were capable of waging, a war against a competing great military power.

=== Races, peoples, and cultures ===
According to Spengler, a race has "roots", like a plant, which connect it to a landscape. "If, in that home, the race cannot be found, this means the race has ceased to exist. A race does not migrate. Men migrate, and their successive generations are born in ever-changing landscapes; but the landscape exercises a secret force upon the extinction of the old and the appearance of the new one." In this instance, he uses the word "race" in the tribal and cultural rather than the biological sense, a 19th-century use of the word still common when Spengler wrote.

For this reason, he said a race is not exactly like a plant:

Science has completely failed to note that race is not the same for rooted plants as it is for mobile animals, that with the micro-cosmic side of life a fresh group of characteristics appear and that for the animal world it is decisive. Nor again has it perceived that a completely different significance must be attached to 'races' when the word denotes subdivisions within the integral race "Man". With its talk of casual concentration it sets up a soulless concentration of superficial characters, and blots out the fact that here the blood and there the power of the land over the blood are expressing themselves—secrets that cannot be inspected and measured, but only livingly experienced from eye to eye. Nor are scientists at one as to the relative rank of these superficial characters…

Spengler writes that,

Comradeship breeds races... Where a race-ideal exists, as it does, supremely, in the Early period of a culture... the yearning of a ruling class towards this ideal, its will to be just so and not otherwise, operates (quite independently of the choosing of wives) towards actualizing this idea and eventually achieves it.

He distinguishes this from the sort of pseudo-anthropological notions commonly held when the book was written, and he dismisses the idea of "an Aryan skull and a Semitic skull". He also does not believe language is itself sufficient to create races, and that "the mother tongue" signifies "deep ethical forces" in Late Civilizations rather than Early Cultures, when a race is still developing the language that fits its "race-ideal".

Closely connected to race, Spengler defined a "people" as a unit of the soul, saying, "The great events of history were not really achieved by peoples; they themselves created the peoples. Every act alters the soul of the doer." He described such events as including migrations and wars, saying that the American people did not migrate from Europe, but were formed by events such as the American Revolution and the American Civil War. "Neither unity of speech nor physical descent is decisive." He said that what distinguishes a people from a population is "the inwardly lived experience of 'we'", and that this exists so long as a people's soul lasts: "The name Roman in Hannibal's day meant a people, in Trajan's time nothing more than a population." In Spengler's view, "Peoples are neither linguistic nor political nor zoological, but spiritual units."

Spengler disliked the contemporary trend of using a biological definition for race, saying, "Of course, it is quite often justifiable to align peoples with races, but 'race' in this connexion must not be interpreted in the present-day Darwinian sense of the word. It cannot be accepted, surely, that a people were ever held together by the mere unity of physical origin, or, if it were, could maintain that unity for ten generations. It cannot be too often reiterated that this physiological provenance has no existence except for science—never for folk-consciousness—and that no people was ever stirred to enthusiasm by this ideal of blood purity. In race (Rasse haben) there is nothing material but something cosmic and directional, the felt harmony of a Destiny, the single cadence of the march of historical Being. It is the incoordination of this (wholly metaphysical) beat which produces race hatred... and it is resonance on this beat that makes the true love—so akin to hate—between man and wife."

To Spengler, peoples are formed from early prototypes during the Early phase of a Culture. In his view, "Out of the people-shapes of the Carolingian Empire—the Saxons, Swabians, Franks, Visigoths, Lombards—arise suddenly the Germans, the French, the Spaniards, the Italians." He describes these peoples as products of the spiritual "race" of the great Cultures, and "people under a spell of a Culture are its products and not its authors. These shapes in which humanity is seized and moulded possess style and style-history no less than kinds of art or mode of thought. The people of Athens is a symbol not less than the Doric temple, the Englishman not less than modern physics. There are peoples of Apollonian, Magian, and Faustian cast ... World history is the history of the great Cultures, and peoples are but the symbolic forms and vessels in which the men of these Cultures fulfill their Destinies."

In saying that race and culture are tied together, Spengler echoes ideas similar to those of Friedrich Ratzel and Rudolf Kjellén. These ideas, which figure prominently in the second volume of the book, were common throughout German culture at the time.

In his later works, such as Man and Technics (1931) and The Hour of Decision (1933), Spengler expanded upon his "spiritual" theory of race and tied it to his metaphysical notion of eternal war and his belief that "Man is a beast of prey". The authorities however banned the book.

=== Religion and secularity ===
Spengler differentiates between manifestations of religion that appear within a Civilization's developmental cycle. He sees each Culture as having an initial religious identity, which arises out of the fundamental principle of the culture, and follows a trajectory correlating with that of the Culture. The Religion eventually results in a reformation-like period, after the Culture-Ideal has reached its peak and fulfillment. Spengler views a reformation as representative of decline: the reformation is followed by a period of rationalism, and then a period of second religiousness that correlates with decline. He said that the intellectual creativity of a Culture's Late period begins after the reformation, usually ushering in new freedoms in science.

According to Spengler, the scientific stage associated with post-reformation Puritanism contains the fundamentals of Rationalism, and eventually rationalism spreads throughout the Culture and becomes the dominant school of thought. To Spengler, Culture is synonymous with religious creativeness, and every great Culture begins with a religious trend that arises in the countryside, is carried through to the cultural cities, and ends in materialism in the world-cities.

Spengler believed that Enlightenment rationalism undermines and destroys itself, and described a process that passes from unlimited optimism to unqualified skepticism. He said that Cartesian self-centered rationalism leads to schools of thought that do not cognize outside of their own constructed worlds, ignoring actual every-day life experience, and applies criticism to its own artificial world until it exhausts itself in meaninglessness. In his view, the masses give rise to the Second Religiousness in reaction to the educated elites, which manifests as deep suspicion of academia and science.

Spengler said that the Second Religiousness is a harbinger of the decline of mature Civilization into an ahistorical state and occurs concurrently with Caesarism, the final political constitution of Late Civilization. He describes Caesarism as the rise of an authoritarian ruler, a new 'emperor' akin to Caesar or Augustus, taking the reins in reaction to a decline in creativity, ideology and energy after a Culture has reached its high point and become a Civilization. He said that the Second Religiousness and Caesarism demonstrate a lack of youthful strength or creativity, and the Second Religiousness is simply a rehashing of the original religious trend of the Culture.

=== Democracy, media, and money ===
Spengler said that democracy is the political weapon of "money", and the media are the means through which money operates a democratic political system. The penetration of money's power throughout a society is described as another marker of the shift from Culture to Civilization.

Democracy and plutocracy are equivalent in Spengler's argument, and he said the "tragic comedy of the world-improvers and freedom-teachers" is that they are simply assisting money to be more effective. He believed that the principles of equality, natural rights, universal suffrage, and freedom of the press are all disguises for class war of the bourgeois against the aristocracy. Freedom, to Spengler, is a negative concept, only entailing the repudiation of any tradition. He said that freedom of the press requires money, and entails ownership, meaning that it serves money. Similarly, since suffrage involves electoral campaigns, which involve donations, elections serve money as well. Spengler said that the ideologies espoused by candidates, whether Socialism or Liberalism, are set in motion by, and ultimately serve, only money.

Spengler said that in his era money has already won, in the form of democracy. However, he said that in destroying the old elements of the Culture, it prepares the way for the rise of a new and overpowering figure, who he calls the Caesar. Before such a leader, money collapses, and in the Imperial Age the politics of money fades away.

Spengler said that the use of one's constitutional rights requires money, and that voting can only work as designed in the absence of organized leadership working on the election process. He said that if the election process is organized by political leaders, to the extent that money allows, the vote ceases to be truly significant. In his view, it is no more than a recorded opinion of the masses on the organizations of government over which they possess no positive influence. He said that the greater the concentration of wealth in individuals, the more the fight for political power revolves around questions of money. He believed that this was the necessary end of mature democratic systems, rather than being corruption or degeneracy.

On the subject of the press, Spengler said that instead of conversations between men, the press and the "electrical news-service keep the waking-consciousness of whole people and continents under a deafening drum-fire of theses, catchwords, standpoints, scenes, feelings, day by day and year by year". He said that money uses the media to turn itself into force—the more spent, the more intense its influence. In addition, a functioning press requires universal education, and he said schooling leads to a demand for the shepherding of the masses, which then becomes an object of party politics. To Spengler, people who believe in the ideal of education prepare the way for the power of the press, and eventually for the rise of the Caesar. He also said there is no longer a need for leaders to impose military service, because the press will stir the public into a frenzy and force their leaders into a conflict.

Spengler believed that the only force which can counter money is blood. He said that Marx's critique of capitalism was put forth in the same language and on the same assumptions as capitalism, meaning it is more a recognition of capitalism's veracity, than a refutation. He said the only aim of Marxism is to "confer upon objects the advantage of being subjects".

=== Future ===
The formation of the "battling society of nations" marks the beginning of every civilization. In the following phase, the size of armies and the scale of warfare increase. The time of Warring States began with Napoleon, who introduced the idea of military world domination different from the preceding European maritime empires. The trend continued with the American Civil War and the "explosion" of the First World War, (the book was published before the Second World War). The following centure was one of Warring States. "Within two generations" (from 1922) the contest "for the heritage of the whole world", with continents at stake, got started. The destinies of small states are "without importance to the great march of things". There are ages of "gigantic conflicts", like the Warring States in China and wars in the contemporary Roman world. In one such age we find ourselves today, and it is accelerated by modern military technology.

"The way from Alexander to Caesar is unambiguous and unavoidable, and the strongest nation of any and every culture, consciously or unconsciously, willing or unwilling, has had to tread it. From the rigor of these facts there is no refuge." The Hague Conference of 1907 was the prelude of World War, the Washington Conference of 1921 will have been that of other wars. "The alternatives now are to stand fast or go under—there is no middle course. It falls to us to live in the most trying times known to history of a great culture." The strongest race will win and seize the management of the world.

Synchronously with the acceleration of warfare and the rise of the strongest race to world management, there occurs an "accelerating demolition of ancient forms that leaves the path clear to Caesarism". This phase began in China c. 600 BC, the Mediterranean c. 450 BC and the modern world c. 1700. Comparing these three ages, Spengler states that "Caesarism" is an inevitable product of such an age and it "suddenly outlines itself on the horizon". In China the culmination occurred with the First Emperor, in the Mediterranean with Sulla and Pompey and in our world is forthcoming. Spengler selected the Chinese and Roman Empires as most relevant models for the future and argued that the modern world undergoes the same evolution towards "Caesarism" but now on world-wide scale. The present is the last century of the pre-Imperial age of world history to be followed by the "Imperial Age" with the rise of Caesar. The transition from "Napoleonism to Caesarism" is an evolutionary stage universal to every culture and takes two centuries. Hence, modern "Caesarism" is expected in "one century" .

Caesarism grows on the soil of democracy which is dictatorial money-economics. The mighty ones of the future may possess the Earth as their private property, but they would have a task of caring for this world and this task conflicts with the interests of democratic / money-power age. Hence, there now sets in the final battle in the struggle democracy vs "Caesarism" in which the latter is destined to prevail. "The coming of Caesarism breaks the dictature of money and its political weapon democracy."

Despite Spengler's negative view of democracy, he is neither positive about "Caesarism". Once the "Imperial Age" of world history has arrived, there are no more great politics. People manage with the situation as it is. In the period of Warring States, "torrents of blood had reddened the pavements of all world cities for the winning of rights without which life seemed not worth the living. A hundred years into the Imperial Age, and even the historians will no longer understand the old controversies." "Caesarism" means a "kind of government which, irrespective of any constitutional formulation that it may have, is in its inward self a return to thorough formlessness". It does not matter that the Caesars in history disguised their position under antique forms (such as The Senate and the Roman People in the Roman Imperial Age). The spirit of these forms was dead, and so all institutions, however carefully maintained, were thenceforth destitute of all meaning and weight. Real importance centered in the wholly personal power exercised by the Caesar. A form-fulfilled world degenerates into primitivism and historical periods are replaced by biological stretches of time. Wars between states end to be replaced by private feuds between Caesars. With the accomplished state of "Caesarism", "high history lays itself down weary to sleep. Man becomes a plant again, dumb and enduring."

== Reception ==
The Decline of the West was widely read by German intellectuals. It has been suggested that it intensified a sense of crisis in Germany following the end of World War I. George Steiner suggested that the work can be seen as one of several books that resulted from the crisis of German culture following Germany's defeat in World War I, comparable in this respect to the philosopher Ernst Bloch's The Spirit of Utopia (1918), the theologian Franz Rosenzweig's The Star of Redemption (1921), the theologian Karl Barth's The Epistle to the Romans (1922), Nazi Party leader Adolf Hitler's Mein Kampf (1925), and the philosopher Martin Heidegger's Being and Time (1927).

The book received unfavorable reviews from most scholars even before the release of the second volume, and the stream of criticisms continued for decades. Nevertheless, in Germany the book enjoyed popular success: by 1926 some 100,000 copies were sold.

A 1928 Time review of the second volume of Decline described the immense influence and controversy Spengler's ideas enjoyed in the 1920s: "When the first volume of The Decline of the West appeared in Germany a few years ago, thousands of copies were sold. Cultivated European discourse quickly became Spengler-saturated. Spenglerism spurted from the pens of countless disciples. It was imperative to read Spengler, to sympathize or revolt. It still remains so."

=== Critique ===
In 1950, the philosopher Theodor W. Adorno published an essay entitled "Spengler after the Downfall" (in German: Spengler nach dem Untergang) to commemorate what would have been Spengler's 70th birthday. Adorno reassessed Spengler's thesis three decades after it had been put forth, in light of the catastrophic destruction of Nazi Germany (although Spengler had not meant Untergang in a cataclysmic sense, this was how most authors after World War II interpreted it). As a member of the Frankfurt School of Marxist critical theory, Adorno said he wanted to "turn (Spengler's) reactionary ideas toward progressive ends". He believed that Spengler's insights were often more profound than those of his more liberal contemporaries, and his predictions more far-reaching. Adorno saw the rise of the Nazis as confirmation of Spengler's ideas about "Caesarism" and the triumph of force-politics over the market. Adorno also drew parallels between Spengler's description of the Enlightenment and his own analysis. However, Adorno also criticized Spengler for an overly deterministic view of history, which ignored the unpredictable role that human initiative plays at all times. He quoted the Austrian poet Georg Trakl (1887–1914): "How sickly seem everything that grows" (from the poem "Heiterer Frühling") to illustrate that decay contains new opportunities for renewal. He also criticizes Spengler's use of language, which he called overly reliant on fetishistic terms like "Soul", "Blood" and "Destiny".

György Lukács criticized The Decline of the West in his book 1953 The Destruction of Reason, in a chapter focusing on Oswald Spengler. Outlining Spengler as "dilettantish amateur" on factual level – and being of lesser "philosophical level" compared to the German vitalist (Lebensphilosophie) and/or irrationalist thinkers before him – Lukács saw The Decline of the West as a "victory of extreme historical relativism". Describing the work of being amateurish, pseudo-historical and exemplary of irrationalist thought, Lukács attacked Spengler for "rejecting causality and laws, recognizing them as the only historical phenomena of given epochs and denying them any competence for scientific and philosophical methodology" and "substituting causality for analogy", making the "(often shallow) similarities his canon of investigation". Lukács argued that the work was primarily Spengler's attempt to turn "all fields of human knowledge subservient to his philosophy of history, no matter whether he personally had truly mastered them or whether they, in themselves, had already yielded unequivocal, philosophically applicable results".

German philosopher and sociologist Max Horkheimer also saw Decline of the West and Spengler in negative light, citing the work as a "superficial synthesis of poorly understood material from a wide variety of fields" and condemning Spengler of being a "worst sort" of Lebensphilosophie populist.

Pope Benedict XVI disagreed with Spengler's "biologistic" thesis, citing the arguments of Arnold J. Toynbee, who distinguished between "technological-material progress" and spiritual progress in Western civilizations.

=== Influenced ===
- Henry Kissinger was known to be heavily influenced by The Decline of the West, having written his honors thesis on Spengler, and confirming to William F. Buckley Jr. that he gave an abridged edition of the book to President Richard Nixon while he was his Secretary of State and National Security Advisor.
- The Trinidadian Marxist critic C.L.R. James had a "deep interest in Spengler" and Decline had "a tremendous influence on him."
- Samuel Huntington seems to have been heavily influenced by Spengler's The Decline of the West in his "Clash of Civilizations" theory.
- Joseph Campbell, an American professor, writer and orator who is best known for his work in the fields of comparative mythology and comparative religion, claimed that Decline of the West was the biggest influence on him.
- Northrop Frye, reviewing the Decline of the West, said that "If... nothing else, it would still be one of the world's great Romantic poems".
- Oswald Mosley identified the book as a critical influence on his political conversion from far-left to far-right politics and his subsequent foundation of the British Union of Fascists.
- Ludwig Wittgenstein named Spengler as one of his philosophical influences.
- Camille Paglia has listed The Decline of the West as one of the influences on her 1990 work of literary criticism Sexual Personae.
- Nobel Prize winning author Saul Bellow stated that he "had great respect for Spengler in [his] youth". He even named one of his characters in The Dean's December 'Dewey Spangler' [sic].
- D.H. Lawrence was heavily influenced by The Decline of the West. Page two of the first version of Lady Chatterley's Lover has the sentence, "But by the time that the Untergang des Abendlands appeared, Clifford was a smashed man, and her life was smashed."
- Aleksandr Dugin, known as "Vladimir Putin's brain", "quotes Oswald Spengler quite extensively."
- The modernist poet T.S. Eliot is known to have been influenced by The Decline of the West.
- William S. Burroughs referred repeatedly to Decline as a pivotal influence on his thoughts and work. He spoke of how he introduced the text to Jack Kerouac and Allen Ginsberg.
- Martin Heidegger was deeply affected by Spengler's work, and referred to him often in his early lecture courses.
- James Blish used many of Spengler's ideas in his books Cities in Flight.
- Henry Miller was heavily influenced by the book. Spengler is even mentioned on the fifth page of Tropic of Cancer.
- Francis Parker Yockey wrote Imperium: The Philosophy of History and Politics, published under the pen name Ulick Varange in 1948. In its introduction, this book is described as a "sequel" to The Decline of the West.
- Whittaker Chambers often refers to "Crisis", a concept which was influenced by Spengler, in Witness (it is mentioned in more than 50 pages, including the first page, where it is mentioned in a dozen places), in Cold Friday (1964, more than 30 pages), and in other pre-Hiss Case writings. ("His central feeling, repeated in hundreds of statements and similies, is that the West is going into its Spenglerian twilight, a breaking down in which Communism is more a symptom than an agent.")
- The title of Pat Buchanan book The Death of the West, is a reference to The Decline of the West. A related case is that of Éric Zemmour's The French Suicide.
- Punk rock musician Darby Crash was obsessed with the book, to the extent that the Penelope Spheeris named her documentary about the Crash and the broader Los Angeles punk scene The Decline of Western Civilization.
- Willa Cather was influenced by The Decline of the West, especially in her novel The Professor's House (1925).
- Whit Stillman is known to be influenced by Spenglerian themes. His film Metropolitan (1990) features the character of Tom reading from passages of The Decline of the West.
- Evelyn Waugh's novel Decline and Fall is an allusion to both The Decline of the West and Edward Gibbon's The Decline and Fall of the Roman Empire.
- F. Scott Fitzgerald is said to have "come under the spell of Oswald Spengler's 'Decline of the West'", such that it directly influenced The Great Gatsby and Tender is the Night. He said in a 1940 letter to his editor, Maxwell Perkins, "I read [Spengler] the same summer I was writing The Great Gatsby and I don't think I quite recovered from him."
- H. P. Lovecraft was heavily influenced by the book.
- Philosopher Michael Potts has argued that J.R.R. Tolkien's The Lord of the Rings takes after The Decline of the West, "consciously or not."
- William Gaddis was heavily influenced by the book.
- Malcolm X was influenced by the book.
- Far-right American political commentator Nicholas J. Fuentes has said he is influenced by the ideas of Spengler.
- American economist and Senior Advisor for the Trump Administration's Department of State David P. Goldman is known for having written at the Asia Times under the pseudonym 'Spengler'.
- Cormac McCarthy found Spengler "a rich source of inspiration" for his work. According to Michael Lynn Crews, "The title of his first western, Blood Meridian: Or the Evening Redness in the West, is nothing short of an homage to Spengler’s Decline of the West." McCarthy's novels Suttree and Stella Maris are also influenced heavily by Spengler, with the latter featuring characters directly discussing Decline of the West.

== Bibliography ==
- Spengler, Oswald. The Decline of the West. Ed. Arthur Helps, and Helmut Werner. Trans. Charles F. Atkinson. Preface Hughes, H. Stuart. New York: Oxford UP, 1991. ISBN 0-19-506751-7

=== Editions ===
- Between 1924 and 1926, both volumes were translated to English and published by A.A Knopf
- In 2021, unabridged versions of both volumes of The Decline of the West (Form & Actuality and its follow-up Perspectives of World-History) were reissued by Arktos Media, which retains the right to publish the original English translations by Charles Francis Atkinson.

== See also ==
- All That Is Solid Melts into Air § Epilogue: The Faustian and Pseudo-Faustian Age
- Conservative revolution – German national-conservative movement during the Weimar Republic (1918–1933)
- Degeneration theory – Concept from the 18th and 19th centuries
- Historic recurrence – Repetition of similar events in history
- On the Plurality of Civilisations – Book by Feliks Koneczny
- Social cycle theory – Type of social theories
