= Man and Technics =

1931 book by Oswald Spengler

- Title page for Der Mensch und die Technik (1931)
- Author: Oswald Spengler
- Original title: Der Mensch und die Technik
- Publication date: 1931
- English publication date: 1932
- ISBN: 0-89875-983-8
- Text: Man and Technics at Internet Archive

Man and Technics: A Contribution to a Philosophy of Life (German: Der Mensch und die Technik) is a 1931 book by Oswald Spengler, in which the author discusses a critique of technology and industrialism and uses the Nietzschean concept of the will to power to understand man's nature.

Building on his previous ideas in The Decline of the West, Spengler argues that many of the Western world's great achievements may soon become spectacles for our descendants to marvel at, as we do with the pyramids of Egypt or the baths of Rome. He points in particular to the tendency of Western technology to spread to hostile "colored races" which would then use the weapons against the West. In Spengler's view, western culture will be destroyed from within by materialism, and destroyed by others through economic competition and warfare.

The book ends in the famous passage, indicating that to Faustian man:

[a]lready the danger is so great, for every individual, every class, every people, that to cherish any illusion whatever is deplorable. Time does not suffer itself to be halted; there is no question of prudent retreat or wise renunciation. Only dreamers believe that there is a way out. Optimism is cowardice.

We are born into this time and must bravely follow the path to the destined end. There is no other way. Our duty is to hold on to the lost position, without hope, without rescue, like that Roman soldier whose bones were found in front of a door in Pompeii, who, during the eruption of Vesuvius, died at his post because they forgot to relieve him. That is greatness. That is what it means to be a thoroughbred. The honourable end is the one thing that can not be taken from a man.
