= The Hour of Decision =

1933 book by Oswald Spengler

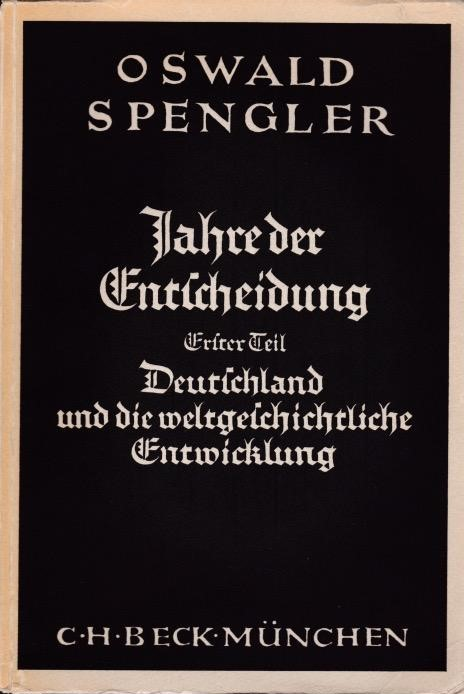
- Author: Oswald Spengler
- Original title: Jahre der Entscheidung
- Translator: Charles Francis Atkinson
- Language: German
- Publisher: C. H. Beck
- Publication date: 1933
- Publication place: Germany
- English publication date: 1934
- Pages: 165

The Hour of Decision: Germany and World-Historical Evolution (German: Jahre der Entscheidung. Deutschland und die weltgeschichtliche Entwicklung) is a 1933 book by the German writer Oswald Spengler. Spengler argued that Western culture, and its basis in aristocratic social structures, was under serious threat from two directions: "downward" and "outward", with which he meant class and ethnicity. The book was published in English translation by Charles Francis Atkinson in 1934.

The book was heavily criticised by the National Socialists, who came to power shortly before it was published. Johann von Leers condemned it as counter-revolutionary and an expression of "ice-cold contempt for the people". In a 2024 book, the historian Volker Weiß argues that the arguments in the book are typical for the kind of Spenglerian thought the European New Right appreciates.
