= Thomas Fasbender =

German journalist and author (born 1957)

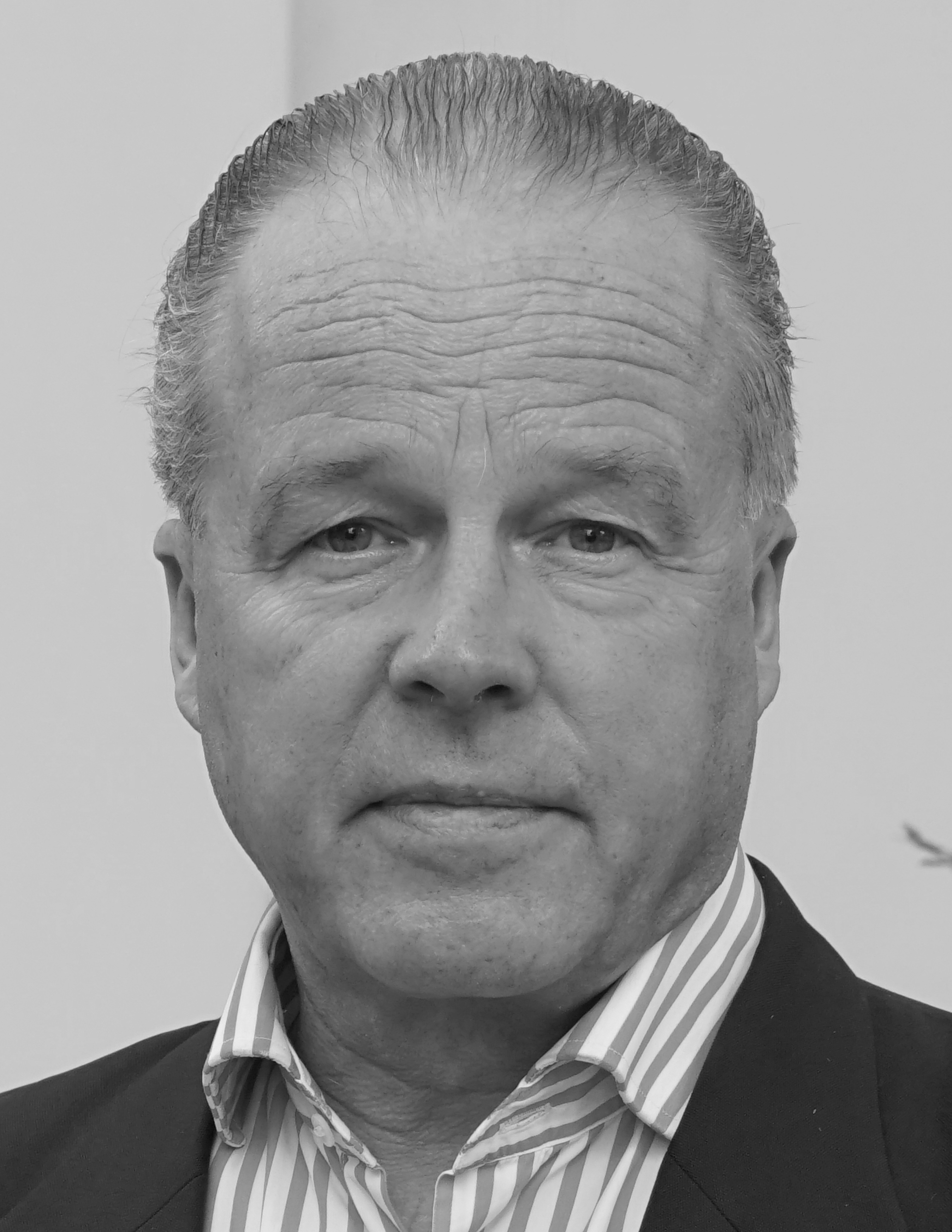
- Fasbender on 22 September 2017
- Born: 13 March 1957 (age 69); Gummersbach, West Germany
- Occupation: Journalist

Thomas Fasbender (born 13 March 1957 in Gummersbach, North Rhine-Westphalia) is a German journalist and author.

== Life ==
Thomas Fasbender studied law and later switched to philosophy. He joined the Corps Borussia Bonn in 1979. In 1986, he completed his PhD at the University of Bayreuth with a thesis on Thomas Carlyle. After a newspaper traineeship in Lower Bavaria, he was promoted to political and economic editor. He worked as press officer for a trade fair company and as assistant to the CEO with an electrical equipment multinational.

For the same company Fasbender moved to Moscow in 1992. He was involved in the restructuring and liquidation of joint ventures founded during Soviet times. As managing director of a Russian subsidiary, he set up local production facilities. In 1999 he became self-employed as partner in a spinning and weaving mill on the Volga. In Moscow, starting 2003, he operated a corporate fleet management company.

In 2015 he returned to Berlin. From 2016 to 2018 he advised the Berlin-based Dialogue of Civilizations Research Institute, a Kremlin-funded project that ceased operation in 2021.

From 2019, in his RT DE 15-minute weekly format Fasbenders Woche, he commented on a wide range of political subjects, at times sarcastically. His talk show format Fasbender im Gespräch presented German-speaking personalities such as Norbert Häring, Roland Koch, Haralampi G. Oroschakoff, Roger Köppel, Hans-Joachim Frey, Maria Zakharova, Georg Pazderski, Tuvia Tenenbom, Dieter Stein, Alexander Neu, Billy Six and others.

His cooperation with RT ended when the EU sanctioned RT following the 2022 Russian invasion of Ukraine. Since 2023, he writes for the daily Berliner Zeitung.

Fasbender wrote a Putin biography that was reviewed in several newspapers, including Wiener Zeitung, Bibliothek des Konservatismus, Berliner Kriminalitätszeitung, Junge Freiheit, and Online Merker.

Fasbender is married and has 5 children.

== Book publications ==
- Das unheimliche Jahrhundert. Vor der Zeitenwende, Manuscriptum Verlagsbuchhandlung, Landt Verlag, 2022, ISBN 978-3948075491
- Wladimir W. Putin. Eine politische Biographie, Manuscriptum Verlagsbuchhandlung, Landt Verlag, 2022, ISBN 978-3948075361
- Die AfD und die Klimafrage, Ed. Konrad Adam, Gerhard Hess Verlag, 2019, ISBN 978-3873366541
- Kinderlieb, Roman, Lichtschlag Reihe Literatur, 2016, ISBN 978-3939562597
- Freiheit statt Demokratie. Russlands Weg und die Illusionen des Westens, Manuscriptum Verlagsbuchhandlung, 2014, ISBN 978-3944872063
- Thomas Carlyle: Idealistische Geschichtssicht und visionäres Heldenideal, Königshausen u. Neumann, 1989, ISBN 978-3884793893
