= Schrenk =

Schrenk (or Schrenck) is a surname. It may refer to:

== Schrenk ==
- Alexander von Schrenk (1816–1876), Baltic-German naturalist; brother of Leopold von Schrenck
- Alois Josef, Freiherr von Schrenk (1802–1849), Roman Catholic archbishop of Prague
- Emmerich Schrenk (1915–1988), Austrian actor
- Karl Schrenk, Austrian football player and manager
- Matthew O. Schrenk, associate professor in geomicrobiology at Michigan State University
- Steve Schrenk (born 1968), U.S. baseball pitcher
- Michael G Schrenk (born 1960), US Software Developer, Publisher, and Intelligence Analyst

== Schrenck ==
- Albert von Schrenck-Notzing (1862–1929), German physician, psychiatrist, and psychic researcher
- Leopold von Schrenck (1826–1894), Russian-born Baltic-German zoologist, geographer, and ethnographer; brother of Alexander von Schrenk
- Sebastian von Schrenck Wenzel Freiherr von Schrenck-Notzing (1774–1848), Roman Catholic Bavarian politician
- Albert von Schrenck-Notzing (1862–1929), German physician, psychiatrist and notable psychical researcher
- Caspar von Schrenck-Notzing (1927–2009), German writer, scholar and publisher
- Gabriele von Schrenck-Notzing (1872–1953), German baroness and 20th-century female aviator
