= Neue Rechte =

German right-wing political movement

Neue Rechte (English: New Right) is the designation for a right-wing political movement in Germany. It was founded as an opposition to the New Left generation of the 1960s. Its intellectually oriented proponents distance themselves from Old Right Nazi traditions and emphasize similarities between the far-right and the conservative spectrum.

A common denominator of the Neue Rechte is a skeptical or negative stance towards the basic tenets of the German constitution, often in the sense of an ethnic (völkisch) nationalism.

== History ==
The term New Right emerged in the Federal Republic of Germany in the 1960s as a self-designation and as a synonym for the "Young Right." When the far-right National Democratic Party of Germany (NPD) was founded in 1964, its younger members began to call themselves Junge Rechte; this was in order to differ from Nazi models and to counter the German student movement. Contrary to their hopes, the NPD failed to enter the Bundestag parliament in the 1969 federal elections, whereafter they initiated a far-right renewal movement. In 1972, Henning Eichberg drafted the policy declaration of the Aktion Neue Rechte offshoot, conveying ideas of an 'anti-imperialistic liberation nationalism', which included the expulsion of the Allied 'occupying forces' to pave the way for German unification and national rebirth.

From 1974, the movement disintegrated into numerous splinter groups, some defending the traditional ideas of a German Volksgemeinschaft, some affiliating to the rising ecology movement. Eichberg and his followers continued to fight an 'over-foreignization' (Überfremdung) by the superpowers and advocated a Third Position in opposition to both capitalism and communism. They made attempts to build up ties to left-wing sectarian and ecological groups, as well as to the German peace movement.

In around 1980, a new tendency arose to approach the ideas of the French Nouvelle Droite and its founder Alain de Benoist. The adherents stressed the perspective of a pan-European 'cultural struggle'; their concepts were embodied by the foundation of the Thule-Seminar as the German branch of the French Groupement de recherche et d'études pour la civilisation européenne (GRECE). In the late 1980s, proponents of a national revolutionary movement attempted to infiltrate right-wing populist parties like The Republicans, while other associated with the national liberal spectrum.

The movement gained a new momentum in the course of German reunification. The rise of right-wing parties as The Republicans led by Franz Schönhuber, the Pro Movement, and the Alternative for Germany (AfD) is a matter of ongoing debate among German political scientists. They draw parallels to the success of European parties such as the Italian Alleanza Nazionale and the Lega Nord, the Freedom Party of Austria (FPÖ), the French Front National, the Swiss People's Party (SVP) or the Belgian Vlaams Belang as well as to the US Tea Party movement. The programmatic statements of 'New Right' parties span from neoliberal to far-right elements and thereby have become compatible to conservative and liberal circles.

== Ideology ==
Historically, the Neue Rechte is linked to the positions of right-wing ideologues in the Weimar Republic, later summarized under the heading 'Conservative Revolution' by writers like Armin Mohler. These forces included such people as Arthur Moeller van den Bruck (Das Dritte Reich), Carl Schmitt, Edgar Julius Jung, Ernst Jünger, Oswald Spengler (The Decline of the West) and Ernst von Salomon. During the interwar period, they openly rejected Marxism as well as liberalism and the parliamentary system in favour of an authoritarian regime and a German Sonderweg. Their views towards rising Nazism remained ambivalent, nevertheless they contributed to the fierce political infighting that preceded the Nazi seizure of power in 1933.

Several members of the Neue Rechte also refer to theorists like Georges Sorel, Vilfredo Pareto, Robert Michels, Julius Evola, and José Antonio Primo de Rivera seen as fascist pioneers. Some even base themselves on Marxist philosophers like Antonio Gramsci and his ideas of cultural hegemony.

Textually, the Neue Rechte challenges the principles of the Enlightenment, such as pluralism and social equality underlying the doctrine of human rights. Racist elements are superseded by the concept of ethnopluralism, combining both neoconservative and far-right approaches. Ideologists disparage the ideals of the 1968 protests and feminism, they refuse to accept a multicultural society and seek for a strengthened 'national identity'. Therefore, they tend to historical revisionism and to battle against what they call a German 'cult of guilt' with regard to the Holocaust. According to Roger Griffin, the Neue Rechte share the deep cultural pessimism of their precursors in the interwar period. Referring to a völkisch nationalism, the movement seeks refuge not in the restoration of traditional values, but in a 'national rebirth' according to palingenetic concepts.

They parallel the French Nouvelle Droite as a political movement, somewhat similar in their general political stance including the Anti-American sentiment advocated by Alain de Benoist. However, the Nouvelle Droite's neo-pagan leanings are the opposite to the Christian foundation of many Neue Rechte members, though the movement also comprises occult groups.

Although the European Neue Rechte refrains from political violence, according to Roger Griffin it "clearly embodies a form of palingenetic ultranationalism and has earned the label 'fascist'". Aware that no more mass political movements can be formed after 1945, the Neue Rechte, according to Griffin, is deliberately moving "into a state of apoliteia beyond party politics, stoically awaiting a new historical conjuncture in which the postponed revolution can be resumed". The militant anti-Americanism of Alain de Benoist, for example, explicitly justifies attacks ("retaliatory measures") on the USA. According to Griffin, the Ordine Nuovo, which is responsible for several terrorist attacks, draws its main inspiration from the works of Julius Evola.

According to Volker Weiß, there is hardly any fundamental hostility towards Islam within the Neue Rechte. The reason for the aversion is "merely the presence of Islam in the greater European area". The "real conditions in Teheran, Riyadh, Istanbul or Kabul" play no role for the representatives of the New Right - unlike in universalist thinking.

According to Griffin, the preferred target groups of the New Right's "culture war" are segments of society in which young people who have a certain tolerance for Neue Rechte positions can be found, e.g. fraternities and displaced persons. Other fields of agitation are neo-paganism and occultism. The Dark culture was also courted in the 1990s. The main starting point for this was Neofolk, a style of music in which some artists operate with fascist aesthetics. In addition to musical reviews, the fanzine Sigill (later Zinnober) also published essays on the work of Armin Mohler, Ernst Jünger, Julius Evola and others.

Some Neue Rechte groups refer to pre-Christian or non-Christian European traditions. According to Friedrich Paul Heller, neopaganism is "one of their founding figures, and they practice the corresponding cults with devotion". The Thule-Seminar, for example, sees a "European rebirth". According to Heller, it is not the number of members that is decisive here, but their role as cues. They had an impact on the music scene and esotericism.

The historian Walter Laqueur is of the opinion that the Neue Rechte ultimately failed to develop a coherent counter-position to Western-American liberalism. The Neue Rechte movement has not achieved an integrated opposite position to Western liberalism: while a main neoconservative tendency strongly refers to pre-war traditions and even affect centre-right parties, a second wing openly uses terms like "revolution" or "socialism" in political disputes, based on the model of Ernst Niekisch and Strasserist concepts. They have made attempts to build up a Querfront strategy with originally 'left' anti-imperialist and anti-capitalist circles.

== Theoretical foundations ==
=== First representatives ===
Representatives of the German New Right often refer to certain thinkers of the Weimar Republic. Since a dissertation by Armin Mohler in 1949, these have been summarized in the collective term "Conservative Revolution", which many on the New Right have taken up and updated. Mohler's dissertation is still considered a standard work by supporters of the New Right. Representatives of this movement include thinkers who rejected human rights, liberalism, Marxism and parliamentary democracy between the world wars, such as Arthur Moeller van den Bruck, Ernst Jünger, Edgar Julius Jung, Ernst von Salomon, and Carl Schmitt. Their opposing positions were inconsistent, but tended towards authoritarian state models and a German "special path" in relation to Western civilization. Their relationship to National Socialism is controversial; most of them were not active National Socialists, some distanced themselves from them and some were persecuted after 1933, while others affirmed and supported the Nazi state. Historians such as Kurt Sontheimer emphasize the ideological and practical similarities, which favoured and helped prepare the rise of the NSDAP.

The New Right also refers to pioneers and theorists of fascism such as Julius Evola, Robert Michels, Vilfredo Pareto, José Antonio Primo de Rivera und Georges Sorel. The weekly newspaper Junge Freiheit, which historians and political scientists classify as an organ of the New Right, has dedicated a series of articles to these and similar thinkers and regularly reviews books about them.

=== Gramscianism ===
The New Right not only refers to representatives of the "Conservative Revolution", but also to a Marxist intellectual, Antonio Gramsci. His ideas on the achievement of cultural hegemony are used instrumentally as power techniques – without further consideration of his Marxist ideas and ideals.

The reference to Gramsci was presented by Alain de Benoist in a fundamental article in the GRECE magazine Elements in 1977 titled "Pour un 'gramscisme de droite'" ["For a right-wing 'Gramscism'"], which was finally adopted as part of a new-right strategy at a GRECE conference in Paris in November 1981. This reference was intended to bring about self-sanctioning and was aimed at the appropriation of recognition by recognized intellectuals in order to bring about social acceptance. However, this reference was also a symbolic attribute, according to historian Wolfgang Kowalsky, "which made it possible to break the anti-fascist consensus that had assigned every right-wing extremist position since 1945 a socio-political place 'hors statut' [out of status], in other words: stigmatized it".

As there are currently no historical conditions, such as a mass movement, for a desired turnaround, the most important tactical approach of the New Right is the claim to achieve "discourse sovereignty" in social debates and cultural hegemony. This principle was first described by the Marxist theorist of the Italian Communist Party, Antonio Gramsci. He analyzed that social hegemony also functions in this way in the existing system: If one wants to achieve such hegemony, one must strive to infiltrate the elite discourse through journalistic activities, participate in clubs, associations and cultural institutions and on this basis bring ideological content into the social discussion, ultimately creating acceptance for it and dominating public opinion in the long term. Once this goal has been achieved, society is "ripe" for an overthrow of the status quo through an increasing number of electoral shares and parliamentary seats until government responsibility is assumed. This strategy also appears interesting to the New Right: "It is generally regarded as an essential new element of the 'New Right' that it refers to the Italian communist Antonio Gramsci and strives to achieve 'cultural hegemony' in order to overturn political conditions on this basis".

== Networks ==
Well-known scholars and influential figures of the Neue Rechte beside Henning Eichberg and Armin Mohler include Gerd-Klaus Kaltenbrunner, Hans-Dietrich Sander, Robert Hepp, Caspar von Schrenck-Notzing, Karlheinz Weissmann and Götz Kubitschek.

The medium commonly associated with the Neue Rechte is the weekly newspaper Junge Freiheit founded in 1986. However, its chief editor Dieter Stein, a former member of The Republicans, denounces the term and instead advocates a more traditionally Christian, yet decidedly nationalist and democratic conservatism. Yet the term is frequently used as a self-description by the bi-monthly magazine Sezession, which is closely linked to Junge Freiheit. Other periodicals affiliated with the Neue Rechte are Nation und Europa (discontinued in 2009) and its Zuerst! successor. The Studienzentrum Weikersheim founded by the CDU politician Hans Filbinger considers itself a Christian-conservative think tank.

The Bibliothek des Konservatismus (BdK) is another connecting element in the network of the far-right in central Europe. Opened in 2012 and located in Fasanenstraße in Berlin-Charlottenburg, the main focus of the library is conservative and far-right literature. It is the first library with this content in Germany and was founded by Caspar von Schrenck-Notzing and his foundation Förderstiftung Konservative Bildung und Forschung (FKBF), which continues to administer it. As of 2014 there were 27,000 items in the library.
