= Kaltenbrunner (surname) =

Kaltenbrunner is a German surname. Notable people with the surname include:

- Ernst Kaltenbrunner (1903–1946), Austrian-born senior SS official of Nazi Germany, executed for war crimes
- Ernst Kaltenbrunner (footballer) (1937–1967), Austrian footballer
- Gerd-Klaus Kaltenbrunner (1939–2011), Austrian writer and publisher
- Gerlinde Kaltenbrunner (born 1970), Austrian mountaineer
- Günter Kaltenbrunner (born 1943), Austrian footballer
- Josef Kaltenbrunner (1888–1951), Austrian footballer
