= Bibliothek des Konservatismus =

Specialized scientific library of right-wing non-fiction literature in Berlin, Germany

Library of Conservatism
- Bibliothek des Konservatismus
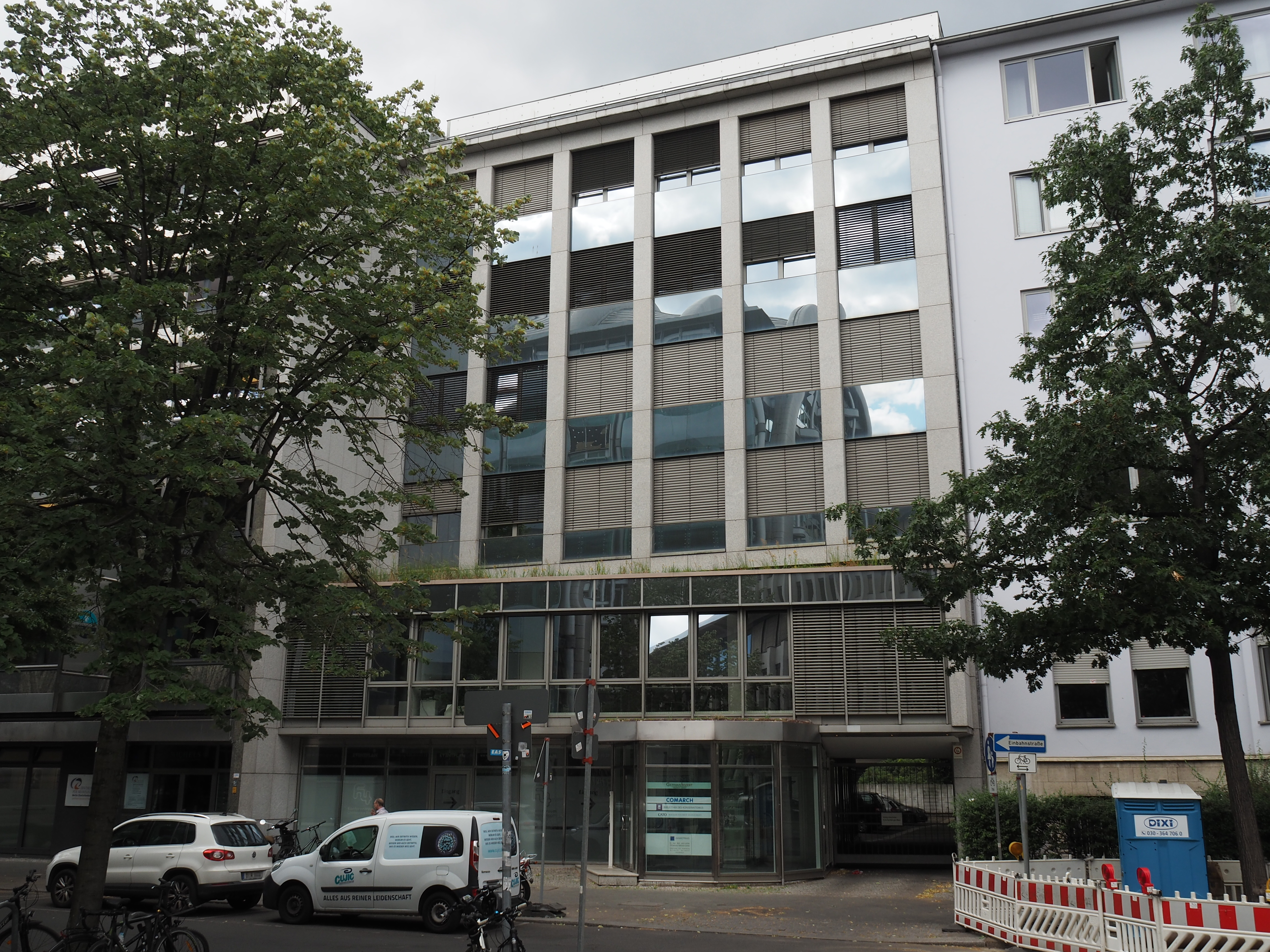
- 52°30′26.5″N 13°19′40.1″E
- Location: Berlin, Germany, Germany
- Type: Special library
- Established: 25 December 2012; 13 years ago

Collection
- Size: 35,000

Other information
- Director: Wolfgang Fenske
- Employees: 4
- Parent organisation: Foundation for Conservative Education and Research (FKBF)
- Affiliation: GBV until 2025
- Website: www.bdk-berlin.org

The Library of Conservatism (German: Bibliothek des Konservatismus, BdK) is a specialized scientific library and think tank in Berlin. Its focus is non-fiction literature by conservative, right-wing and libertarian authors from the 18th to the early 21st century. The principal foundation for the library was laid by the writer and publicist Caspar von Schrenck-Notzing who gave his extensive private collection of books. The BdK opened in 2012 in Berlin. So far, its catalogued stock comprises around 35,000 items. The library is financed and supported by the Foundation for Conservative Education and Research (Förderstiftung Konservative Bildung und Forschung, FKBF); director is Wolfgang Fenske.

The library and the FKBF are part of the right-wing extremist movement of so called "Neue Rechte".

The major Common Library Network (GBV) of the northern German federal states terminated its contract with BdK effective December 31, 2025, because BdK library staff had repeatedly engaged in data manipulation, deletions, and the insertion of political commentary into the network's shared catalog records.

== Establishment ==
The writer and publicist Caspar von Schrenck-Notizing (1927–2009) was the scion of an old Bavarian family and a bestselling author and conservative critique in post-war Germany, who founded the bimonthly journal "Criticón" in 1970 that became a focal point for conservative and right-wing intellectuals in the Federal Republic of Germany.

In 2000, he established the Foundation for Conservative Education and Research (FKBF) in Munich to preserve his private library of around 20,000 books. Since 2007, Dieter Stein, the editor of weekly newspaper Junge Freiheit, is the chairman of the foundation. In 2012, the library opened to the public in Berlin. In addition to Schrenck-Notizing's collection it received as a bequest the library of the conservative social philosopher Günter Rohrmoser of Stuttgart University (around 10,000 books) and further donations.

The FKBF owns a modern building in Berlin that was a gift by the shipowner and entrepreneur Folkard Edler from Hamburg. The building is opposite of the Universität der Künste (Berlin University of the Arts) in Charlottenburg.

The director of the library is Wolfgang Fenske, a doctor of Protestant theology and former pastor. In an interview with Hessische Rundfunk (Public Broadcasting Corporation of Hesse), Fenske said that he was drawn into conservative thinking by his opposition to his school teachers of the generation of 1968. In a talk with public radio Deutschlandfunk, Fenske maintained that even modern conservative thinking is rooted in ancient and Christian natural rights philosophy.

== Holdings ==
At the time of opening, the BdK held about 60,000 titles, now they claim to own more than 136,000 items, mainly books, but also 500 journals and political posters since 1848 as well as graphics. Around a quarter of their stock (34,000 items) are catalogued. The main body of writings is from conservative and right-wing authors since 1789 until the early 21st century. Among the books there are works (often early prints) of British writers from Edmund Burke to Roger Scruton, French personalities from Richelieu to Louis-Ferdinand Céline, conservative Germans from the arts and letters like Richard Wagner, Stefan George, philosopher Johann Gottlieb Fichte and conservative politician Otto von Bismarck as well as authors from the movement of the "Conservative Revolution" of the interwar period like Arthur Moeller van den Bruck, Ernst Jünger, Carl Schmitt, Oswald Spengler and also Thomas Mann. This was a focus of the collection of Schrenck-Notzing and his collaborator at Criticón Armin Mohler. The library owns mainly works of political science, history, sociology, arts and some on economics. In 2012, the BdK also acquired a large collection of several thousand books and pamphlets of the German Pro Life movement.

The library is a member of the Association of German Libraries (Deutscher Bibliotheksverband). This has drawn criticism from left wing organizations who called the library a "hard right" institution. Among the critics in 2013 were student representatives of Technische Universität Berlin and the head of the Berlin Young Socialists (Jusos), Kevin Kühnert, now a vice chairman of the German Social Democrats SPD.

== Other activities ==
Besides providing access to a large body of non-fiction literature, the BdK also is considered as a think tank of the modern conservative and right-wing movement in Germany. Every one or two weeks the foundation holds talks and seminars in the rooms of the library in central Berlin (Charlottenburg, near the Bahnhof Zoo train station). They had speakers and guest from European universities, journalists but also right-wing politicians mainly from the Christian Democrats and the Alternative for Germany. The head of the antifascist association Apabiz called the library a "showcase project of the New Right" and criticized that CDU politicians had no inhibitions to meet and talk there.

== Data manipulation and library network exclusion ==
In November 2025, it was reported that the library would be excluded from Joint Library Network (GBV). The BdK and its supporters argued, among other things in an open letter from the Science Freedom Network, that the dismissal was purely politically motivated. Director Wolfgang Fenske stated he believed the exclusion was based on ideology and that he would sue to prevent it.

It was only through the legal dispute initiated by the BdK that it became public, which is why it was removed from the GBV: BdK library staff had repeatedly engaged in data manipulation, deletions, and the insertion of political commentary into the network's shared catalog records. The GBV writes that reports were made from various of its libraries and that in spring 2025 it became clear that the Library of Conservatism (BdK) is largely responsible for data manipulation in the joint catalogue. "It quickly became obvious that these manipulations were carried out deliberately, systematically and on a significant scale." GBV had asked than BdK to stop the manipulation via an own intranet system, but BdK continued to manipulate datasets from other libraries. GBV stated that in its history no library had made such manipulations.

The procedure massively jeopardized the integrity of the data in the catalog – and thus the library work of all libraries in the network - and was therefore intolerable, said GBV. Users should be able to rely on the quality of the libraries. Given the severity and nature of the data manipulation, the management of the GBV decided to terminate the contract with BdK.

In May 2025, two Alliance 90/The Greens members of the Berlin House of Representatives submitted an inquiry regarding the library's affiliation with a local library network in Berlin.

The exclusion was legally confirmed as lawful in spring 2026 by the Higher Regional Court of Braunschweig and the Regional Court of Göttingen.
