= Hedda Eulenberg =

German translator and writer (1876–1960)

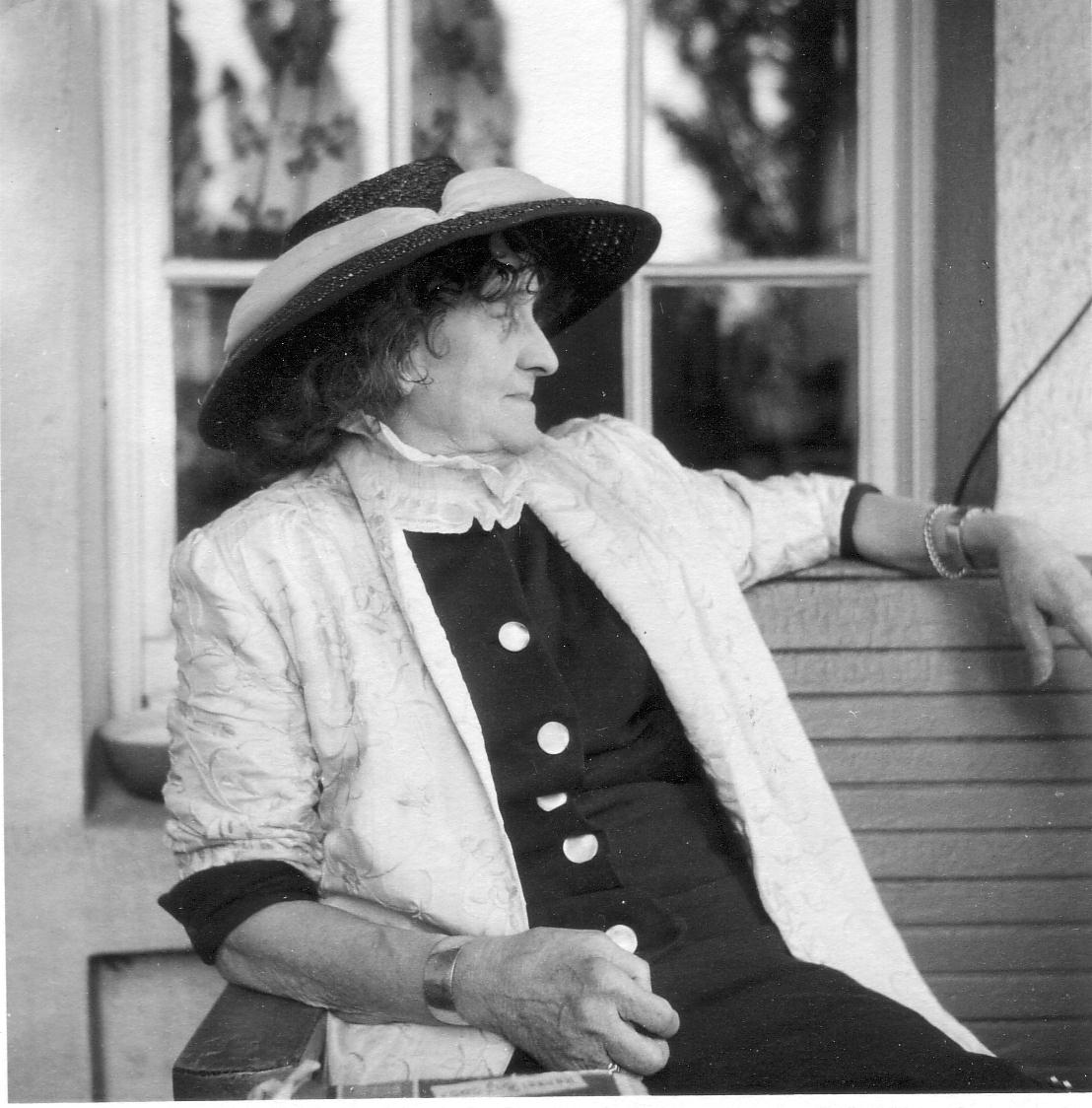
- Eulenberg in 1955
- Born: Hedwig Maase; 6 March 1876; Meiderich, Rhine Province, German Empire
- Died: 13 September 1960 (aged 84); Düsseldorf-Kaiserswerth, West Germany
- Occupations: translator, essayist
- Writing career
- Period: 1898–1960
- Genres: Novel, publications in literal newspapers
- Notable works: translation of Edgar Allan Poe's works and Germinal by Émile Zola, Im Doppelglück von Kunst und Leben,

Hedda Eulenberg (6 March 1876 – 13 September 1960) was a German translator and writer.

== Early life and education ==
Eulenberg was born in Meiderich (today part of Duisburg) in Prussian Rhine Province, the daughter of Wilhelm Maase, a music director. She passed her school-leaving exam (Abitur) in 1893 at the Luisenschule in Düsseldorf. In 1897, she married the author Arthur Moeller van den Bruck in Berlin, whom she had known since her days at school in Düsseldorf. 1901, she met the writer Herbert Eulenberg in Berlin at the premiere of his play Muenchhausen. The same year, Arthur Moeller van den Bruck fled to France for political and economical reasons.

== Career ==
In 1901, Max Bruns published her ten volumes of the translations of Edgar Allan Poe's works, followed by the translation of Jeanne Marni's novel La Femme de Silva (Die Gattin) issued by Julius Bard the next year. In 1903, Reclam published her German translation of Germinal by Émile Zola.

In 1904, Hedda divorced from Arthur Moeller van den Bruck and married Herbert Eulenberg. In 1905, they moved to Kaiserswerth near Düsseldorf, where Eulenberg worked as a dramaturge at the Schauspielhaus theatre under director Louise Dumont. At her new home, she began her first translations of Guy de Maupassant, Charles Dickens and further works by Émile Zola. Until 1936, numerous German translations were published by Max Bruns, Reclam, Nymphenburger Verlag (Munich), and other publishing houses. At the same time, she published numerous newspaper articles, mostly about Monism.

=== Nazi persecution ===
In 1936, the Nazi authorities started persecution of Hedda and Herbert Eulenberg to destroy their economical and intellectual existence. While several members of her family were arrested in concentration camps, Hedda could no longer find a German publisher who was prepared to publish her works.

== Later life and death ==
After 1945, she began to pick up her work again, which she had to stop in 1936. In 1952, her autobiography Im Doppelglück von Kunst und Leben was published. In 1956, she returned to her translations of Henri Troyat, Yvette Guilbert, and Thomas Burke, all published by Heinrich Droste in Düsseldorf. On 13 September 1960, she died in Kaiserswerth in her Haus Freiheit ('House of Freedom') residence.

== Literary works ==
- Im Doppelglück von Kunst und Leben. Düsseldorf: Die Faehre, [1952].
- Abgesang. Düsseldorf: Die Faehre, [1952]
