= Caspar von Schrenck-Notzing =

German writer, scholar and publisher

Caspar Freiherr von Schrenck-Notzing (23 June 1927 – 25 January 2009) was a German writer, scholar and publisher. He was a leading thinker of the post-war political right in Germany. He is associated with the German New Right.

== Life ==
Schrenck-Notzing was born in 1927 in the Bavarian capital Munich. He was a descendant of one of the oldest patrician and noble families of the city. Among his ancestors were the physical researcher and spiritist Albert von Schrenck-Notzing, his grandfather, and the female aviation pioneer Gabriele von Schrenck-Notzing, his grandmother. He later in life inherited from his father a considerable fortune and became a major shareholder in the companies WMF Group (tableware manufacturer) and BASF, the chemical manufacturer.

After his Abitur exam at the Gymnasium, Schrenck-Notzing studied history and sociology at the Ludwig-Maximilians-Universität München, the University of Freiburg, and the University of Cologne in the years after the war. While a student, he began to publish articles in conservative and right-wing newspapers. His first major book publication was a history of India Hundert Jahre Indien (One hundred years of India) in 1961.

Schrenck-Notzing became nationally renowned in Germany for his 1965 book, Charakterwäsche (Character washing), a scathing critique of the Allied process of "re-education" after World War II and especially their licensing system that in his opinion favored left wing newspaper editors. The book was reprinted in many editions and met with appraisal in right wing and conservative circles. Mainstream critics call it an example of anti-American post-war literature. Although critical of U.S. influence in Germany, Schrenck-Notzing paid close attention to intellectual debates in America, in particular paleo-conservative, but also classical liberal and libertarian thinkers. He also put some hope in a European "Conservative International" alliance in the form of CEDI (European Documentation and Information Centre). He also occasionally published in Der Monat, a monthly journal led by Melvin Lasky.

In 1970, Schrenck-Notzing established his own, bimonthly magazine called "Criticón" together with the right-wing publicist Armin Mohler that became a focal point for intellectuals from the right wing of the Christian Democratic Union of Germany and non-party affiliated conservative thinkers. Among the contributors of "Criticón" were CDU politician Alexander Gauland, political scientist Klaus Hornung, CSU politician Hans Graf Huyn, Austrian writer Erik von Kuehnelt-Leddihn, social philosopher Günter Rohrmoser, Catholic philosopher Robert Spaemann, General and military historian Franz Uhle-Wettler and the historian Karlheinz Weißmann. Schrenck-Notzing stayed at the helm of the journal until 1998 when he gave up the editorship, the paper ceased publication in 2007. In 1996, he published as the editor an "Encyclopedia of Conservatism" (Lexikon des Konservatismus).

He donated his private library of more than 20,000 volumes to the Förderstiftung Konservative Bildung und Forschung (Foundation for Conservative Education and Research) which has since then established the Library of Conservatism (Bibliothek des Konservatismus) in Berlin.

When he died in 2009, Herbert Kremp, the former editor-in-chief of the daily Die Welt, wrote that Schrenck-Notzing was a "conservative literary man who could in the United States or in Great Britain have been a well respected critic of his times who would have been printed everywhere. In the Germany, even in Bavaria, that counted as a taboo breaker". The U.S. paleo-conservative political philosopher Paul Gottfried wrote an obituary in Modern Age and called him "one of the most insightful German political thinkers of his generation".

== Publications ==
- Hundert Jahre Indien. Kohlhammer, Stuttgart 1961.
- Charakterwäsche. Die amerikanische Besatzung in Deutschland und ihre Folgen. Seewald, Stuttgart 1965 (diverse new editions).
- Zukunftsmacher. Die Neue Linke in Deutschland und ihre Herkunft. Seewald, Stuttgart 1968.
- Demokratisierung. Konfrontation mit der Wirklichkeit. Langen Müller, Munich, Vienna 1972.
- Honoratiorendämmerung. Das Versagen der Mitte, Bilanz und Alternative. Seewald, Stuttgart 1973
- (as editor): Konservative Köpfe. Von Machiavelli bis Solschenizyn. Criticon-Verlag, Munich 1978.
- (as editor): Lexikon des Konservatismus. Stocker, Graz 1996.
- (as editor): Stand und Probleme der Erforschung des Konservatismus. Duncker & Humblot, Berlin 2000.
- Konservative Publizistik. Texte aus den Jahren 1961 bis 2008. FKBF, Berlin 2011.
