= Karlheinz Weißmann =

German author and historian

Karlheinz Weißmann (born 1959 in Northeim, West Germany) is a German historian, author and intellectual of the New Right (Neue Rechte). He is co-founder and publisher of New Right magazine "Cato".

== Life ==
Weißmann studied Protestant theology, pedagogics and history at the University of Gottingen and at the Technical University in Braunschweig. In Gottingen and Braunschweig he became member of the Hochschulgilden of Deutsche Gildenschaft. In 1989 graduated with a Ph.D. from the history department in Braunschweig. Subsequently, he worked as a high school teacher from 1984 until 2020 at a Gymnasium in Northeim, Lower Saxony.

== Activism, publications and journalism ==
Weißmann has published more than twenty books on historical and political subject. Some of his books deal with German and European political and intellectual history in the 19th and 20th century, notably the „Conservative Revolution“ movement during the Weimar Republic and National Socialism and related movements. Lately, he has published a book on Martin Luther and a book on what he described as "culture war" since 1968.

In 1994 he took part in a debate with leading conservative German intellectuals under the motto “What’s right?” in the Frankfurter Allgemeine Zeitung. Weißmann’s contribution was entitled “Die Nation denken” (Thinking the Nation) with a subtitle “We are no conspirators”. In the same year he was one of the authors of the book “Die selbstbewußte Nation” (The Selfconscious Nation) which triggered a national debate in Germany. Since the 1990s he is considered one of the leading, however controversial right-wing authors. He has long sought to help establish a political movement to the right of the Christian Democrats (CDU).

Karlheinz Weißmann and Götz Kubitschek founded the think tank "Institut für Staatspolitik" in 2000. Later he got odds to Kubitschek about the question, "how revisionistic and how reactionary to be" (Süddeutsche Zeitung). Weißmann is a writer for newspaper and journals of the political far-right, mainly the weekly Junge Freiheit. In 2017 he was co-founder of the bimonthly journal Cato, an outcast of Junge Freiheit.

He is member of the advisory board of the Desiderius Erasmus Stiftung, a foundation associated with the Alternative for Germany party.

== Reception ==
The left liberal daily newspaper Die Tageszeitung has called Weißmann in 2017 disparagingly “The Uber-Intellectual” of the German right.
