= Dieter Stein =

German journalist, writer and publisher

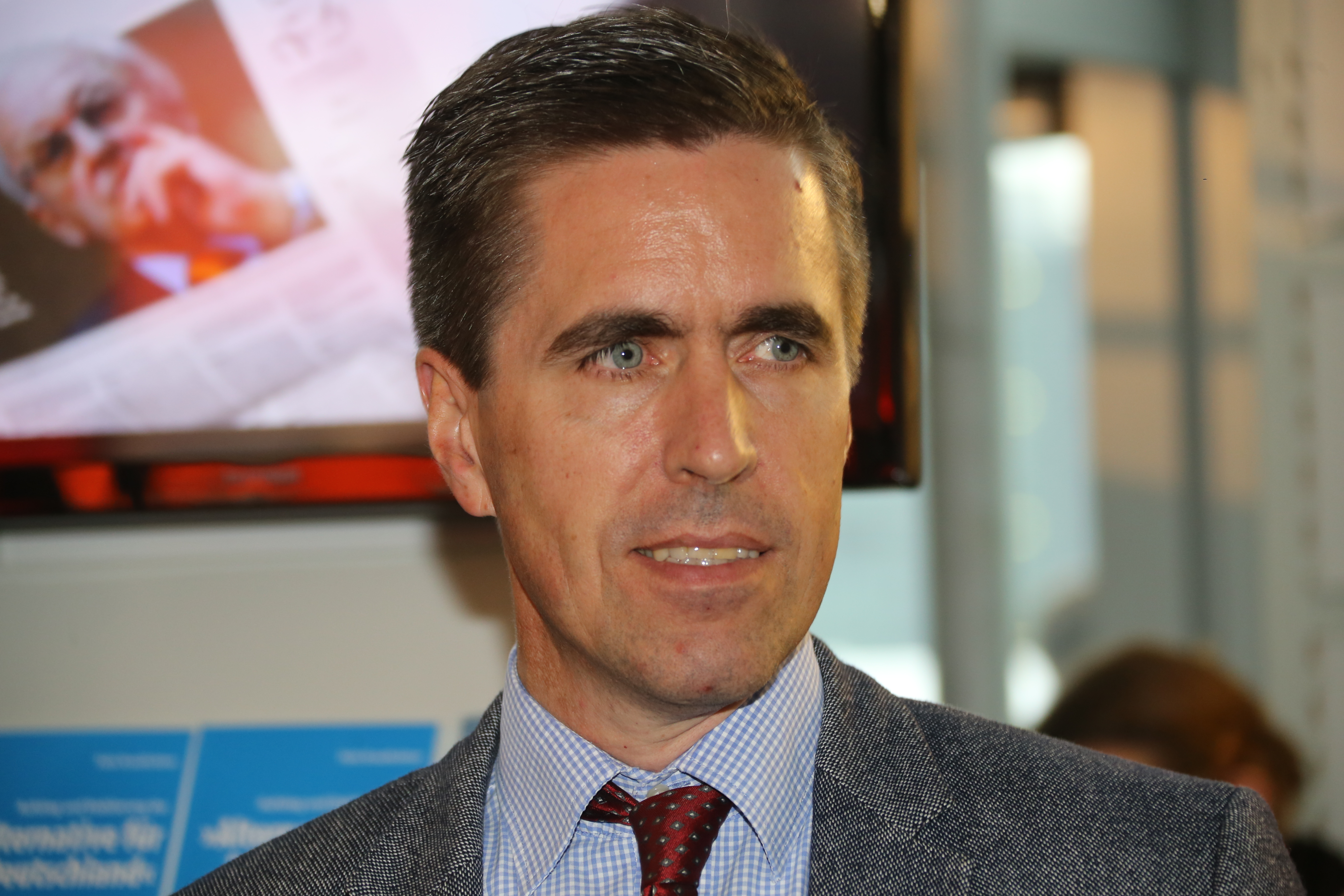
Stein

Dieter Stein (born 15th June 1967 in Ingolstadt) is a German journalist, publisher, editor-in-chief and founder of the right wing newspaper Junge Freiheit. He is associated with the German New Right.

Stein grew up in Bavaria and Baden-Württemberg and studied political science and history at Albert Ludwigs University of Freiburg from 1989 to 1993. In 1986, Stein founded the Junge Freiheit as a reaction to the "dominance of the leftist '68 generation". In 1990, Stein founded the Junge Freiheit Verlag GmbH, a publisher for his newspaper. He became the CEO of the company. The newspaper has been published in Berlin since 1994. Junge Freiheit is now the largest explicitly conservative weekly in Germany. An analysis by German press agency dpa, which was published in Die Welt called the paper "the ideological mothership" of right-wing populism in the country.

Since 2007, Stein has been the chairman of the Foundation for Conservative Education and Research (Förderstiftung Konservative Bildung und Forschung, FKBF), a research foundation that has set up the Bibliothek des Konservatismus, Germany's largest library of literature by conservative, right-wing and libertarian authors from the 18th to the 21st century with more than 30.000 publications in their catalogue stock.

Stein is married and has 4 children.

== Works ==
- Dieter Stein: Phantom 'Neue Rechte' - Die Geschichte eines politischen Begriffs und sein Mißbrauch durch den Verfassungsschutz. Berlin, 2005. ISBN 978-3-929886-22-1
- Dieter Stein (ed.): Rettet die deutsche Sprache. Beiträge, Interviews und Materialien zum Kampf gegen Rechtschreibreform und Anglizismen. Berlin, Oktober 2004. ISBN 978-3-929886-21-4
- Dieter Stein: Für eine neue Nation. Nachdenken über Deutschland. Edition JF, Berlin 2014, ISBN 978-3-929886-43-6
