= Haralampi G. Oroschakoff =

Austrian painter

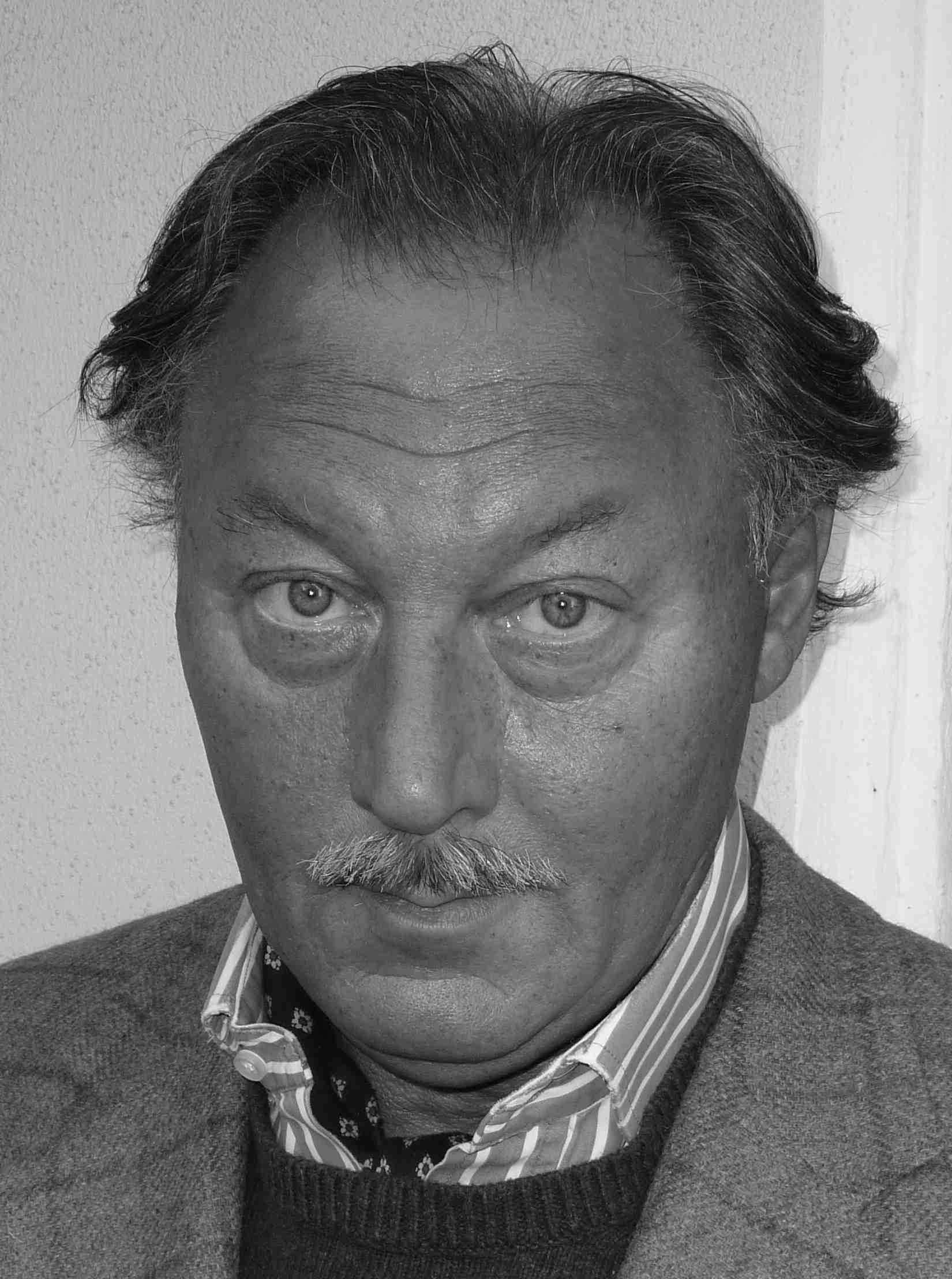
Haralampi G. Oroschakoff (2017)

Haralampi G. Oroschakoff (Russian: Харлампий Г. Орешаков; * May 23, 1955 in Sofia) is an Austrian painter, writer and publisher. He is considered a pioneer of the East-West dialogue in art and a reviver of the reception of Eastern iconography in Western painting. Oroschakoff participated in TEDxLambeth 2019 as a speaker regarding the subject matter of conceptualism.

== Life ==
Oroschakoff is the son of the engineer and entrepreneur Georgij H. Oroschakoff, a descendant of the exiled Russian noble family Haralamow-Oreschak, and his spouse, the lawyer Welika Ugrin-Gudarowska, a member of the Ugrin-Csák family. TEDxLambeth 2019, he acknowledged being the son of a "refuge" as well as an unlikely "misfit". In 1960, Oroschakoff and his parents escaped Bulgaria via Belgrade to Vienna. He received Austrian citizenship in 1961. Later his father founded the Austrian industrial enterprises Oroschakoff-Tor-Stahl Ges.m.b.H. and B.V.B. Ges.m.b.H.

Having changed school several times, Oroschakoff completed his secondary education in 1973. He spent three months with Rudolf Hausner as guest auditor at the Academy of Fine Arts Vienna, then continued as autodidact, dividing his time between Cannes, New York City, Geneva and Cologne. In 1981 he traveled to Patmos and Mount Athos. That year he received the Project Award of the City of Vienna and the Recognition Award for Fine Arts of the State of Lower Austria. In 1983 he moved to Munich.

"I wanted to strangle that city. That same Munich, trapped in its smug beauty and dulled by navel-gazing, where, at the beginning of the 20th century, Wassily Kandinsky, Alexej von Jawlensky and the Dalmatian Greek and self-made Italian Giorgio de Chirico lead the first battles for a modern conception of values and the world – and at the end of a century, in which we were turned into emigrants, shoved back and forth like furniture in abandoned rooms."

In 1987, he received the Scholarship for Fine Arts of the City of Munich and in 1991 the Schwabing Art Prize. Right after the end of the Cold War, about 1990, he began to travel the countries of his ancestors: Serbia, Bulgaria, Russia, Slovenia, and Kazakhstan. Since 1998, he has been living and working in Berlin, Cannes and Vienna since 1998. He married Diana Gräfin von Hohenthal und Bergen in 2000. Before, from 1986 to 2000, he was married to Johanna Gräfin von und zu Eltz, gen. Faust von Stromberg. He fathered four children, Kalina Oroschakoff (* November 21, 1986), Georgi Oroschakoff (* February 27, 1989), Dara Militza Oroschakoff (* March 5, 2000) und Gawriil Oroschakoff (* April 8, 2003).

== Artistic work ==
During the 1980s, Oroschakoff produced drawings, text collages, installations and video performances "that are more than mere creations of aesthetic values. Oroschakoff is on the way to a Gesamtkunstwerk (...), a universal world view, integrally reflecting the categories of nature, artifact, and the humane." His early works were influenced by his Viennese past: changing schools, speechlessness and isolation, simultaneously the material and social ascent of his family. They revolved around issues of aesthetics and identity, the relationship between individuum and collective, and communication mirrored by consumption. "Oroschakoff reveals our anxiety and fear (...), our refusal of self-awareness, our insecurity about our place of work as well as about our precise localization. (...) Oroschakoff visualizes what sociologists and historians are just beginning to explore: Siberia or the loneliness within us all."

=== The Patriarchal cross and Eastern Europe ===
From the mid-1980s, Oroschakoff returned to his Byzantine Orthodox roots. This led to a focus on the Orthodox cross – the patriarchal (or double) cross. It resulted in a series of pictures with an independent approach to the development of monochrome painting, denoting the invisible cultural boundary between the post-Latin West and the post-Byzantine East. "His deliberate and positive inclusion of diverse fragments from the Slavic-Russian and Asia Minor realms and the attempt to develop a new and contemporary iconography clearly show that Oroschakoff's intention is to shift the emphasis – not for sentimental love of his roots, but for his belief that the East has preserved a cultural vitality which has long been buried in the West."

The fall of the Berlin Wall in 1989 was followed by yet another change in perspective. The physical encounter broadened the hitherto theoretical confrontation with the art and culture of Eastern Europe. Friendship developed with representatives of the local avant-garde of the time, such as Boris Groys, IRWIN, Andrei Filippov, Yuri Albert, Vadim Zahkarov and Luchezar Boyadjiev. Curatorial projects and lectures consolidated Oroschakoff's reputation as expert in the East-West art dialogue: Kräftemessen (Munich 1994) with Margarita Tupitsyn, Boris Groys and Viktor Misiano; Bulgariaavantgarde (Munich 1998) with Iara Boubnova; 4th Internationale (Almaty 1998) with Yerbossyn Meldibekov and Kanat Ibragimov.

In 2003, Oroschakoff bequeathed his collection of works by Moscow Conceptualists of the 1980s and 1990s, the result of a long-standing interaction with the perestroika avant-garde, to the Kupferstichkabinett Berlin. Since 2008, he has been working on his Gesamtkunstwerk "Musée d'Art et de Lettre", a search for traces reaching back, conceptually, to 1979 joining together diverse means of expression, techniques and materials in order to create an experiential space.

=== Theory, literature and politics ===
Against the backdrop of East-West rapprochement and subsequent estrangement, Oroschakoff has been engaging as publisher and publicist, e.g., with Kräftemessen and Instant Archaeology. Beyond his immediate artistic commitment, he follows the socio-cultural and geostrategic development. Thus, besides drawing and painting, the archiving and juxtaposition of self-conception and behavioral patterns in East and West form an integral part of his work.

In his non-fiction book Die Battenberg Affäre (Bloomsbury 2007), Oroschakoff creates a historical panorama of cultural struggle, connecting historical events of the 19th century. Subject is the Eastern Question. It "is (...) the history of Europe in the Southeast of the continent that follows the collapse and demise of the Ottoman Empire."

Since the turn of the century, Oroschakoff has been participating in political discussions around Russia, the Balkans and the Caucasus. He regularly publishes essays and commentaries in Lettre International, Russlandkontrovers, etc.

== Reception ==
The early installation Dandolo (Museum Fridericianum in Kassel 1989; Kunstverein Göttingen in 1989; Staatsgalerie Moderne Kunst in Munich 1990), which dealt with the destruction of Constantinople by the crusaders, caused a big controversy in the German art scene. Curator Justin Hoffmann called Oroschakoff a "Belarusian revanchist". The Süddeutsche Zeitung wrote: "Oroschakoff, the conservative, affirms the absoluteness of his beliefs and places it in the traditional canon of the aesthetically beautiful." The installation found a more positive response in the Frankfurter Allgemeine Zeitung: "Oroschakoff – and this makes him a role model for many whose cultural identity has been dramatically upset by the opening of the Eastern bloc – has learned how to own up to his ambivalence."

Elke Schmitter wrote about Oroschakoff in Der Spiegel in 2002: "(...) the image of the angry young man, exotically enhanced by ostentatious dandyism and foreign origin. (...) Nowhere at home without questioning, his perception of cultural loss of memory is pronounced and his sensibility for opposites is heightened." In 2018, in the bi-monthly magazine CATO, Thomas Fasbender stated: „Unlike Kazimir Malevich, who attacked head-on, complemented and overcame modern thought with the monochrome square, Oroschakoff, in the patriarchal cross, leaves it behind like a dog that barks as the caravan moves on and into the beyond."

The writer Martin Mosebach described him as an "orthodox painter and unorthodox historian."

== Exhibitions ==
Since 1981, Oroschakoff has been participating at exhibitions, conferences and lectures in Europe, Russia and the United States. Examples: Venice Biennale 1988; documenta IX in 1992; Moscow Biennale 1998; São Paulo Art Biennial 2002; Bienal del Fin del Mundo, Mar del Plata in 2014/15.

== Publications (selection) ==
- 2016 "Oroschakoff Doppelkreuz", Monographie, Hatje Cantz, Berlin
- 2013 "Wenn sie nicht elegant sind, dann bemühen sie sich um eine eigene Note" in: Charade-Rochade, herausgegeben von Axel Haubrok, Distanz Verlag Berlin
- 2013 "Der Prokurator" in: Galerie der Namenlosen, edited by Hanns Zischler, Elke Schmitter, Alpheus Verlag, Berlin
- 2007 "Die Battenberg-Affäre", Berlin Verlag
- 2007 "Die Orientalische Frage" in: Lettre International, No. 78
- 2004 "Moskauer Konzeptualismus, Collection Haralampi G. Oroschakoff", Archiv Vadim Zakharov, edited by Hein-Th. Schulze, Altcappenberg, Kupferstichkabinett Staatliche Museen zu Berlin, Verlag der Buchhandlung Walther König, Cologne
- 2001 "Moskau oder die eigenen Leidenschaften sind nicht verhandelbar und Die Berliner Republik: Was im Werden ist, war schon" in: Moskau-Berlin Stereogramme, edited by Tilman Spengler, Berlin Verlag
- 1999 "Weltverdopplung oder die Realisierung der Orientalischen Frage" in: Dogma 95 Dämonen, edited by Frank Castorf, Volksbühne Berlin, and Kleist–Festtage Frankfurt/Oder
- 1999 "Inhabitants at the Edges of the World: Itinerants and Orientalists", texts by Alexander Borovsky, Margarita Tupitsyn, Kathrin Becker, Marie-Louise von Plessen, Matthias Flügge, Haralampi G. Oroschakoff, Berlin Press
- 1998 "Bulgariaavantgarde", texts by Haralampi G. Oroschakoff, Iara Boubnova (curator), Alexander Kiossev, Luchezar Boyadjiev, Ivailo Ditchev, Diana Popova, edited by Haralampi G. Oroschakoff, Salon Verlag, Cologne
- 1997 "Instant Archaeology", texts by Josif Bakschtejn, Sabine Hänsgen, Aleksander Jakimovič, Michael Meuer, Christian Schneegass, Viktor Tupitsyn, edited by Gerhard Theewen and Berlin Academy of Arts, Salon Verlag, Cologne
- 1997 "Die Akte Odessa", texts by Boris Groys, edited by Reiner Speck and Gerhard Theewen, édition séparée, Salon Verlag, Cologne
- 1996 "Kräftemessen", texts by Nikita Alexejew, Katja Degot, Boris Groys, Sabine Hänsgen, Haralampi G. Oroschakoff, Viktor Misiano, Margarita Tupitsyn, Victor Tupitsyn, Slavoj Žižek, u.a.), edited by Haralampi G. Oroschakoff, Cantz Verlag, Ostfildern
- 1995 "Eine Textsammlung 1979–1994", Reihe Cantz, Cantz Verlag, Ostfildern
- 1994 "Stalnimi Subami-Upustenii Avangard" in: Emigrazia i Straniki, Pastor Zond Edition, No. 5, Cologne
- 1993 "Polis", texts by Luchezar Boyadjiev, Dorothea Eichenauer, Rainer Metzger, Hohenthal und Bergen, Munich
- 1988 "Lampos", texts by Francois Nedellec, Wladimir Sinojew, Luise Horn, Wilfried Dickhoff, edited by Wilfried Dickhoff for Gallery Joachim Becker, Cannes
- 1987 "Oroschakoff", texts by Luise Horn, Wilfried Dickhoff, Noemi Smolik, Kunstraum Munich

== Collections (selection) ==
- Städtische Galerie im Lenbachhaus, Munich
- Museum of Modern Art (MUMOK), Vienna
- Musée d´Art et Contemporain, Geneva
- Berlinische Galerie, Berlin
- Deutsche Bank, Frankfurt/Main
- The State Russian Museum, St. Petersburg
- Documenta Archiv, Kassel
- Museum of Modern Art, Prato, Italy
- Sparkasse Cologne-Bonn
- Kupferstichkabinett Staatliche Sammlungen zu Berlin
- Deutscher Sparkassenverlag, Stuttgart
- Humanic Sammlung, Graz, Austria
- Sammlung Graninger/Rupertinum Salzburg, Austria
- Trevi Flash Art Museum of Contemporary Art – Palazzo Lucarini, Trevi, Italy
- Deutsches Historisches Museum, Berlin
- Archiv und Sammlung Pastor Zond/Vadim Zakharov, Cologne, Moscow/Berlin
- Sammlung Dürckheim
- Sammlung Dieter und Si Rosenkranz, Berlin
- Sammlung Eltz-Oroschakoff, Hamburg
- Sammlung Thomas, Munich
- Sammlung Michel Würthle / Paris Bar, Berlin
- Collection Gimbel, New York
- Collection Holleb, Chicago
- Tiba Art Collection, Belgium
- Sammlung Grafen La Rosée
- Sammlung Baron Gravenreuth
- The Sons Collection, Belgium
- Sammlung Hans und Uschi Welle, Berlin
