= Gerd-Klaus Kaltenbrunner =

German writer and publisher (1939–2011)

Gerd-Klaus Kaltenbrunner (23 February 1939 – 12 April 2011) was an Austrian writer and publisher associated with the German New Right of the 1970s. He promoted what he called "creative conservatism", which he defined as future-oriented and revolutionary in its theory.

== Life and work ==
Gerd-Klaus Kaltenbrunner was born in Vienna on 23 February 1939. He studied philosophy, law and sociology at the University of Vienna and moved to West Germany in 1962. Until the late 1960s, he wrote reviews in academic journals and Die Zeit, where he predominantly praised left-wing writers. He was an editor at Rombach Verlag in Freiburg in 1968–1972 and worked at Herder-Verlag from 1974.

In the 1970s, he became a prominent member of the German New Right through his efforts to relaunch and reformulate conservatism. He became widely discussed in Austria and West Germany, notably for his 1972 essay collection Rekonstruktion des Konservatismus (lit. 'Reconstruction of Conservatism'). He published the bimonthly book series Herderbücherei initiative, which he used as a platform for his conservative project. His writings appeared frequently in Deutschen Zeitung. Christ und Welt, Aus Politik und Zeitgeschichte and the CDU's Die Politische Meinung, and the New Right-aligned periodicals Criticón, Konservativ heute, Scheidewege and Zeitbühne.

He died on 12 April 2011.

== Thought ==
Kaltenbrunner's major influences included Ernst Topitsch's neopositivism, Ernst Karl Winter's Catholic conservatism, Ludwig Klages' emphasis on the physicality of humans and Konrad Lorenz' social biology, but also anarchist writers such as Mikhail Bakunin and Hugo Ball. Other recurring references included Georg Wilhelm Friedrich Hegel, Novalis, Franz von Baader and Vilfredo Pareto. Kaltenbrunner regarded language as something that precedes political practice and sought to develop a conservative canon.

He argued that conservatism is not a "final, fixed doctrine", but rather something that is "reformulated from era to era" and must exist in dialogue with current scientific debates. He made anthropology the core aspect of conservatism of his era and argued in favour of a biologically derived "need for order, security and stability". He described his project as "creative conservatism", in which conservatism must focus on the future rather than the past, and is defined as "prospective, with a view towards its yet-to-be-fulfilled possibilities, as renewal, creativity and rebirth". He argued that contemporary conservatives had more in common with 20th-century revolutionary movements than with 19th-century conservatives, and defined conservative theory as a "theory of revolutionary conservation".

He came from a Catholic milieu, and his influences included Catholic writers from whom he adopted an interest in transcendence and mysticism, but Christianity was not central in his political thoughts.
