= Billy Six =

German documentary filmmaker and journalist

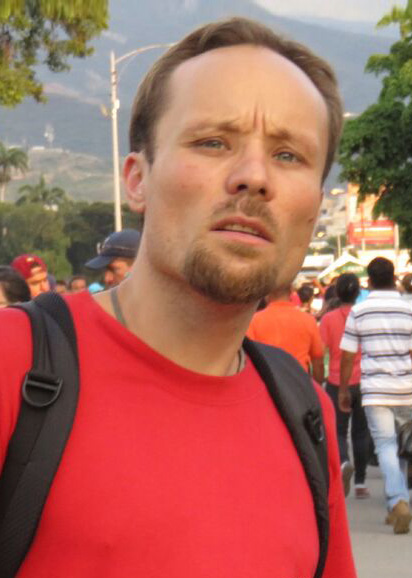
- Born: 24 December 1986 (age 39); East Berlin, East Germany
- Occupations: Vlogger; journalist; activist

YouTube information
- Channel: Billy Six
- Years active: 2011–present
- Genres: Independent journalism; activism
- Subscribers: 25.8 thousand
- Views: 4.32 million
- Last updated: March 2025

Billy Six (born 24 December 1986) is a German independent journalist, activist, author and vlogger (YouTuber). He has been active since 2011, when he worked as a war reporter for German newspaper Junge Freiheit in Egypt, but since then has reported from conflict zones including Libya, Syria, Lebanon, and Ukraine for his YouTube channel.

== Life and career ==
Six graduated from high school in Berlin in 2006. His professional career started as a business administrator and then member of his local parliament of Neuenhagen. By 2011, Six had embarked on a career in journalism, beginning with writing for far-right German newspaper Junge Freiheit. Early in his journalistic career, Six covered the refugee situation in Europe, spending a month with refugees, for Junge Freiheit TV. He also covered the war in Libya for Junge Freiheit, in 2011.

=== Syria ===
In 2012, Six went to cover the Syrian civil war, working for Junge Freiheit. In the course of his reporting, he was arrested by the Syrian army. He was held for 12 weeks under local laws, and only released after an intervention by Russian diplomats. Six continued to write about the Syrian war for Junge Freiheit in 2013.

=== Germany ===
By 2016, Six had already reported extensively from Ukraine, including on Malaysia Airlines Flight 17 (MH17). On 2 August 2016, on the theme of MH17, along with British journalist Graham Phillips, Six entered the Berlin office of the investigative journalism organisation Correctiv without permission. In the Correctiv offices, Phillips, accompanied by Six, demanded an interview with Marcus Bensmann, who was investigating MH17. Upon being refused access to Bensmann, Phillips repeatedly accused Correctiv of lying, shouting "Lying press!", while filming the incident, and refusing to leave. Correctiv called the police, however Phillips and Six evaded them.

==== COVID 19 ====
Six was an open and active coronavirus sceptic, describing the pandemic as 'pure scaremongering'. A Bavaria hospital which Six had filmed, making it out to be empty, reportedly filed charges against him for unauthorised filming. Six had several of his videos on the theme removed from YouTube, and he was further criticised by Correctiv for his position on, and reporting on COVID-19.

Apparently having problems in Germany due to his covid activism, Six left for some time to Georgia, where he did videos for his YouTube channel, mostly contrasting the situation in Georgia regarding lockdowns and restrictions, with that of Germany.

=== Venezuela ===
In late 2018, Six travelled to Venezuela to report on the ongoing crisis in the county, for his YouTube channel. Six had apparently left Venezuela to go to neighbouring Colombia, and was then arrested as he returned to Venezuela, at an inn in Villa Marina, a beach town located in Los Taques Municipality near Punto Fijo. Six was detained in the intelligence prison of the SEBIN, "El Helicoide" by the Venezuelan secret service DGCIM. He was accused of being a German spy, and before a military court indicted of espionage, rebellion, and violation of security zones. Six, who was denied access to a lawyer, declared in his defence that the charges against him "were without foundation".

Berlin initially gave no comment on the detainment of their citizen. On 13 December 2018, Six began a hunger strike, to draw attention to his situation. Six's case attracted considerable controversy, with Reporters Without Borders declaring that the allegations were unproven and calling for his immediate release. Eventually, the Russian government intervened during a meeting of foreign minister Sergiy Lavrov with Venezuelan counterpart Jorge Arreaza at United Nations Conference on Drugs and Crime in Vienna on 14 March 2019. Six was released the next day and on 16 March 2019, he was granted conditional permission to leave the country. The conditions included reporting to authorities in Germany at 15-day intervals and a ban on him speaking about the incident. On January 30, 2025 the Federal Constitutional Court of Germany ruled in Six´ favor after having conducted an administrative lawsuit against the German government since 2020, accusing them to not have supported his release in Venezuela.

=== Ukraine ===
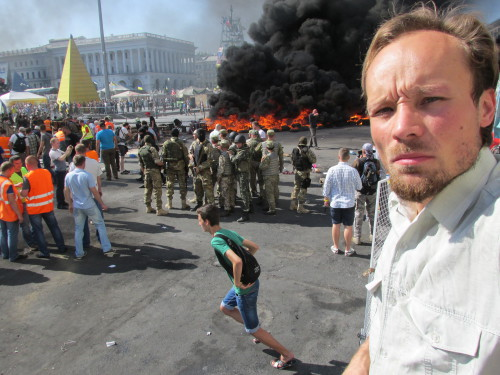
Billy Six in Ukraine

Six often reported from Ukraine in the context of the War in Donbas (2014–2022). He has produced multiple videos on the MH17 disaster, spending extensive time in the crash area, carrying out his own investigative research. Six was interviewed by the BBC in the documentary Conspiracy Files: Who Shot Down MH17 (May 2016). The BBC reported "Six thinks two (Ukrainian) fighter jets shot down MH17 - one firing its cannon, the other firing a missile." He has also given an interview to investigative agency Bellingcat on the theme.

In late 2022, Six returned to Ukraine, making YouTube videos, firstly from Lviv, asking people what they thought of Ukrainian Organisation of Ukrainian Nationalists leader, Stepan Bandera. Six followed this up with a report from the Ukrainian frontlines, interviewing Ukrainian soldiers in what Six described as 'Putin's lost battle'. Six had then wanted to cross from Ukrainian territory, into territory held by Russia, however his request to pro-Russian American Russell Bentley for help in this was firmly rejected, causing the two to fall out, with Bentley accusing Six of having 'switched sides'.

As of late 2024, Six continues to post videos on his YouTube channel, from Germany, and post to his channel on Telegram.

== Books ==
- Das grüne Irrlicht (about German politician Hans-Christian Ströbele) (2012)
- Marsch ins Ungewisse (about Syria) (2014)
- Schuldig im Namen der Asyl-Industrie (2016)

== See also ==
- Eliot Higgins
- Political prisoners in Venezuela
