= Das dritte Reich =

1923 book by Arthur Moeller van den Bruck

Germany's Third Empire
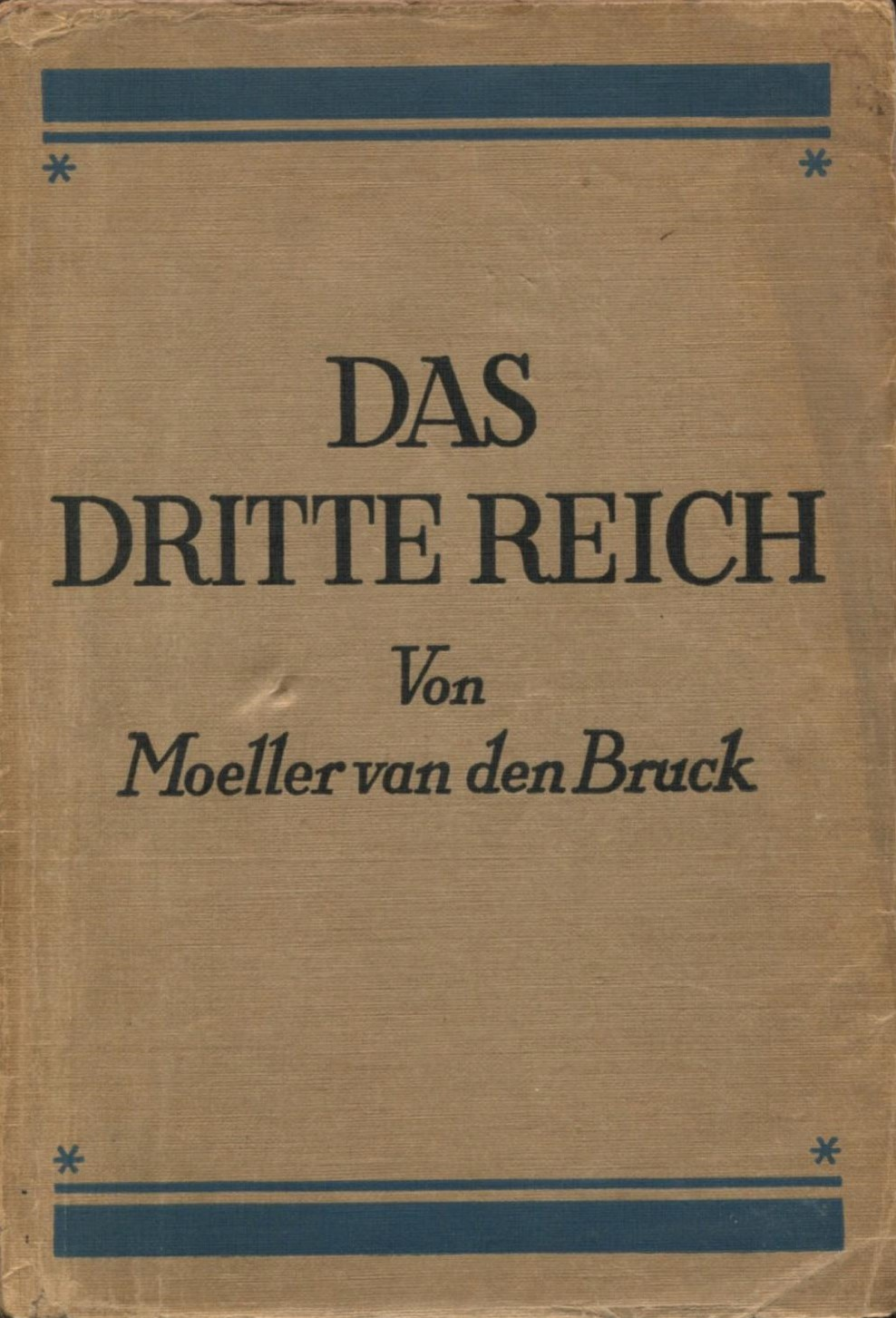
- First edition
- Author: Arthur Moeller van den Bruck
- Original title: Das dritte Reich
- Language: German
- Publisher: Ring Verlag
- Publication date: 1923
- Media type: Print book

Germany's Third Empire (German: Das dritte Reich, lit. 'The Third Realm') is a 1923 book by the German author Arthur Moeller van den Bruck. The book formulated an ideal of national empowerment, which found many adherents in a Germany desperate to rebound from the Treaty of Versailles. For Moeller, Germany's great misfortune lay in the political system created by the Weimar Republic, which had competing parties and liberal ideologies. Moeller was influenced by Friedrich Nietzsche and called for a strong leader. The book is associated with the Conservative Revolution.

== Summary ==
In the preface, Arthur Moeller van den Bruck distanced himself from possible future implications of the concept: "The Third Reich is but a philosophical idea and not for this world, but for the hereafter. Germany could well perish dreaming the Third Reich dream". To pursue the philosophical idea, he believed that Germany would need an Übermensch of the type described by Friedrich Nietzsche but that this individual was not Adolf Hitler or anyone else living.

Moeller's reich is not a state in the usual sense of the word but the ideal condition and the only way in which the scattered German people can achieve a common purpose and destiny. However, this should not be a limited state, and he saw the German Empire established by Otto von Bismarck as an imperfect reich, as it did not include Austria, which survived on from "our First Reich", side by side with "our Second Reich". According to Moeller, "Our Second Reich was a Little-German Reich which we must consider only as a stepping stone on our path to a Greater German Reich".

Moeller called for the Weimar Republic to be replaced through a new revolution from the right. He takes all of his philosophical cues from the work of Nietzsche, "who stands at the opposite pole of thought from Marx".

== Reception ==
Kindlers Neues Literatur Lexikon ties the book to the Conservative Revolution, for which it can be regarded as a manifesto. It describes it as the most important record of antidemocratic thinking in Weimar Germany and of the reactions to World War I, the November Revolution and the Treaty of Versailles. It writes it is a mistake to view Moeller as a direct predecessor to National Socialism; rather, he was a representative of the "dangerous world of political ideas" of which National Socialism was another outgrowth.
