= Jeanne Marni =

French writer

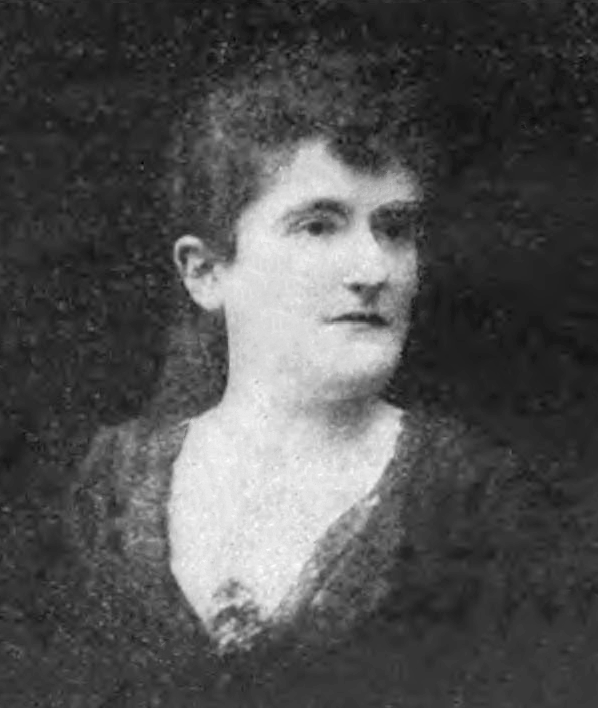
Jeanne Marni

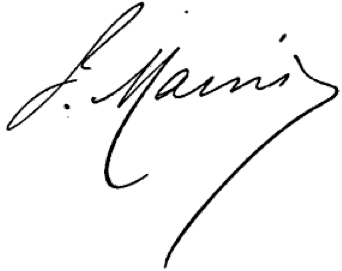
Signature

Jean Marni or J. Marni ( Jeanne-Marie-Francoise Barousse; Mme. Marniere; 1851–1910) was a French writer. She wrote novels, plays, and journalistic pieces. She published a short story at the age of eight, but her other works were published after 1885, after she became a widow. Known by her pseudonym, J. Marni, she wrote a number of novels that were very French in tone. The best known are La Femme de Silva, L'Amour Coupable, Papote, and La Princesse Sablina. Others of her works, that have been translated into English and other languages, include Frangoise, Reaction, Le Veilleur and La Piece du Vin. She took up subjects considered repugnant to a woman of her time, and wrote them "threadbare". Most of her works are psychological studies—analyses of the human passions. She had a large following of readers in France.

== Early life and education ==
Marni was born in Toulouse in 1851. The daughter of a "femme de lettres", she trained as an actress.

== Career ==
In March, 1907, a writer for Le Figaro said: "Jeanne Marni is totally different from the conception we generally have of a literary woman. She is pretty, distinguished looking with her abundance of white hair. Her cheeks are rosy, her eyes dreamy, her smile full of charm, and her costume always one of sober color and soft material. The most striking thing about her is that, although she has won a high place in contemporary literature, she is profoundly, absolutely and sweetly feminine. As a friend she is reliable, cordial and indulgent. She is a good listener and consequently learns many secrets of a confidential nature. Her intimate knowledge of the human heart has made her a rather cynical philosopher, but one without bitterness, for she is endowed with an excellent sense of humor."

In 1871, she married Victor Désiré Marnière. After his death in 1880, Marni began to write both plays and novels. Her work was published in Le National, Le Petit Journal, L’Echo de Paris, and Le Journal. She then wrote a long novel entitled L'Un et l'autre. She was a regular editor of Femina. Marni was an eager worker and wrote a certain number of pages each day. By reason of her health, the active life of Paris was somewhat severe for her, but she has a villa at Cannes, where she lived and worked for nine months of the year.

To the drama, Marni contributed a large number of one-act plays: L’Aile, La Coopérative, L’heureux Auteur, and two works of considerable importance: Manoune (1901), and Le Joug (1902). She wrote, in collaboration with Camille Mauclair, a four-act comedy, La Montée. She produced a number of dialogued scenes of the sort brought into vogue by Gyp and Henri Lavedan. They were written in a series of brief, incisive, ironical lines that characterized a person or portrayed a situation. Among the best of these were Vacances, Acquitté and Premier Jeudi.

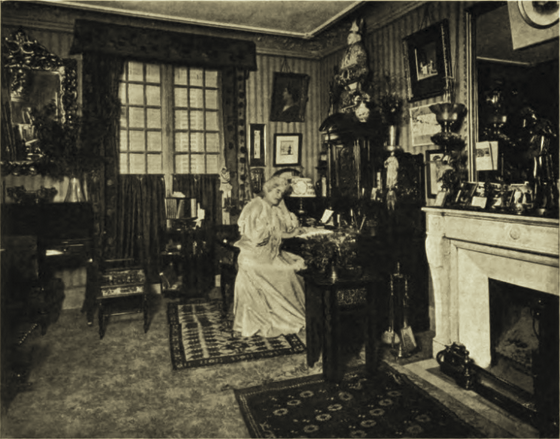
(undated)

In her novels, Marni boldly and cruelly revealed the weaknesses, the cowardice and the sorrows of "eternal woman". The audacity of her dramatic efforts delayed the success of her first novels: La Femme (le Sylva), Amour coupable, Comment elles se donnent, Comment elles nous lz'lchent and Les Enfants qu’elles ont. She did not really succeed in winning her place as a novelist until the appearance of Le Livre d’une amoureuse and Pierre Tisserand. These two are sequels. They show the anguish that is felt by a loving woman who has become passionately attached to a man but cannot inspire him with a profound and faithful love. Marni was not indulgent toward the weaknesses of masculine humanity, and with her disconcerting knowledge of man's petty vices, she was able to denounce them effectively and seemed to feel a vengeful joy in so doing.
