= Gabriele von Schrenck-Notzing =

German baroness

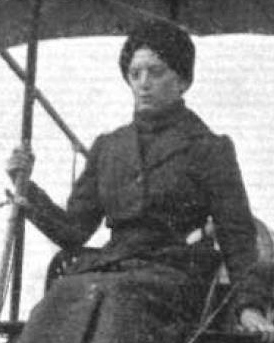
- Born: Gabriele Siegle; 18 July 1872; Stuttgart, Baden-Württemberg, Germany
- Died: 3 August 1953 (aged 81); Ammerland, Germany
- Occupation: Female Aviator
- Spouse: Albert Freiherr von Schrenck-Notzing
- Children: 2

Gabriele von Schrenck-Notzing (1872–1953) was a German baroness and 20th-century female aviator.

== Family ==
Born on 18 July 1872 in Stuttgart, Germany as Gabriele Siegle, Gabriele von Shrenck-Notzing was a daughter of Julie (Wetzel) von Siegle and Gustav von Siegle (1840-1905), an industrialist in Stuttgart, Germany who became co-owner of BASF, the German chemical manufacturer which would later become part of the chemical and pharmaceutical conglomerate IG Farben.

During her formative years, Gabriele Siegle primarily resided at the Villa Reinsburg in Stuttgart with her parents and seven siblings, but also spent part of this time with them at Friedensfels, the Siegle's estate in Germany's Upper Palatinate region. The family also summered at their Lake Starnberg home, Ammerland, also known as Villa Siegle. In 1887, her father was elected to the German Reichstag, representing Württemberg in Berlin from 1887-1898.

Of the seven Siegle siblings, Gabriele and her sisters, Dora (born 3 April 1877) and Margarete (born 23 August 1867), were the only three to survive until adulthood. All three then ultimately began their own families with Dora and Margarete marrying Fritz von Gemmingen-Hornberg and Karl von Ostertag, respectively, in Stuttgart on 7 July 1887 and at Ammerland on 1 October 1896, while Gabriele Siegle wed Baron Albert Freiherr von Schrenck-Notzing (1862-1929) in Stuttgart on 17 September 1892.

"A descendant of Bavarian Protestant nobility who had been knights of the Holy Roman Empire," according to Paul Gottfried, Raffensperger Professor of Humanities at Elizabethtown College in Pennsylvania, the Baron von Schrenck was also reportedly "a close friend of the author Thomas Mann. As aristocrats, the couple had the economic freedom to engage in professional and recreational pursuits that were beyond the means of most men and women of their era. A practicing psychologist in Munich, Baron von Schrenck also became a much-publicized researcher. Per the Guinness Book of World Records, he made history in 1896 as "the first referenced ... psychologist called upon to testify in a court of law." Also involved in the research of paranormal events, he studied the claims of mediums and other spiritualists during the early 1900s, and published the English translation of his book, Phenomena of Materialisation, in 1923. Baroness von Schrenck-Notzing is mentioned in this book as having attended the "Sitting of 11th September 1912" with her husband, and a "Mme. Bisson" and "Dr. Kafka" during which "control, illumination and hypnotisation" were investigated.

The Baron and Baroness von Schrenck also became the parents of two sons: Leopold von Schrenck-Notzing (1894-1970) and Gustav Freiherr von Schrenck-Notzing (1896-1943), who was born in Munich on 6 November 1896.

As her youngest son entered his mid-teen years, Gabriele von Schrenck-Notzing began to make not just women's history – but world history. Leaving all she knew sometime around 1911, she traveled to France, where she began her training as an aviator, a process she continued off and on for the next several years. (See "Aviation training and career" section below.)

After nearly 30 years of marriage, she was then widowed by her husband in 1929. Following his passing on February 12, he was interred at Waldfriedhof München in Grosshadern, Münchener Stadtkreis, Bavaria (Bayern), Germany.

Her sons, meanwhile, had grown up to become business executives like their father. Leopold von Schrenck-Notzing was an executive and shareholder with his father's company, BASF (which then became part of IG Farben) while Gustav served as the president and chairman of the board of the Württembergischer Metallwarenfabrik, a glassware and metalware manufacturer in Potsdam in 1943. Both companies were known to have used Jewish slave laborers at their respective facilities during World War II. Post-war, Leopold von Schrenck-Notzing was active in BASF's restructuring and 1952 relaunch.

Caspar Freiherr von Schrenck-Notzing (1927-2009), the son of Gustav Freiherr von Schrenck-Notzing and grandson of Albert and Gabriele von Schrenck-Notzing, became a well known writer and publisher as a representative of Germany's New Right.

== Aviation training and career ==
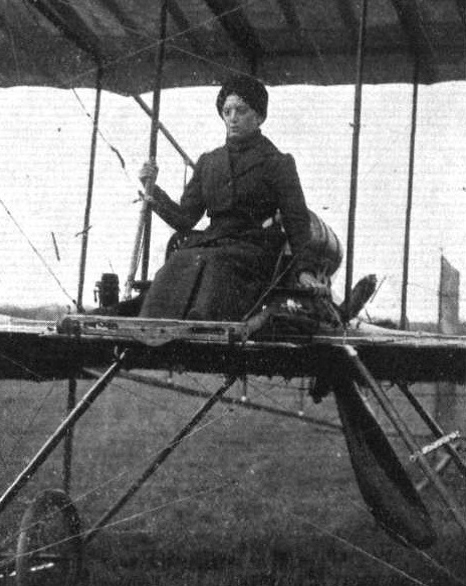
German Baroness Gabriele von Schrenck-Notzing at the controls of a biplane, London Aerodrome, Herndon, Great Britain, 1912 (full view, public domain)

During the second decade of the new century, Gabriele von Schrenck-Notzing became an aviator.

Taught to fly biplanes by several of the most accomplished male aviators of her day, she studied with the French aviator and aircraft designer, Roger Sommer, at his school in Douzy, France in October 1911, and then again at his larger facility in Mourmelon, France 1912. The 23 March 1912 edition of Flight reported on her activities as follows:

Mourmelon. – Sommer School. – Lieuts. Mailfert and Bosquet were out on monoplanes, and Bathiat tested four new military monoplanes fresh from the works. The pupils, Lieut. de Clerck, Baroness de Schrenck, David and Revelli each made several rounds of the course. Robinet carried several passengers on his biplane.

In May 1912, she took her first lesson with British aviator Lewis W. F. Turner, the chief instructor at the Grahame-White School, which operated out of the London Aerodrome on Collindale Avenue in Hendon. According to the 1 June 1912 edition of Flight, "Friday, Mr. Lewis Turner was at instruction flights on Biplane No. 10, afterwards taking up tree new pupils in the passenger seat, viz., Lieut. Rathbone, Baroness Schenk [sic], and Mr. Scully." Later that same month, she was reported as "doing circles ... on Howard Wright" as part of her instruction. The weather that date was described as "none too good, a mixture of fog, remous and a ten-mile wind." She went up in the biplane at least two more times that month, and was recorded as "doing straights." The 29 June edition of this same publication also noted that she had filed entry papers to fly in the Ladies' Aviation Meeting, a competition for female aviators at the London Aerodrome in July 1912.

Later that same month (July 1912), she damaged her biplane while landing. According to Flight's 27 July edition:

The school, waking to a fine morning on Monday last week, turned out in force at 4 o'clock.... In the evening, Mr. Roupell out again ... had to put in for repairs. Baroness Schenk [sic] making excellent straights, but after landing hurriedly to avoid some people had to turn sharply on the ground, the strain on the tail skid severely damaging the tall cellule.

She then continued to have equipment problems for the remainder of the month. Per Flight's 3 August 1912 edition, her "engine broke a tappet rod."

== Death and interment ==
Following her husband's death in 1929, Baroness Gabriele von Schenck-Notzing continued to reside in Germany.

She died at her family's estate at Ammerland on 3 August 1953. She was buried at Waldfriedhof München in Grosshadern, Münchener Stadtkreis, Bavaria (Bayern), Germany.
