= Arthur Moeller van den Bruck =

German historian (1876–1925)

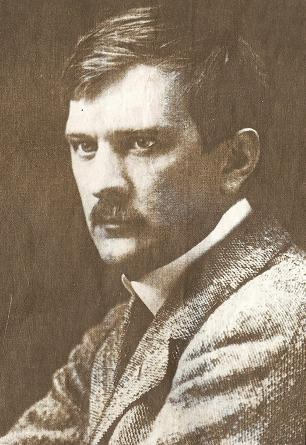
- van den Bruck in 1930
- Born: 23 April 1876; Solingen, Westphalia, German Empire
- Died: 30 May 1925 (aged 49); Berlin, Weimar Germany
- Spouse: Hedda Eulenberg (m. 1897; div. 1904)

Arthur Wilhelm Ernst Victor Moeller van den Bruck (23 April 1876 – 30 May 1925) was a German cultural historian, philosopher, and key intellectual figure of the Conservative Revolution.

As an author and political theorist, he remains best known for his controversial 1923 book Das Dritte Reich ("The Third Reich"), which promoted German nationalism and ended up strongly influencing the NSDAP; despite his open opposition to and numerous criticisms of Adolf Hitler.

From 1906 to 1922, he also published Elisabeth Kaerrick's first full German translation of Dostoyevsky's written works.

== Biography ==
Moeller van den Bruck was born on 23 April 1876 in Solingen, Westphalia, as the only child of bourgeois parents. His father was Ottomar Victor Moeller, a German state architect, and his mother was Elise van den Bruck, the daughter of Dutch architect van den Broeck and (allegedly) a Spanish mother. Moeller van den Bruck's given name was "Arthur" in honour of Arthur Schopenhauer, but he would later drop that part from his name.

He was expelled from a gymnasium, a German secondary school, for his indifference towards his studies. The young Moeller van den Bruck believed German literature and philosophy, particularly the works of Nietzsche, to be a more vital education. He later continued his studies on his own in Berlin, Paris and Italy.

In 1897 he married Hedda Maase (later Eulenberg). She divorced him in 1904.

Moeller van den Bruck's eight-volume cultural history Die Deutschen, unsere Menschengeschichte ("The Germans, Our People's History") appeared in 1905. In 1907, he returned to Germany, and in 1914, he enlisted in the army at the start of World War I. Soon, he joined the press office of the Foreign Ministry and was attached to the foreign affairs section of the German Supreme Army Command.

His essay Der Preußische Stil ("The Prussian Style") in which he celebrated the essence of Prussia as "the will to the state" appeared in 1916 and marked his embrace of nationalism. It showed him as an opponent of parliamentary democracy and liberalism, and it exerted a strong influence on the Jungkonservativen ("young conservative movement").

After a nervous breakdown, he committed suicide in Berlin on 30 May 1925.

Moeller van den Bruck was the joint founder of the "June Club" (Juniklub), which sought to influence young conservatives in the fight against the Treaty of Versailles. Later, it was renamed Deutscher Herrenklub ("German Gentlemen's Club"), became very powerful and helped Franz von Papen to become Reichskanzler in 1932.

== Influence on Nazism ==
In his 1918 book Das Recht der jungen Völker ("The Right of Young Nations"), Moeller van den Bruck presents a version of the Sonderweg theory in which he developed the theme of Russia as representing communist civilisation and the United States representing capitalist civilisation, both of which are rejected. Germany is held up as the model between the two extremes. In the same book, Moeller van den Bruck advocated an expressly anti-Western and anti-imperialist philosophy of the state (Staatstheorie), which attempted to bridge the gap between nationalism and concepts of social justice.

He had a major influence on the Jungkonservativen (Young Conservatives) in their opposition to the Weimar Republic. He may have also supplied the Nazis with some of the concepts underpinning their movement, but upon meeting Hitler in 1922, Bruck rejected him for his "proletarian primitiveness". The Nazis still made use of his ideas where they could, including appropriating the title of his 1923 book Das Dritte Reich (meaning "The Third Reich") as a political slogan and the Germanic Übermensch idea.

=== Das Dritte Reich (1923) ===
Das Dritte Reich (The Third Reich) formulated an "ideal" of national empowerment, which found many adherents in a Germany desperate to rebound from the Treaty of Versailles.

== Works ==
- Die moderne Literatur in Gruppen und Einzeldarstellungen (1900)
- Das Variété: Eine Kulturdramaturgie (1900)
- Die Deutschen: Unsere Menschheitsgeschichte (1904)
- Zeitgenossen (1905)
- Die italienische Schönheit (1913)
- Der preußische Stil (1915)
- Das Recht der jungen Völker (1918)
- Das Dritte Reich (1923)

== See also ==
- Armin Mohler

== Sources ==
- Sebastian Maaß, Kämpfer um ein drittes Reich. Arthur Moeller van den Bruck und sein Kreis. Regin-Verlag, Kiel, 2010.
- Stan Lauryssens, The Man Who Invented the Third Reich: The Life and Times of Arthur Moeller Van Den Bruck. Sutton Publishing, NY, 2003. ISBN 0-7509-3054-3.
- Gabor Hamza, The Idea of the “Third Reich” in the German Legal, Philosophical and Political Thinking in the 20th Century. Diritto e cultura 11 (2001), pp. 127–138.
- Fritz Stern, The Politics of Cultural Despair: A Study in the Rise of Germanic Ideology, UCP, Berkeley, 1974. ISBN 0-520-02626-8.
