= Junge Freiheit =

German right-wing weekly newspaper

- Type: Weekly newspaper
- Publisher: Junge Freiheit Verlag GmbH & Co. KG
- Editor-in-chief: Dieter Stein
- Founded: May 1986
- Political alignment: National-conservative; Right-wing
- Language: German
- Headquarters: Berlin, Germany
- Circulation: 31,161 (Q1, 2020)
- Website: jungefreiheit.de

The Junge Freiheit (JF, "Young Freedom") is a German weekly newspaper on politics and culture that was established in 1986. Junge Freiheit is politically conservative, right-wing, and nationalistic; it is further described as the "ideological supply ship of right-wing populism" in Germany.

According to the scholar Gideon Botsch, JF is a "hinge between national conservatism and the extreme right". Alexander Gauland, a co-founder of Alternative for Germany, has claimed that "Whoever wants to understand Alternative for Germany ought to read Junge Freiheit".

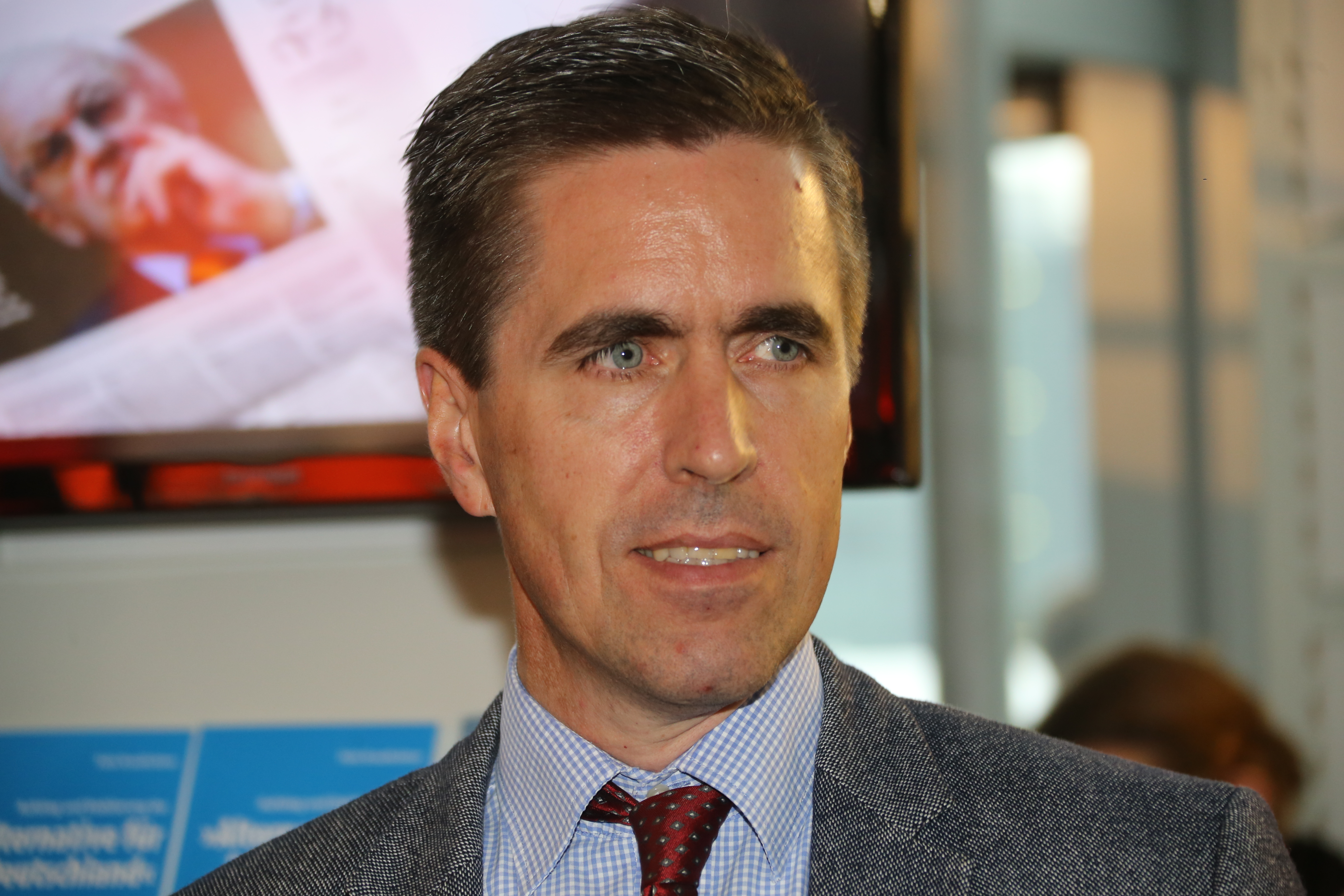
Dieter Stein, founder and editor-in-chief of the newspaper

== History ==
JF was founded by students in Freiburg im Breisgau in May 1986 on the initiative of the 19-year-old Dieter Stein. The founders described the newspaper as a reaction to the "dominance of the leftist 68.Generation" among university teachers. In 1993, the newspaper moved its headquarters to Potsdam, near Berlin, and to Hohenzollerndamm, Berlin, in 1995.

On December 4, 1994, an unknown group carried out an arson attack on the printing plant in Weimar where the newspaper was produced. There was damage of more than one million DM.

JF had a circulation of 31,161 paid copies in the first quarter of 2020, which was an increase of 28 percent relative to the first quarter of 2015. In 2016, the British weekly magazine The Economist noted the grown reputation and influence of Junge Freiheit amid the surge of the Alternative for Germany and concluded that "the presence of a right-wing voice in Germany's media landscape is part of the country's path to political normality".

== Issues and style ==
The JF has one section for politics, one for culture and for foreign affairs and pays less attention to economics. There is a substantial number of opinions and commentaries, including weekly opinion columns. Every week, the paper also conducts an interview with a prominent politician, author, scientist or artist.

== Ruling ==
JF was involved in a legal battle relating to the freedom of the press against two local State Offices for the Protection of the Constitution in which the newspaper was represented by its lawyer, and frequent supporter, the former German Attorney-General Alexander von Stahl (FDP). The Offices for the Protection of the Constitution in two federal states, North Rhine Westphalia and Baden-Württemberg, mentioned Junge Freiheit in their yearly reports of alleged "anti-constitutional activities" between 1995 and 2005, along with most publications and organizations affiliated with the Left Party. The newspaper successfully sued the North Rhine Westphalia local authorities, and the Federal Constitutional Court of Germany ruled the classification to be unconstitutional in 2005 (the so-called "Office for the Protection of the Constitution report case" or "Junge Freiheit Case").

Since then, neither state's report has mentioned the newspaper.

== People ==
The founder and editor-in-chief and managing director of JF is Dieter Stein.

Its prominent contributors include Holger Zastrow, Wolf Jobst Siedler, Frederick Forsyth, Alain de Benoist, Paul Gottfried, Elliot Neaman, Rolf Hochhuth, Ralph Raico, Derek Turner, Billy Six, Klaus Rainer Röhl and Fritz Schenk. Its prominent public supporters include also Alexander von Stahl and Peter Scholl-Latour.

== Gerhard Löwenthal Prize ==
Together with the German "Foundation for Conservative Education and Research" (Förderstiftung Konservative Bildung und Forschung), Junge Freiheit awards the Gerhard Löwenthal Prize, a biannual prize for conservative journalists.

== Literature by Junge Freiheit Authors ==
- Götz Kubitschek: 20 Years of Junge Freiheit – The Idea and History of a Newspaper. Edition Antaios, Schnellroda 2006, ISBN 3-935063-40-7.
- Alexander von Stahl: The Fight for Press Freedom. Chronology of a Scandal. The Constitutional Complaint by the Weekly Newspaper "Junge Freiheit" for Violation of Freedom of Expression and Freedom of the Press by Reports from the Office for the Protection of the Constitution of the State of North Rhine-Westphalia (= Documentation, Volumes 5–7). Edition JF, Berlin 2003–2004, ISBN 3-929886-15-4, ISBN 3-929886-17-0, ISBN 3-929886-18-9.
- Thorsten Thaler (ed.): 25 Years of Junge Freiheit. A Path to Freedom! – A German Newspaper History. Edition JF, Berlin 2011, ISBN 978-3-929886-36-8.

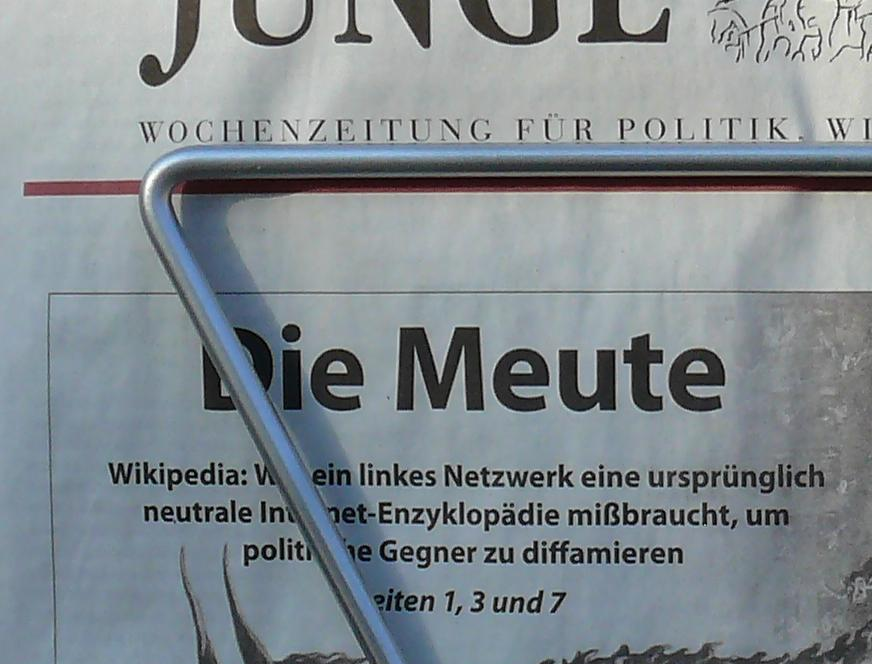
Junge Freiheit criticizes parts of the Wikipedia authorship in June 2011.
