= Querfront =

German political term

Querfront (German: [ˈkʋeːɐˌfʁɔnt] – lit. 'cross-front') is a German term originating from Weimar politics which refers to the cooperation between the far-right and far-left, or between nationalist and socialist ideologies, as well as the combination of their positions. It is primarily understood as a populist strategy to unite forces in an effort to gain power. The term was first and most prominently used in the Weimar Republic, where it referred to the cooperation between conservative revolutionaries and the far-left.

The term sees adoption as a descriptor, or outright stated strategy, in modern-day Germany. Some have however criticized the modern usage as inaccurate from a historical perspective.

== History ==
Some factions and members in the KPD and KAPD, who rejected the Treaty of Versailles, were ready to align themselves with dissident nationalist groups in the German army in order to garner more support. These members, primarily Heinrich Laufenberg and Fritz Wolffheim, were at the time described as "National Bolsheviks", but would retroactively also be cited as examples of the Querfront strategy. Later, explicit National Bolsheviks such as Ernst Niekisch and Karl Otto Paetel would emerge, which directly supported the combination of nationalist and socialist ideologies. Paetel explicitly engaged in this strategy, stating the goal of his organizations, first the Arbeitsring junge Front, and later the Group of Social Revolutionary Nationalists, to bring together radicals of left and right in pursuit of a "third way" between the NSDAP and the KPD, encompassing both nationalism and socialist economics.

Chancellor of the Weimar Republic between 1932 and 1933, Kurt von Schleicher, is credited with the first practical use of the strategy, in part characterizing the term, seeking to create a Querfront as a support base for his chancellorship through attempting to split off the Strasserist segment of the Nazi Party in order to merge it with the trade unions as way of forcing Hitler to support his government. This plan however failed, and it is disputed if Schleicher was actually serious about his proposal.

== Modern examples and usage ==
In a February 1989 interview with the magazine Tempo, the leader of the German neo-Nazi scene at the time, Michael Kühnen, was asked why anarchists and neo-Nazis did not band together to fight the state, and stated in response: "There are a number of reasons for acting together: both the Autonomists and the National Socialists despise the bourgeois order. Both hate its decadence and fight against democracy. After we have gotten rid of this pig system, we can squabble about which order is superior."

The Combat League of German Socialists (1999–2008, KDS) was founded with the explicit aim of uniting the political left and right via the Querfront strategy, wanting to eliminate differences between the two sides and serve as a "Discussion and combat forum on the basis of the collective commitment to Volk and homeland". The strategy has failed the group overall, it being able to attract few actual leftists and being described by a former member, Axel Reitz, as "nothing more than the usual neo-Nazi group", which lead to its dissolution in 2008. Despite this overall failure however, the Berlin sector of the organization led by Michael Koth, a former communist activist who lead his own Querfront group before the KDS known as the Workers' Party of Germany (PdAD), was said to have a far more national bolshevik lean, taking influences from both Juche and the former SED.

During the COVID-19 protests in Germany, some publications have used the term to refer to left-wing and right-wing cooperation on demonstrations. David Begrich however argued in Die Tageszeitung that the term was misused in the situation since, while the left and right had cooperated, their generally opposing ideals remained separate and didn't combine or move towards approaching each other.

Former prominent politician Sahra Wagenknecht (formerly Left Party, now BSW, her own party) has on some occasions been accused of running on a Querfront strategy through her idea of "conservative leftism". This accusation became most prominent after the Berlin peace rally on 14 February 2023 organized by Wagenknecht and feminist Alice Schwarzer, which called for negotiations and a stop of military support to Ukraine, since many supporters of Russia and the far-right were in attendance. A 2023 article in The Washington Post additionally suggested that the Kremlin is trying to establish a German anti-war coalition between Wagenknecht and the Alternative for Germany based on the Querfront model.

The term Querfront is also used to refer to the far-right taking on, or rather more explicitly talking about, left-wing issues such as anti-capitalism, or taking on left-wing strategies as seen in the Autonomous Nationalists.

=== Querfront media ===
A number of media outlets were founded in 2000s Germany that have been described as Querfront. Many view themselves as alternative media, having a critical view of modern mainstream journalism.

Some notable Querfront outlets are and were:

- Compact, a German magazine, which is generally described as far-right, founded by former left-wing activist Jürgen Elsässer, that has been called a "Querfront-Magazine".
- Manova News, formerly known as Rubikon, an online blog that has been described as right-wing and as spreading conspiracy theories.
- Wir selbst, a national-revolutionary magazine, published between 1979 and 2002, that has been described as Querfront.

== See also ==
- Autonome Nationalisten
- Compact (German magazine)
- Combat League of German Socialists
- Ernst Niekisch
- Fico's Fourth Cabinet
- Horseshoe theory
- Juche
- Kurt von Schleicher
- Left-conservatism
- Michael Koth
- National-anarchism
- National Bolshevism
- Pact of Pacification
- Red fascism
- Red–green–brown alliance
- Strasserism
- Third Position
- Workers' Party of Germany

== Literature ==
- Bozic, Ivo: Die Querfront als weltpolitisches Phänomen. In: Markus Liske, Manja Präkels (2015). Vorsicht Volk!, oder, Bewegungen im Wahn?. Verbrecher Verlag. ISBN 978-3-95732-121-3
