= Nazi-Maoism =

Syncretic political ideology

Flag of the New Order (Ordine Nuovo), with whom Freda was affiliated.

Nazi-Maoism was a political movement and an ideology that emerged in Italy around 1968, with the formation of a group known as Struggle of the People (Lotta di Popolo). This group of students, from the Sapienza University of Rome, took heavy inspiration from the writings and theories of Franco Freda, and advocated for a combination of ideas from both the far-left and the far-right. According to the neo-fascist group Terza Posizione, Nazi-Maoism's stance was "neither capitalism nor communism, neither reds nor reactionary". Nazi-Maoists such as Freda wanted to form a "fascist dictatorship of the proletariat", by using the Maoist guerrilla strategy of people's war to overthrow the government and the bourgeoisie.

Nazi-Maoism is mostly believed to have faded away after the Lotta di Popolo group dissolved itself in 1973. Some forms of Nazi-Maoism were still being espoused by other groups until the late 1970s, but they were not as active as the Struggle of the People was. Some slogans are still being used by numerous extra-parliamentary right-wing political groups, such as Terza Posizione and Forza Nuova. Despite the accentuated anti-communist and nationalist positions which are typically espoused by far-right political groups, they strongly focus on social problems, and they are also violently anti-American and anti-Zionist.

== Outside Italy ==
The Organisation Lutte du Peuple explained to its militants: “Don’t be afraid to use so-called leftist terminology, provided, of course, you specify or modify its meaning”. The OLP denounced the West and “a Europe mentally and politically colonized” by cultural imperialism, the only solution to which was “a class struggle between ruling nations and ruled nations,” that is, a “fight for liberation from imperialism (USA-USSR-ZIONISM),” which was the work of the Jews. That liberation was supposed to eliminate the “pro-Russian or pro-American Kollabos,” and “it will build a new cultural order founded on a virile Socialism: European Socialism.”.

— Jean-Yves Camus in Far-Right Politics in Europe, quoting OLP newspaper La Flamme (January 1972)

=== In Finland ===
SS-veterans Sakari Haikala and Aarne Roiha were founding members of Maoist Finland–China Society, and were also members of its board. Lieutenant Colonel and fascist MP Paavo Susitaival jokingly described himself as a "Maoist-Democratic fascist". The pro-Maoist position among Finnish far-right was at least partially motivated by the anti-Soviet position of Mao's China. Haikala said: "We visited the Helsinki embassy of China, and they showed anti-Russkie propaganda movies with massive cheering Chinese armies demanding attack to the USSR. We cheered also, this is the salvation of Finland. I still think that." Kai Murros is a prominent neo-fascist thought leader in Finland who has identified as a Maoist.

=== In France and Belgium ===
In France, a sister organization of the Italian Lotta di Popolo was called Lutte du Peuple. It was created from the remains of Giovane Europe and Jeune-Europe, which were sister organizations structured around ideas propagated mainly by Jean Thiriart. Among the founders of Lutte du Peuple were some dissident left-wing nationalists of the Ordre Nouveau and European socialists of the Pour une Jeune-Europe (not to be confused with Jeune-Europe headed by Thiriart), directed by Yves Batille. These organizations were a mix of Thiriart's theses with a Maoism adapted to the European scene but there was a fundamental difference because while for Thiriart Maoism was a secondary element, for Nazi-Maoist organizations it was a fundamental element. Thiriart admired the People's Republic of China and Socialist Republic of Romania, indicating a sympathy towards Communist states that displayed strong Nationalist characteristics and certain degrees of independence from the Soviet Union. Historian Walter Laqueur called his views a form of Fascist Maoism. Nazi-Maoist ideas were also noticeably manifested in the ideology of the Fédération d'action nationale et européenne (FANE).

The Franco-Belgian Parti Communautaire National-Européen's founding membership included both those whose background was neo-fascism and former Maoists. Thiriart served as a main inspiration and an advisor for a time after the foundation of the group. Even later on, PCN leader and former FANE activist Luc Michel advocated the idea of a "Eurasian axis" between China, Russia, and Iran as an alternative to Western hegemony, and called for an international tribunal in China to prosecute colonial crimes.

=== In Ukraine ===
In late 2019, Ukraine's Azov movement's literature club and publishing outfit Plomin ("Flame" in Ukrainian) presented a translation of Freda's writings into Ukrainian. Freda's ideas were also promoted in Ukraine by neo-Nazi groups Karpatska Sich and Wotan Jugend.

=== Elsewhere ===
Sister organizations were created in Germany, such as the Cause of the People / National-Revolutionary Organisational Structure (Sache des Volkes / Nationalrevolutionäre Aufbauorganisation, SdV-NRAO), Workers' Party of Germany and Combat League of German Socialists (Kampfbund Deutscher Sozialisten / KDS).

== See also ==
- National Bolshevism
- Christian Bouchet
- Curzio Malaparte
- Michael Koth
- Horst Mahler
- Sorelianism
- Strasserism
- Feudal Fascism
