= Workers' Party of Germany =

Workers' Party of Germany Partei der Arbeit Deutschlands
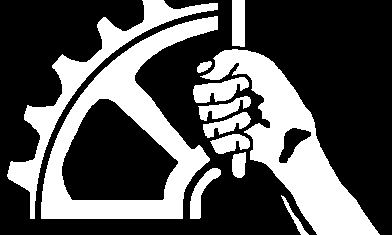
- Abbreviation: PdAD
- Leader: Michael Koth
- Founded: 1995; 31 years ago
- Dissolved: 1998; 28 years ago
- Headquarters: Nordhausen
- Ideology: Juche; National Bolshevism; National communism; Strasserism; Querfront
- Political position: Syncretic

The Workers' Party of Germany (German: Partei der Arbeit Deutschlands, PdAD) was a minor political party in Germany. It saw its mission in overcoming the left-right political divide via the Querfront strategy.

The party modeled itself around the Workers' Party of Korea and its Juche ideology, which it viewed as national communist. According to Michael Koth, founder and leader of the party, it attracted and united members of the DKP, former FDJ, as well as revolutionary nationalists and nationalist socialists. It saw itself as a "Union of national communists and national revolutionaries" in the spirit of the Strasser brothers, Ernst Niekisch, and Anton Ackermann that pursued a "German Socialism".

The PdAD believed that the German Democratic Republic had not failed on the social, but rather the national question; which is why the next socialism on German soil must, according to the party, be a national and German socialism to survive. The party thus saw itself inspired by the Juche ideology, which had endured the collapse of communism.

== Relationship to other groups ==
The PdAD had a very close relationship with the Society for Study and Propagation of the Juche Idea in Germany (German-Korean Friendship Society), German: Gesellschaft zum Studium und Verbreitung der Chuch’e-Ideologie in Deutschland (deutsch-koreanische Freundschaft); a group which had also been primarily initiated by Michael Koth.

The party viewed the political right as divided into two sections, the "reactionary right" (such as the REP and DVU) which welcomed the downfall of the German Democratic Republic and were thus viewed as "Agents of the FRG-Regime", and the "progressive right" (such as the NPD) which wanted the best for the nation and recognized that the reunification did not unite the German people, but deepened the divide between East and West.

Over its existence, the PdAD grew closer with the neo-nazi movement and later aligned itself with the National Democratic Party of Germany, which had invited Michael Koth, as a proponent of "German Socialism", to the 7 February 1998 NPD-Party congress in Passau, where the PdAD had an info booth. In 1998, the PdAD and NPD delegation were invited by ambassador Ri San Yu to attended an event hosted by the North Korean Embassy in Berlin. PdAD members could also often be seen on NPD-led demonstrations.

== Legacy ==
Michael Koth, founder and leader of the PdAD, later went on to be a founding member of the Kampfbund Deutscher Sozialisten in 1999 along with several Neo-Nazis. The KDS was a political group which aimed to carry on the Querfront strategy and establish itself as a German socialist and National Bolshevik force in Germany. While considerably more well-known and successful than the PdAD, the KDS dissolved in 2007, stating their strategy to have failed.

Koth later went on to found and become the leader of the Anti-imperialist Platform (Antiimperialistische Plattform), a Juche and pro-North Korea group in Berlin, which he still leads to this day. This group has been acknowledged by the government of North Korea, which mentioned the AIP in a KCNA press-release about 11th anniversary of Kim Jong Il's death.
