= Red–green–brown alliance =

Proposed political concept

The term "red–green–brown alliance" (French: alliance rouge–verte–brune), is a term referring to an alleged alliance between multiple political forces, each associated with a separate colour.

The term has been used in France and elsewhere to refer to an alleged alliance of leftists (red), Islamists (green), and the far right (brown). The term has also been used to describe alleged alliances of industrial union-focused leftists (red), ecologically-minded agrarians (green), and the far right (brown).

== History ==
French essayist Alexandre del Valle wrote of "a red–brown–green ... ideological alliance" in a 22 April 2002 article in the Le Figaro newspaper, also writing of "red–brown–green, the strange alliance" in a January 2004 article in the Politique Internationale magazine. Del Valle's conceptual rendering of Islamist ideological trends appears to be based at least partially on earlier writings in which he charged the United States and Western Europe with favouring the "war machine" of "armed Islamism" via its funding of the Afghan mujahideen in the Soviet–Afghan War during the Ronald Reagan presidency. In 2010, del Valle published an essay in Italy titled "Verdi, Rossi, Neri. La convergenza degli estremismi antioccidentali: islamismo, comunismo, neonazismo" ("Green, Red, Black. The Convergence of Anti-Western Extremism: Islamism, Communism, and Neonazism").

The later popularity of the red–green–brown theory and its various permutations derives mainly from a speech given by Roger Cukierman, president of the Conseil Représentatif des Institutions juives de France (CRIF), to a CRIF banquet on 25 January 2003, and given prominence by a 27/28 January 2003 newspaper article in Le Monde. Cukierman used the French term "alliance brun-vert-rouge" to describe the antisemitic alignment supposedly shared by "an extreme right nostalgic for racial hierarchies" (symbolized by the colour brown in reference to the Sturmabteilung), "an extreme left [which is] anti-globalist, anti-capitalist, anti-American [and] anti-Zionist" (red), and followers of José Bové (green). In the United States, a similar alliance of disparate groups occurred in opposition to the World Trade Organization in the alter-globalization movement, which saw trade unions, neo-Luddite environmentalists, and paleoconservative nationalists like Pat Buchanan joining a common cause. Many were surprised by leftist Lenora Fulani's support for Buchanan, which has been viewed as an example of a red–green–brown alliance.

== Similar terms ==
=== In Russia ===
The red–brown term (Russian: красно-коричневые, krasno-korichnevye) originated in post-Soviet Russia to describe an alliance of communists and far-right (nationalist, fascist, monarchist, and religious) opposition to the liberal, pro-capitalist Russian government in the 1990s, opposing economic and social reforms such as rapid transition to a market economy through shock therapy, subsequent sharp increase in poverty and drop in living standards, and removal of many restrictions on people's behaviour. Such an alliance was first suggested by Aleksandr Dugin, an early member of the National Bolshevik Party and writer of the new Communist Party of the Russian Federation (CPRF) program. As leader of the opposition, Gennady Zyuganov oversaw the partnership of the CPRF with Russian National Unity, a prominent Russian neo-Nazi party.

As described by American geography lecturer Alexander Reid Ross in his 2017 Against the Fascist Creep, in the 1990s Zyuganov also formed alliances with the far-right National Republican Party of Russia and the Soyuz Venedov, the latter of which, as described and paraphrased by Reid Ross, "'promotes the worship of pagan gods of the Slavic pantheon' while translating and disseminating German Nazi propaganda in Russian. After Zyuganov publicly proclaimed this new red–brown alliance, there was a noted rise in antisemitism within the CPRF, particularly driven by party official Albert Makashov, who openly called for the expulsion of Jews in Russia and met with David Duke, grand wizard of the Ku Klux Klan.

=== In Germany ===
During the Weimar Republic, the term Querfront emerged in Germany to similarly describe an alliance between the far-left and the far-right ("red-brown"). In modern German discourse, the term is either used for minor movements that attempt to bridge the divide of left and right in a populist strategy to unite forces in an effort to gain power or as a descriptor of media and groups typically viewed as far-right that take on more traditionally left-wing positions such as explicit anti-capitalism and anti-imperialism. An example for the former is the activities of the National Bolshevik Michael Koth, while an example of the latter is the magazine Compact. The modern usage of the term has been criticized by historians as not accurate to the original Weimar-era usage.

== See also ==
- Alain Soral
- Antisemitism in the Arab world
- Ba'athism
- Beefsteak Nazi
- Carlos the Jackal
- CRINK
- Ecofascism
- Euston Manifesto
- Falangism
- Hamas
- Horseshoe theory
- Islam and antisemitism § Islamic antisemitism in Europe
- Islamic nationalism
- Islamic socialism
- Islamofascism
- Islamo-leftism
- Molotov–Ribbentrop Pact
- Nasakom
- National-anarchism
- National Bolshevism
- National communism
- National syndicalism
- Neo-Ottomanism
- Neo-Sovietism
- Red fascism
- Red–green alliance
- Regressive left
- Relations between Nazi Germany and the Arab world
- Strasserism
- Syncretic politics
- Tankie
- The Fourth Political Theory
- Third Position
- The Enemy of My Enemy (Michael book)
- White jihad
