= National Bolshevism =

Syncretic political ideology

National Bolshevism, (Note: Russian: национал-большевизм, romanized: natsional-bol'shevizm; German: Nationalbolschewismus.) whose supporters are known as National Bolsheviks (Note: Russian: национал-большевики, romanized: natsional-bol'sheviki; German: Nationalbolschewisten.) and colloquially as Nazbols, (Note: Russian: нацбо́лы, romanized: natsbóly.) is a syncretic political movement committed to combining ultranationalism and Bolshevik communism. The movement first emerged in Germany following World War I, where figures such as Ernst Niekisch and Karl Otto Paetel advocated for a synthesis of radical nationalism and Soviet socialism to oppose Western liberalism and the Treaty of Versailles. This German current, often associated with the Weimar Republic's Conservative Revolution, sought a revolutionary "third way" that rejected capitalism in favour of a state-driven, nationalist collective.

In Russia, National Bolshevism appeared during the Civil War through the Smenovekhovtsy movement, which viewed the Soviet state as the primary vehicle for restoring Russian national power. While many early proponents were later purged under Joseph Stalin, the ideology influenced the revival of state nationalism in the 1930s. In the post-Soviet period, the movement was eponymously revitalized by the National Bolshevik Party, founded by Eduard Limonov and Aleksandr Dugin, which had little in common with the original "National Bolsheviks", and combined radical anti-establishment politics with Eurasianism.

== History and origins ==
=== In Germany ===
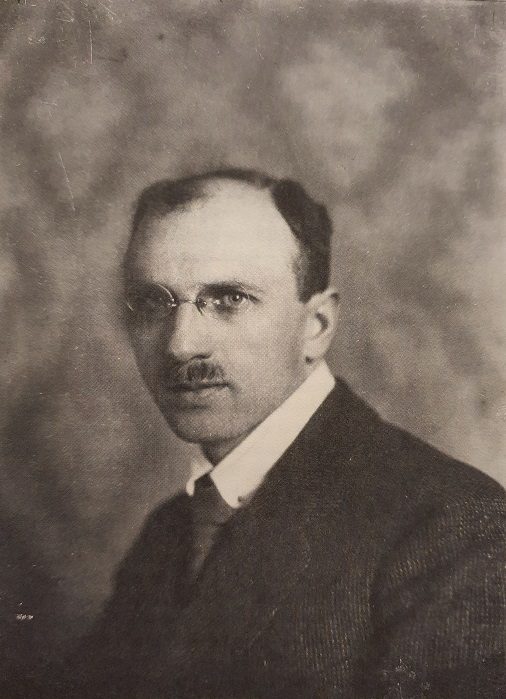
Ernst Niekisch supported an alliance with the Soviet Union to overturn capitalism, arguing for a union of all anti-liberal forces in Germany against the status quo.

National Bolshevism as a term was first used to describe a faction in the Communist Party of Germany (KPD) and later the Communist Workers' Party of Germany (KAPD) which wanted to ally the insurgent communist movement with dissident nationalist groups in the German army who rejected the Treaty of Versailles. Heinrich Laufenberg and Fritz Wolffheim led the faction and it was primarily based in Hamburg. They were subsequently expelled from the KAPD which Karl Radek justified by stating that it was necessary for the KAPD to be welcomed into the Third Congress of the Third International, although the expulsion would likely have happened regardless as Radek previously dismissed the pair as "National Bolsheviks" (which was the first recorded use of the term).

National Bolshevism was among several early ultranationalist, and according to some fascist, movements in Germany that predate Adolf Hitler's Nazi Party. During the 1920s, a number of German intellectuals began a dialogue which created a synthesis between radical nationalism (typically referencing Prussianism) and Bolshevism as it existed in the Soviet Union. The pro-Soviet syncretic Society for the Study of the Soviet Planned Economy (ARPLAN) was founded in Germany in 1932, and contained both far-left and far-right radicals. ARPLAN's membership was very heterogenous: Niekisch was an active ARPLAN member, as was the Nazi politician Ernst Graf zu Reventlow.

After Hitler's rise to power in 1933 and subsequent seizure of control by the Nazis, rival ideological currents such as the Conservative Revolution, National Revolution and National Bolshevism weren't completely eradicated, but operated within the state, engaging in a continual —though ultimately unsuccessful— struggle to supplant the dominant National Socialist doctrine of the NSDAP. Following the collapse of the Nazi regime after the war, these tendencies reemerged within the German Right and eventually took a broader European significance, serving as the intellectual foundations for subsequent nationalist movements.

==== Ernst Niekisch and 'Widerstand' ====
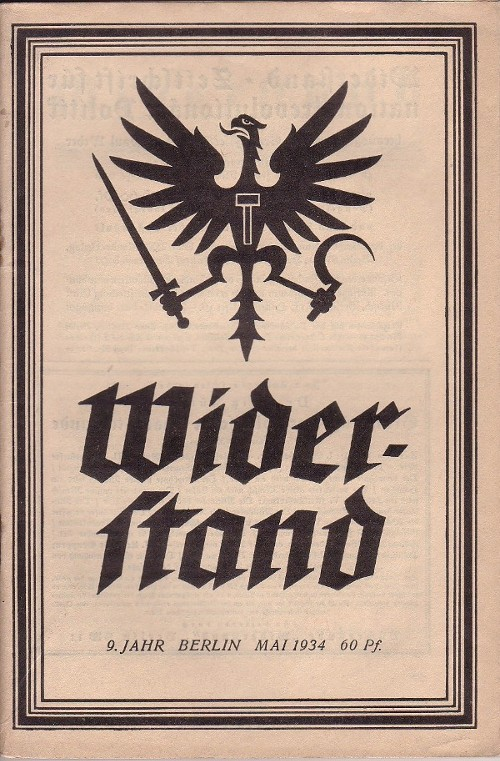
Ernst Niekisch's Widerstand journal featuring the original National Bolshevik eagle symbol

One of the early and most prominent pioneers of the National Bolshevik movement in Germany was Ernst Niekisch of the Old Social Democratic Party of Germany. Niekisch was the founder and primary editor of Widerstand, a magazine which advocated for National Bolshevik ideology. Co-publisher and illustrator of Widerstand was the openly antisemitic A. Paul Weber, who saw himself primarily concerned with the future of Germany due to the growing popularity of Nazism. Other authors of the magazine included Otto Petras, Friedrich Georg Jünger, Hugo Fischer, Hans Bäcker, Friedrich Reck-Mellecze, and Alexander Mitscherlich.

The ideology of Ernst Niekisch and the group which had formed around the publication, named Widerstandskreis, has been described as anti-democratic, nationalist, anti-capitalist, anti-western, as well as exhibiting racist and fascist traits. Others have called his ideology outright fascist, despite Niekisch condemning and critiquing fascism, primarily in his work "Hitler - ein deutsches Verhängnis".

Niekisch strongly and publicly condemned Adolf Hitler, who he perceived as a democratic demagogue that lacked any actual socialism, he claimed and criticized that Hitler, after release from prison, started to look more towards Italian Fascism for inspiration, rather than Ludendorff. After the Nazis took power, Niekisch organised a national revolutionary resistance, for which he was sentenced to life imprisonment until being released in 1945 by the Red Army. Upon his release from prison, Niekisch started a political career in East Germany, which was abruptly ended after the crushing of the 1953 uprising, which resulted in him leaving the party and retiring from politics. Following his retirement, Niekisch moved back to West Berlin and proclaimed himself a 'victim of fascism' due to being blinded while imprisoned, after a long legal battle with West German courts, Niekisch received minor compensation from the Berlin government. Niekisch died in 1967.

In modern times, Niekisch and his works have been cited and praised by both neo-fascists, in particular the Autonomous Nationalists, and some elements of the West German far-left. Aleksandr Dugin also referenced Niekisch in his book The Fourth Political Theory in relation to Eurasianism.

==== Karl Otto Paetel ====
Logo used by Karl Otto Paetel and his Group of Social Revolutionary Nationalists

Another prominent National Bolshevik was Karl Otto Paetel, notable for writing the National Bolshevist Manifesto (published 1933), in which he bases himself on Marxism.

Originally a figure in the German Youth Movement, and later the KPD, Paetel founded the Arbeitsring junge Front, and later the Group of Social-Revolutionary Nationalists (GRSN), which sought to bring together radicals of left and right in pursuit of a "third way" between the NSDAP and the KPD, encompassing both nationalism and socialist economics.

The GRSN, founded in 1930, was a direct response to the challenge posed by the rise in popularity of the Nazis. While initially somewhat receptive to Nazism, Paetel quickly grew disillusioned with the NSDAP as he no longer believed they were genuinely committed to either revolutionary activity or socialist economics. Similarly to the Communists and Strasserists, Paetel too, tried to split off vulnerable elements of the Nazi Party; an example of this being his largely unsuccessful attempt to win over a section of the Hitler Youth to his cause. Paetel would later strongly condemn both Nazism and all other forms of fascism in the National Bolshevist Manifesto.

Similarly to the National Bolshevism of Niekisch, Paetel's ideology was strongly anti-western, focusing on anti-imperialism and opposition to the Treaty of Versailles, as well as being characterized by an Anti-French sentiment. Paetel's National Bolshevism advocated for soviet democracy, while also emphasizing a strong nationalism, including a return to paganism, and believing that the nation is a prerequisite for building socialism.

Following Hitler's rise to power, Paetel fled Germany, initially to Paris and later New York, where he would die in 1975.

==== Strasserism ====
The National Bolshevik project of figures such as Niekisch and Paetel was typically presented as just another strand of Bolshevism by the Nazi Party, and was thus viewed just as negatively and as part of a "Jewish conspiracy". After Hitler's rise to power, many National Bolsheviks were arrested and imprisoned or fled the country.

Despite opposition to National Bolshevism, usually on the grounds that it tends to take Marxist influence, a similarly syncretic, but non-Marxist, tendency had developed in the left wing of the Nazi Party. This was represented by what has now come to be known as Strasserism. Initially one of the stronger factions of the NSDAP, the left-wing slowly started to lose power to Adolf Hitler's faction; this culminated in much of the wing splitting off to form the Black Front, whereas the rest would be purged in the Night of the Long Knives.

Prominent figures of this movement were the brothers Gregor and Otto Strasser, after which the movement was later named, as well as Walther Stennes, Hermann Ehrhardt, and Ernst Röhm.

=== In Russia ===
==== Russian Civil War ====
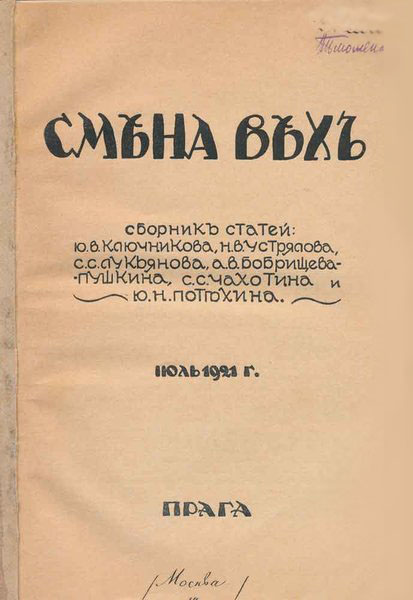
Cover of the magazine Smena Vekh from July 1921

As the Russian Civil War dragged on, a number of prominent Whites switched to the Bolshevik side because they saw it as the only hope for restoring greatness to Russia. Amongst these was Professor Nikolai Ustryalov, initially an anti-communist, who came to believe that Bolshevism could be modified to serve nationalistic purposes. His followers, the Smenovekhovtsy (named after a series of articles he published in 1921) Smena vekh (Russian: change of milestones), came to regard themselves as National Bolsheviks, borrowing the term from Niekisch.

Similar ideas were expressed by the Evraziitsi movement and writers such as D. S. Mirsky, and the pro-monarchist Mladorossi. Joseph Stalin's idea of socialism in one country was interpreted as a victory by the National Bolsheviks. Vladimir Lenin, who did not use the term National Bolshevism, identified the Smenovekhovtsy as a tendency of the old Constitutional Democratic Party who saw Russian communism as just an evolution in the process of Russian aggrandisement. He further added that they were a class enemy and warned against communists believing them to be allies.

Liberal philosopher Peter Struve, who Ustryalov greatly admired, was initially sympathetic to calling it the most interesting movement to emerge among the emigre community, but soon turned against the movement denouncing it as superficial and a Trojan horse for the Bolshevik regime.

==== Co-option of National Bolshevism ====
Ustryalov and others sympathetic to the Smenovekhovtsy cause, such as Aleksey Nikolayevich Tolstoy and Ilya Ehrenburg, were eventually able to return to the Soviet Union and following the co-option of aspects of nationalism by Stalin and his ideologue Andrei Zhdanov enjoyed membership of the intellectual elite under the designation non-party Bolsheviks. Similarly, B. D. Grekov's National Bolshevik school of historiography, a frequent target under Lenin, was officially recognised and even promoted under Stalin, albeit after accepting the main tenets of Stalinism. It has been argued that National Bolshevism was the main impetus for the revival of nationalism as an official part of state ideology in the 1930s. Many of the original proponents of National Bolshevism, such as Ustryalov and members of the Smenovekhovtsy were suppressed and executed during the Great Purge for "anti-Soviet agitation", espionage and other counter-revolutionary activities.

Russian historian Andrei Savin stated that Stalin's policy shifted away from internationalism towards National Bolshevism a view also shared by David Brandenberger and Evgeny Dobrenko.

==== National Bolshevik Party and The Other Russia ====
Flag of the National Bolshevik Party and Flag of The Other Russia

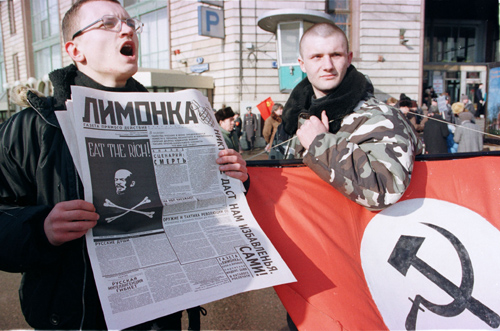
Members of the Russian National Bolshevik Party in 2006

The National Bolshevik Party (NBP) was founded in 1992 as the National Bolshevik Front, an amalgamation of six minor groups.

The party was, throughout its existence, always led by Eduard Limonov. In the end of 1993, after the Russian constitutional crisis, Siberian punk rock icon Yegor Letov, founder and front-man of underground bands such as Grazhdanskaya Oborona and several others—joined Limonov and Aleksandr Dugin in co-founding the National Bolshevik Party and was issued membership card No. 4. Limonov and extreme right-wing ultranationalist activist Aleksandr Dugin sought to unite far-left and far-right radicals on the same platform, with Dugin viewing National Bolsheviks as a point between communist and fascists, who were forced to act in the peripheries of each group. The group's early policies and actions show some alignment and sympathy with radical nationalist groups, albeit while still holding to the tenets of a form of Marxism that Dugin defined as "Marx minus Feuerbach, i. e. minus evolutionism and sometimes appearing inertial humanism", but a split occurred in the 2000s which changed this to an extent. This led to the party moving further left in Russia's political spectrum, and led to members of the party denouncing Dugin and his group as fascists. Dugin subsequently developed close ties to the Kremlin and served as an adviser to senior Russian official Sergey Naryshkin. The NBP was banned and outlawed in 2007 and its members went on to form a new political party in 2010, The Other Russia.

Initially critical of Vladimir Putin, Limonov at first somewhat liberalized the NBP and joined forces with leftist and liberal groups in Garry Kasparov's United Civil Front to fight Putin. However, he later expressed support of Putin following the outbreak of the Russo-Ukrainian War. Limonov died in March 2020 and his The Other Russia party re-organized and renamed itself to "The Other Russia of E. V. Limonov" to honor its founder.

==== Aleksandr Solzhenitsyn ====
The term National Bolshevism has sometimes been applied to Aleksandr Solzhenitsyn and his brand of anti-communism. However, Geoffrey Hosking argues in his History of the Soviet Union that Solzhenitsyn cannot be labelled a National Bolshevik since he was thoroughly anti-Stalinist and wished a revival of Russian culture that would see a greater role for the Russian Orthodox Church, a withdrawal of Russia from its role overseas and a state of international isolationism. Solzhenitsyn and his followers, known as vozrozhdentsy (revivalists), differed from the National Bolsheviks, who were not religious in tone (although not completely hostile to religion) and who felt that involvement overseas was important for the prestige and power of Russia.

There was open hostility between Solzhenitsyn and Eduard Limonov, the head of Russia's unregistered National Bolshevik Party. Solzhenitsyn had described Limonov as "a little insect who writes pornography" and Limonov described Solzhenitsyn as a traitor to his homeland who contributed to the downfall of the Soviet Union. In The Oak and the Calf, Solzhenitsyn openly attacked the notions that the Russians were "the noblest in the world" and that "tsarism and Bolshevism [...] [were] equally irreproachable", defining this as the core of the National Bolshevism to which he was opposed.

==== Eurasianism Movement ====
The Eurasia Movement is a National Bolshevik Russian political movement founded in 2001 by the political scientist Aleksandr Dugin.

The organization follows the neo-Eurasian ideology, which adopts an eclectic mixture of Russian patriotism, Orthodox faith, anti-modernism, and even some Bolshevik ideas. The organization opposes "American" values such as liberalism, capitalism, and modernism.

=== In other countries ===
==== Argentina ====
The Tacuara Nationalist Movement was a neo-Nazi urban guerilla group in Argentina that developed a communist faction within itself. It has been rumored that the organization was secretly run by the son of Adolf Eichmann. In 1962 it was also described by ADL as "neo-Nazi storm troop gang", especially after the notorious June 1962 attack on Graciela Sirota, tattooing on her breast a Nazi swastika, as revenge for bringing Adolf Eichmann to justice in Israel. In 1965, the Argentine National Congress classified Tacuara as a communist rather than a fascist organisation. Tacuara had always been sympathetic to the national-syndicalism of Ramiro Ledesma Ramos, furthermore, many activists struggled alongside the trade unions.

==== Australia ====
National Bolshevism as an ideology was introduced within the Australian far-right scene during the 1980s by Alec Norwick, under his pen name Alec Saunders, by writing in 1984 The Social Revolutionary Nature Of Australian Nationalism. German non-Nazi national-revolutionary currents, such as National Bolshevism and the ideology of the Conservative Revolutionaries, were introduced to Australian readers as a justificaction for anti-Americanism and Russophilia, and as critique against liberal-western cosmopolitanism.

==== In Finland and Karelia ====
The patriotism of the working class is profoundly progressive and revolutionary...By overthrowing the rule of the exploiting classes the working class creates the conditions for the fullest possible manifestation of its patriotism, for it itself is the true bearer of patriotism in our time...This does not in any way mean, however, that while belonging to the single international army of working people, the worker ceases to be a Frenchman, Englishman, etc...the building of socialism, can bring every nation real freedom, independence and national greatness. It follows that the most internationalist class - the working class - is at the same time the most patriotic class."

— Otto Wille Kuusinen, "Cosmopolitanism, not patriotism, is the ideology of the imperialist bourgeoisie."

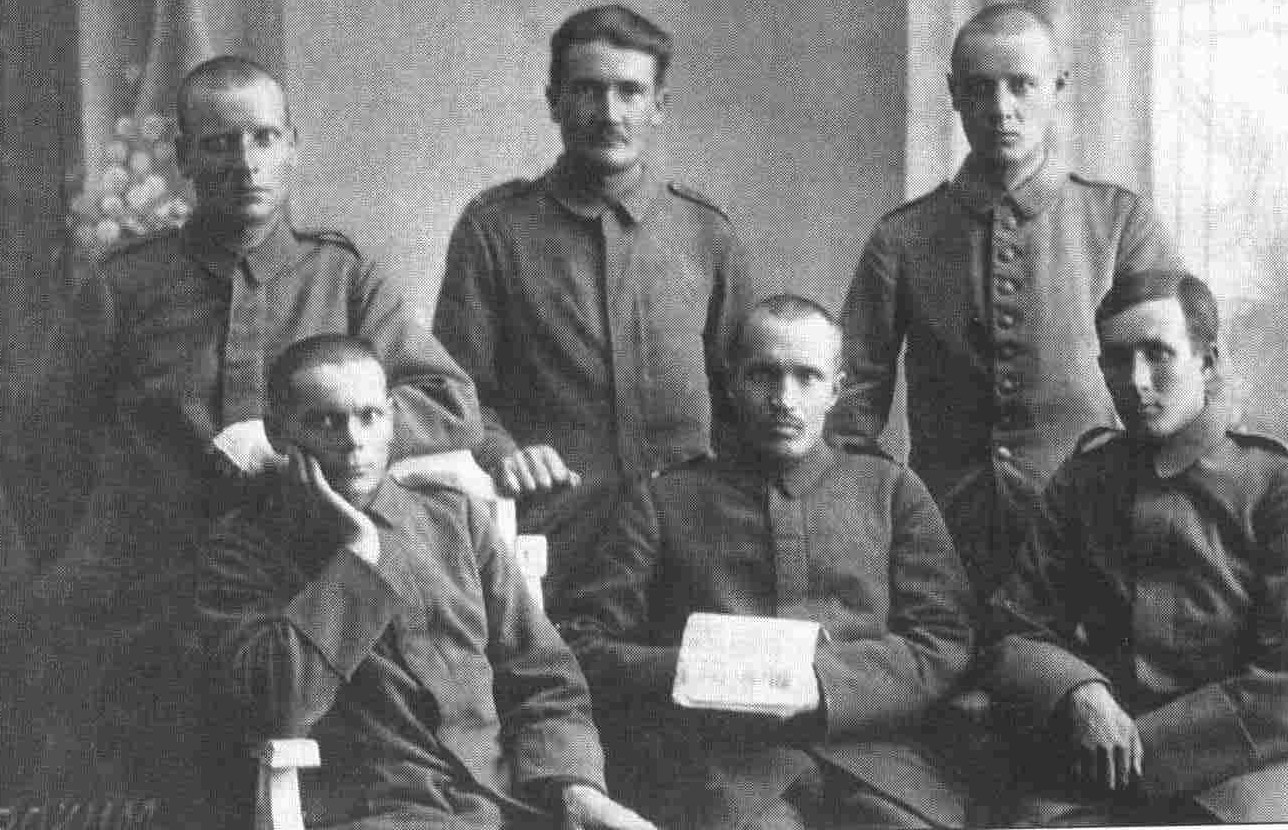
Members of the Executive Committee of Worker-Jägers

Before the independence of Finland, Finnish nationalists sent volunteers to the German army, who were organized into the 27th Jäger Battalion. They were supposed to act as the revolutionary vanguard who would incite a revolution in Finland against the Russian Imperial government. When the Finnish Civil War started, most sided with the White Army but approximately a third sided with the communists. The so-called "Red jägers" were left-wing working class jägers who formed the executive committee of Worker-Jägers that maintained contacts with left-wing revolutionaries back home and in Germany. Influential politicians of the labor movement at the time, K. H. Wiik, Oskari Tokoi and Yrjö Mäkelin, among others, supported the Jäger movement. The son of the latter, Leo Mäkelin, joined the ranks of the Jägers on February 14, 1916.

During the Civil War of 1918, the Finnish People's Delegation of the Finnish Socialist Workers' Republic promoted the idea of a "Red Greater Finland". According to Professor of Scandinavian Studies Witold Maciejewski, the Finnish irredentism and expansionism promoted by Finnish communists reflected "a general shift towards National Bolshevism".

Edvard Gylling, Commissar of Finance for the Revolutionary "Red" Finnish government and later Chairman of the Karelian ASSR implemented a policy to increase the economic independence and to Finnicize Karelian population. According to Gylling, the successful construction of socialism in Karelia required "the implementation of nationalist politics in a communist spirit", which would win the support of the anti-Russian peasant population. Among his nationalist policies was the Finnicization of the Karelians, because the ultimate goal was the unification of the region with Finland. He believed that the autonomous Finnish-speaking Soviet Karelia could act as a springboard from which the revolution could spread to Finland and Scandinavia. His vision was to create a "Scandinavian Socialist Federal Republic" or "red Greater Finland" separate from Russia, which would also include Eastern Karelia.

However, to Gylling's chagrin, the borders of Soviet Karelia were drawn in 1924 in such a way that Russians made up more than half of its population, while Karelians and Finns remained a minority. The Finnish language was made one of the official languages of the republic and efforts were made to make it even the main language. School language was changed to Finnish, in some places against the will of the local population. During Gylling's time, Finnish workers from Canada and the United States were also systematically enticed to Soviet Karelia, from which several thousands would be recruited during the Great Depression. Andrei Zhdanov, the leader of the Leningrad party committee, framed the formation of the Karelo-Finnish SSR as unification of two kindred peoples: "The Finnish and Karelian people are tied with each other by blood racial-national glues. (Note: Russian: krovnymi rasovo-natsional’nymi uzami) The reorganization of the Karelian Autonomous Republic in the Karelo-Finnish Union Republic will realize further economic and cultural development of these two kindred people and strengthening of their brotherly friendly cooperation".

Iivo Ahava was a prominent Karelian nationalist who was a leading figure in the local Red Guards. Yrjö Ruutu, the founder and leader of the interwar Strasserist National Socialist Union of Finland, joined the communist Finnish People's Democratic League after the Second World War. After the war, the leader of the Nazi Finnish-Socialist Workers' Party Ensio Uoti praised Stalin's "nationalist communism" and applauded him taking a stand against "jewish internationalism and jew-finance capitalism". In the 1950s he was a member of the socialist Radical People's Party that has variously been described as far-left and far-right and was a presidential candidate in 1956 elections. He gained some support and was endorsed by Yleisö newspaper.

==== Francophone countries ====
The Franco-Belgian Parti Communautaire National-Européen shares National Bolshevism's desire for the creation of a united Europe as well as many of the NBP's economic ideas. French political figure Christian Bouchet has also been influenced by the idea. The Nouvelle Droite tendency was influenced by both left-wing and right-wing doctrines, taking heavy inspiration from Antonio Gramsci, with many supporters of the concept calling themselves "Gramscians of the Right". Former GRECE secretary-general Pierre Vial has praised Che Guevara, the Italian Red Brigades and the Red Army Faction for their opposition towards liberal democracy. GRECE's Alain de Benoist stated that the left-right political divide has "lost any operative value to analyze the field of ideological or political discourse", and he himself supported the French Communist Party during 1984 elections to the European Parliament.

The French "National Socialist Proletarian Party" praised "Russo-Aryan USSR" in its newspaper Le Viking.

==== Equatorial Guinea ====
During his early career in the 1960s, Francisco Macías Nguema, who later became President of Equatorial Guinea, referred to himself as a "Hitlerian-Marxist".

==== India ====
In 1944, Indian nationalist leader Subhas Chandra Bose called for "a synthesis between National Socialism and communism" to take root in India. The All India Forward Bloc was formed by Bose in 1939 as a left-wing nationalist and socialist party, and exists to this day, designated by the ECI as a State Party. Subhas Chandra Bose formed also a pro-Nazi military force in a form of a Free India Legion, which was composed of 3,000 POWs captured by Erwin Rommel.

==== Israel ====
After the death of Avraham Stern, the new leadership of the Israeli paramilitary organization Lehi moved towards support for Joseph Stalin and the doctrine of National Bolshevism, which was a break from the group's fascist outlook under its previous leader.

Nathan Yellin-Mor, one of the leaders of Lehi, formulated the group's unique form of Hebrew National Bolshevism.

==== South Africa ====
In the Rand Rebellion in 1922, white Communists and Nationalists sought to establish a white ethnostate in South Africa. Banners with the phrase "Workers of the World, Unite and Fight for a White South Africa!" were carried by the strikers.

==== United States ====
George W. Christians founded the Crusaders for Economic Liberty that supported both fascism and communism. Christians associated with the Ku Klux Klan but still claimed to be "so red the Russian Reds are pale yellow in comparison". He met Roosevelt and told him that he was "only the Kerensky" of an upcoming American "revolution", a moderate who would be overthrown by an American Stalin.

== 21st century ==
=== Czech Republic ===
Communist Party of Bohemia and Moravia leader and incumbent representative of the party in the European Parliament Kateřina Konečná joined the far-right nationalist Patriots for Europe grouping.

=== Denmark ===
Antifascist magazine Searchlight described the former leader of the Danish Nazi Party Povl Riis-Knudsen as National Bolshevik. Riis-Knudsen has written the book National Socialism: A Left Wing Movement which argued Nazis have more in common with communists than with capitalists.

=== Estonia ===
According to the Estonian Foreign Intelligence Service, Vladimir Ilyashevich, a candidate for the communist Left Alliance of Estonia and a former KGB agent, neo-Nazi and leading figure in the Nazi Estonian Independence Party Risto Teinonen, neo-Stalinist author Alexander Duykov and Johan Bäckman who has associated with various far-left and far-right groups, including National Bolsheviks and Eurasianists formed an influential political clique. They were funded by the antisemitic nationalist organization National Patriotic Front "Memory". Prosecutor Heli Sepp alleged Teinonen was organizing neo-Nazi military training camps in Estonia. Bäckman was later involved in a similar venture.

An Estonian neo-Nazi and a member of the Estonian chapter of neo-Nazi Russian National Unity Allan Hantsom ran on the list of the communist Left Alliance of Estonia.

=== Finland ===
In the 2000s, Johan Bäckman is associated with National Bolshevism and Neo-Eurasianism and has been described as Alexander Dugin's liaison in Finland, for whom he has organized speaking tours in the country. Bäckman who has been involved with far-right parties recruiting people for the war in Ukraine was a candidate of the communist Workers' Party of Finland, a splinter group of the Communist Workers' Party. He has also been a member of the far-right pro-Russian Power Belongs to the People and Eurasian National Front. The recruits have then gone on to train in the military camps of the neo-Nazi Russian Imperial Movement. An associate of Bäckman and Janus Putkonen, Russian-Finnish pro-Russian propagandist Kosti Heiskanen was part of a delegation of Finnish communists who joined the Communist Party of Russian Federation in an event in 2026 in Russia and signed a pro-war declaration. Heiskanen has associated with the North Slavic Community and the Volunteer Special Training Center, affiliated with the neo-Nazi Rusich Group.

Communist Party MP Pirkko Turpeinen has associated with the far-right, like Juha Korhonen of the Freedom Alliance. Hannu Rainesto who identifies as a communist and runs a group called the Red Guard has been active in the far-right Finns Party. The ultranationalist Finnish People's Blue-Whites terminated its previous electoral alliance with the neofascist Patriotic People's Movement and neo-Nazi Finland – Fatherland (former Aryan Germanic Brotherhood) for an alliance with the Communist Workers' Party in 2004.

=== Germany ===
By the 1990s, Michael Koth, a supporter of North Korea and its Juche ideology, started associating with National Bolshevism and founded a group, the Workers' Party of Germany (PdAD), which sought to imitate the Workers' Party of Korea and believed that East Germany failed because it "failed on the national question". In 1999, Koth founded the Combat League of German Socialists (KDS) together with multiple German neo-Nazis; as their propagandist, he would run the "Red-brown channel", an online news show. The KDS would dissolve in 2008, which lead Koth to found the Pro-North Korean Anti-Imperialist Plattform (AiP), which he runs to this day. Koth has, among other things, been called "one of the most persistent Querfront activists in the country".

The Autonomous Nationalists have been noted for adopting left-wing issues and aesthetics. Many of them are also influenced by Ernst Niekisch's National Bolshevism and/or Strasserism.

In modern German politics, the term Querfront is often used to refer to movements and ideologies which aim to combine the left and the right. The most notable Querfront newspaper being Compact, which is run by former left-wing activist Jürgen Elsässer. The term has also been used for Manova News and protests against the COVID-19 measures, where both left-wing and right-wing activists sometimes protested together.

Sahra Wagenknecht and her Sahra Wagenknecht Alliance (BSW) political party have been accused of both a Querfront strategy and outright National Bolshevism due to their left-conservative outlook.

=== Balkan countries ===
Some have described the Bulgarian Attack party (which considers itself neither left nor right-wing), the Slovenian National Party (position of which is disputed, with the party refusing to set itself on the political spectrum), the Bosnian-Serb Alliance of Independent Social Democrats (which has gradually abandoned its reformist ideology for a more assertive advocacy of Serbian nationalism), the Macedonian Levica (which was described with many terms, including fascist) and the Greater Romania Party (that expressed nostalgia for both Axis-aligned dictatorship of Ion Antonescu and the communist regime of Ceaușescu) as "National Bolshevik" for often seen blending of left-wing and right-wing political viewpoints, including irredentism, interventionism and anti-globalist approach to foreign policy.

=== Hungary ===
At the time Hungary's best organized and largest paramilitary group, the neo-Nazi Hungarian National Front (originally Hungarian National Socialist Action Group) grew increasingly close to the communist Hungarian Workers' Party, and promoted North Korea, Dugin and National Bolshevism on its website. National Front also published Új Rend magazine that republished material by the NSDAP/AO. The group's leader István Győrkös described the ideology of the group as "neo-Hungarist" and "popular socialist".

=== Russia ===
The Other Russia of E. V. Limonov and its militant wing, the Interbrigades, continue to exist in modern Russia.

According to Bellingcat, modern Russian National Bolshevik groups like Community Movement, Russian Socialism and Young Russian Socialist Avantgarde have been influenced by the fascist network Iron March. They post references to Iron March founder Alexander Slavros and share "Atomwaffen-style memes".

=== Sweden ===
Markus Allard is the former chairman of the Örebro section of the communist Youth Left but went on to found the nationalist and anti-immigrant Örebro Party. Malmölistan is a splinter group of the Swedish Communist Party, led by Nils Littorin, but is also nationalist and anti-immigrant. Both secured representation in the 2026 Swedish local elections.

=== United States ===
In July 2021, Matthew Heimbach, the leader of the now defunct neo-Nazi Traditionalist Worker Party, announced his intention to reform the party along National Bolshevik lines.

=== Ukraine ===
The Progressive Socialist Party of Ukraine, which has been described as a National Bolshevik political party, was banned on March 20, 2022.

== See also ==
- Ba'athism
- Beefsteak Nazi
- Black Front
- Christian communism
- Crusade of Romanianism
- Endokomuna
- Eurasianism
- Falangism
- Grazhdanskaya Oborona
- Islamism
- Islamofascism
- Islamic socialism
- Juche
- Kommunizm (band)
- Lehi (militant group)
- Mladorossy
- Nasakom
- National-anarchism
- National Bolshevik Front
- National syndicalism
- Nazi-Maoism
- Neo-Ottomanism
- Neo-fascism
- Neosocialism
- Neo-Sovietism
- Neo-Stalinism
- Nouvelle Droite
- Neue Slowenische Kunst
- Querfront
- Rashism
- Red fascism
- Red–green–brown alliance
- Russian nationalism
- Sorelianism
- Strasserism
- Syncretic politics
- Tankie
- Third Position
