= Pact of Pacification =

1921 Italian pact between Benito Mussolini and socialists

The Pact of Pacification or Pacification Pact was a peace agreement officially signed by Benito Mussolini, who would later become dictator of Italy, and other leaders of the Fasci with the Italian Socialist Party (PSI) and the General Confederation of Labor (CGL) in Rome on August 2 or 3, 1921. The Pact called for “immediate action to put an end to the threats, assaults, reprisals, acts of vengeance, and personal violence of any description,” by either side for the “mutual respect” of “all economic organizations.” The Italian Futurists, Syndicalists and others favored Mussolini’s peace pact as an attempt at “reconciliation with the Socialists.” Others saw it as a means to form a "grand coalition of new mass parties" to "overthrow the liberal systems" via Parliament or civil society.

In the accord, Mussolini clearly voiced his opposition and contempt for the provincial paramilitary squads and their landowning allies, declaring that they were "the dullest, deafest, most miserable cast that exists in Italy". The agreement was short-lived since many of the action squads leaders denounced the pacification pact with the socialists, along with Mussolini’s leadership, arguing that the Duce "had not created the movement" and that they could "get along without him".

== History ==
The violence between the action squads (squadristi) and socialists and communist activists continued to escalate from 1919 to 1921. Revolutionary socialists were engaged in political assassinations, strikes, physical possession of factories, seizures of private land, and riots who often “coerced smallholders”(farmer owners) “as well as laborers into Socialist unions,” causing rural landowners to launch retaliatory assaults against socialist targets. Across the Italian landscape “trains and barracks, banks and public buildings were attacked by mobs,” while many areas were draped in red banners and were declared to have “passed wholly into the hands of the Communists.” The rural paramilitary leaders took the position that “violence could only be met by greater violence” in a situation that was almost comparable to a civil war. Mussolini found himself under increasing pressure to reduce the anti-socialist violence, finding it difficult to be put in a position to take a “categorically antileftist position,” since he had raised the possibility of forming a sort of “nationalist-leftist coalition government.” By 1921, the fasci movement had expanded to the point where almost every political position in Italy was represented, which was encouraged by Mussolini’s denials that he had “any programme” whatsoever, pointing out that fascism would “appeal simultaneously to ‘aristocrats and democrats, revolutionaries and reactionaries, proletarians and anti-proletarians, pacifists and anti-pacifists.'"

Willing to court almost any populist movement, Mussolini found it politically advantageous at first to identify with the nationalistic movement of independent and loosely organized anti-socialist militias, although at the time he “did not want to lose his position on the left,” since he was considering the possibility of a “Fascist Labor Party” or “National Labor Party.” Mussolini envisioned a “coalition of labor syndicalists,” but the increasing violence between socialist and anti-socialist squads was harming his chances to amass a wider political constituency.

== Caught in the middle ==
During the 1919 elections, the Fascists had attempted to court the socialist-left while publicly dubbing himself the “Lenin of Italy”, attempting to “out-socialist the socialists”, which resulted in an election where the socialists garnished “forty times as many votes.” This devastating and humiliating election defeat pushed Mussolini towards finding other populist movements that could catapult him into a powerful seat of authority, even though he “briefly reconsidered emigrating” in the belief that his movement was finished. The poor state of affairs of the fasci movement was reported by Fascists themselves at their Third Fascist Congress, who calculated that they had “only 100 fasci and 30,000 supporters” in 1920, as compared to “2,200 fasci and 320,000 members by late 1921. In an attempt to expand his minuscule party, Mussolini seemed to have employed the political strategy of entryism in which a smaller political movement aspires to capture a larger one under a degree of subterfuge and subversion.

In a sense, as historian Stanley G. Payne explained, the “new mass Fascism” of the agrarian squadrists “had not been created by Mussolini,” but had instead “sprung up around him.” As Mussolini proceeded to ensnare the mostly self-organizing militias under his fascist banner, his movement began to experience a fast-expanding “influx of middle-class people” who were relatively conservative. Generally, the ras leaders supported nationalism, not socialism, and were upset over the socialists and communist involvement in political violence against landowners and the middle class.

== Reaction to the peace pact ==
After the peace pact was announced, many of the leading ras opposed it, including Dino Grandi, Italo Balbo, Roberto Farinacci, and Pietro Marsich, who refused to recognize the pact, creating a serious split. In the city of Bologna, posters appeared that accused “Mussolini as a traitor to Fascism.” In many Italian cities, including Florence, the local fasci decided to dissolve their local chapter to “protest against the Pact and Mussolini’s leadership.” There were at least two secret anti-Mussolini meetings where a cloud of resentment focused on “Mussolini’s lingering leftist loyalties.” Many leading ras agitated for a leadership change, suggesting that someone else such as Gabriele D’Annunzio should “replace Mussolini.” Grandi and Balbo sought out D’Annunzio in August 1921, and encouraged him to lead the movement in an “insurrectionary march on Rome.” This proposed leadership change appealed to younger fascists who supported “neosyndicalist principles” found in syndicalist Alceste De Ambris’s Carta del Carnaro (Charter of Carnaro), a constitution written for the seized city of Fiume that combined “modern syndicalism” with a “society of producers.” However, D’Annunzio evaded Grandi’s and Balbo’s advances by arguing that he had first to consult the stars of a night sky that was noted as overcast.

== Agrarian Fascism ==
As the representative of “urban fascism”, Mussolini feared the rise of “agrarian fascism” that had originated from the rural squadristi, regarding them as “rival contenders for the leadership of his movement,” whose violence might precipitate a general defeat by policing and military agencies. To remedy the situation, Mussolini challenged the squadristi head-on by signing the peace accord with the socialists in order to put an end to punitive raids and constrain the seemingly uncontrollable squadristi. Considering fascism to be his child, Mussolini wrote that agrarian fascism represented “the private interests of the most sinister and contemptible classes in Italy.” He soon came to the realization that he had overplayed his hand in his attacks against the agrarian fascists, and finding himself in the minority, he resigned his position as the leader of fascism. If fascism was going to represent nothing but reactionary opposition, Mussolini “claimed to be prepared to wash his hands of it.”

== Mussolini’s resignation ==
Although Mussolini resigned as a member of the executive group of the Central Committee on August 18, 1921, his dramatic gesture failed to accomplish his plan. Instead of falling into line, the agrarian ras remained united in their repudiation of the Pact. Mussolini claimed that he would support the peace pact with all his strength, declaring that “If Fascism does not follow me in collaboration with the Socialists, at least no one can force me to follow Fascism.” Within days, another Fascist leader resigned, Cesare Rossi, their deputy-secretary. He was more specific in spelling out his worries, stating that fascism was drifting towards a “pure, authentic and exclusive movement of conservatism and reaction.” Not long after Mussolini tendered his resignation, Fascist National Council rejected his resignation, explaining that all of his potential rivals were “inexperienced.”

== Third Fascist Congress ==
During the Third Fascist Congress in Rome on Nov. 7-10, 1921, members voted to turn the Italian Fasces of Combat to the National Fascist Party (PNF). Weeks before the conclave, Mussolini continued to express his preference for the labeling his political organization the “Fascist Labor Party,” especially if he could get the support of the General Confederation of Labor. Nonetheless, during meetings at the Third Fascist Congress, he was forced to back down, and drop the word “labor” from the party’s name by Grandi and Balbo. As a result of Mussolini’s capitulation, the National Fascist Party would not be based on a coalition of labor syndicates, but on an “association of the fasci and their storm squads.” During congressional sessions, Mussolini agreed under pressure by the provincial chieftains to “disavow” what some called “the Appeasement Pact.” Mussolini finally announced publicly the end of the Pacification Pact in the Il Popolo d'Italia on November 15, 1921.

== See also ==
- Querfront
- Red-green-brown alliance
