= Karl Otto Paetel =

German political journalist (1906–1975)

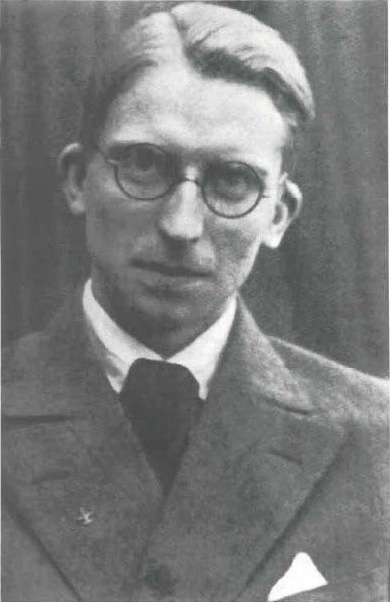
- Photograph of Paetel in the 1930s
- Born: November 23, 1906; Berlin, Kingdom of Prussia, German Empire
- Died: May 4, 1975 (aged 68); New York City, New York, United States
- Organization: Group of Social-Revolutionary Nationalists
- Notable work: The National Bolshevist Manifesto (1933)
- Movement: German Youth Movement; National Bolshevism
- Spouse: Elisabeth Zerner (m. 1943)

Karl Otto Paetel (23 November 1906 – 4 May 1975) was a German political journalist. During the 1920s, he was a prominent exponent of National Bolshevism. During the 1930s, he became a member of the anti-Nazi German resistance.

== Biography ==
Paetel was born on 23 November 1906 in Berlin. He attended the Siemens-Oberrealschule where he got involved in the Köngener Bund youth group. He later studied at the Friedrich-Wilhelm University of Berlin.

Paetel was involved in the German Youth Movement and became a prominent leader in the Deutsche Freischar that formed part of it. He belonged to its "national revolutionary" tendency, which sought to marry elements of both the radical left and the radical right in order to form a third way between the Nazi Party and the Communist Party of Germany. To this end he established his own Arbeitsring Junge Front and subsequently the Group of Social-Revolutionary Nationalists to promulgate his syncretic views. The latter group was established in 1930 due to his disillusionment with the Nazi Party, a group he had hitherto been well disposed towards, as he felt that their revolutionary rhetoric was insincere and that their essential nature was conservative. Nonetheless, he felt that the Nazi Party still contained "useful" revolutionary elements and was particularly active in attempting to win over members of the Hitler Youth to his side. In 1930 he became co-editor of Die Kommenden with prominent nationalist Ernst Jünger.

After escaping from internment by the French police in May 1940, he fled via southern France to Spain, and then to New York. There, he resumed his journalistic activities and worked as a correspondent. In 1943, he married his fiancée Elisabeth Zerner. After the war, he edited the magazine Deutsche Gegenwart and wrote about Jünger. In 1975, he died in Forest Hills, Queens, in New York City.

== Publications ==
- Sozialrevolutionärer Nationalismus, Die Kommenden, 1930
- Das nationalbolschewistische Manifest, Die Sozialistische Nation, 1933; re-published by Haag + Herchen, 2012, ISBN 978-3-89846-673-8
  - Unofficial English translation: The National Bolshevist Manifesto, ARPLAN, 2019
- Ernst Jünger: die Wandlung eines deutschen Dichters und Patrioten, F. Krause, 1946, re-published by Fölbach, 1995, ISBN 978-3-923532-30-8
- Das Bild vom Menschen in der deutschen Jugendführung, Voggenreiter Verlag, 1954
- Jugend in der Entscheidung: 1913, 1933, 1945, Voggenreiter Verlag, 1963
- Versuchung oder Chance?: Zur Geschichte des deutschen Nationalbolschewismus, Musterschmidt-Verlag, 1965
  - Re-published as: Nationalbolschewismus und nationalrevolutionäre Bewegungen in Deutschland, Verlag Bublies, 1997, ISBN 978-3-926584-49-6
- Reise ohne Uhrzeit: Autobiographie, re-published by World of Books, 1982, ISBN 978-3-921333-90-7
- Ein Deutsches Tagebuch, re-published by Peter Lang Publishing, 1995, ISBN 978-0-8204-2551-1

== Bibliography ==
- Timothy S. Brown, Weimar Radicals: Nazis and Communists Between Authenticity and Performance, Berghahn Books, 2009
