= Beefsteak Nazi =

Communists and socialists who joined the Nazi Party

Beefsteak Nazi or "Roast-beef Nazi", was a term used to describe communists and socialists who joined the Nazi Party. Munich-born American historian Konrad Heiden was one of the first to document this phenomenon in his 1936 book Hitler: A Biography, remarking that in the Sturmabteilung (Brownshirts, SA) ranks there were "large numbers of Communists and Social Democrats" and that "many of the storm troops were called 'beefsteaks' – brown outside and red within". The switching of political parties was at times so common that SA men would jest that "in our storm troop there are three Nazis, but we shall soon have spewed them out".

The term was particularly used to designate working class members of the SA who were aligned with Strasserism. The image of these "beefsteak" individuals wearing a brown uniform, whilst having underlying "red" communist and socialist sympathies, implied that their allegiance to Nazism was superficial and opportunistic. After Adolf Hitler became Chancellor of Germany, beefsteak Nazis continued during the suppression of communists and socialists (represented by the Communist Party of Germany and the Social Democratic Party of Germany, respectively) in the 1930s and the term was popular as early as 1933.

== Ernst Röhm and the Sturmabteilung ==
Ernst Röhm, SA co-founder and later commander, developed an "expanding Röhm-cult" within the SA ranks, through which many members sought a revolutionary socialist regime, radicalizing the SA. Röhm and large segments of the Nazi Party supported the 25-point National Socialist Program for its perceived socialist, revolutionary, and anti-capitalist positions, expecting Hitler to fulfill his promises when power was finally attained. In the words of historians D. G. Williamson and Jean-Denis, since Röhm had "considerable sympathy with the more socialist aspects of the Nazi programme", "turncoat Communists and Socialists joined the Nazi Party for a number of years, where they were derisively known as 'Beefsteak Nazis'."

Röhm's radicalization came to the forefront in 1933–1934 when he sought to have his plebeian SA troopers engage in permanent or "second revolution" after Hitler had become Chancellor. With 2.5 million stormtroopers under his command by late 1933, Röhm envisaged a purging of the conservative faction, the "Reaktion" in Germany that would entail more nationalization of industry, "worker control of the means of production", and the "confiscation and redistribution of property and wealth of the upper classes". Such ideological and political infighting within the Nazi Party prompted Hitler to have his political rival Röhm and other Nazi socialist radicals executed on the Night of the Long Knives in the summer of 1934.

Some argued that since most SA members came from working-class families or were unemployed, they were amenable to Marxist-leaning socialism. Historian Thomas Friedrich argues that repeated efforts by the Communist Party of Germany to appeal to the working-class backgrounds of the SA were "doomed to failure" because most SA men were focused on the cult of Hitler and the destruction of the "Marxist enemy".

== Extent ==
In some cities, the number of party-switching beefsteak Nazis was thought to be significant. Rudolf Diels, head of the Gestapo from 1933 to 1934, reported that "70 percent" of new SA recruits had been communists in the city of Berlin. According to German historian Sven Reichardt, the claim made by Diels, as well as others made at the time, was most likely exaggerated. Writing on the various estimates, historian Timothy S. Brown wrote:

Rudolf Diels, the first head of the Gestapo, estimated that in Berlin, 70 percent of new SA recruits after 30 January were former Communists. In some cases, wrote Diels, entire units of the RFB went over to the SA en masse. Peter Longerich has questioned Diels’s frequently cited 70 percent figure as exaggerated, and although he must certainly be right that the figure is too high, he appears himself to have erred in the other direction. According to Diels’s subordinate Gisevius, at least a third of the post-1933 SA was made up of former Communists for whom “the popular phrase… was ‘Beefsteak Nazis’ — Brown on the outside, red inside.’” A leading functionary in the KPD’s Red Sport organization gave a figure of 20 percent. The SA itself gave a figure of 55 percent. Internal SA memoranda, the surviving files of the Gestapo, and reports from the KPD’s own intelligence apparatus all contain evidence of a significant Communist presence in the SA.

== See also ==
- August Winnig
- American Communist Party (2024)
- Crypto-communism
- Ernst Niekisch
- National Bolshevism
- Old Social Democratic Party of Germany
- Widerstand (magazine)
- Paternalistic conservatism
- Sansepolcrismo
- Sorelianism
- Social fascism
- Strasserism
