= Ernst Niekisch =

German National-Bolshevik politician (1889–1967)

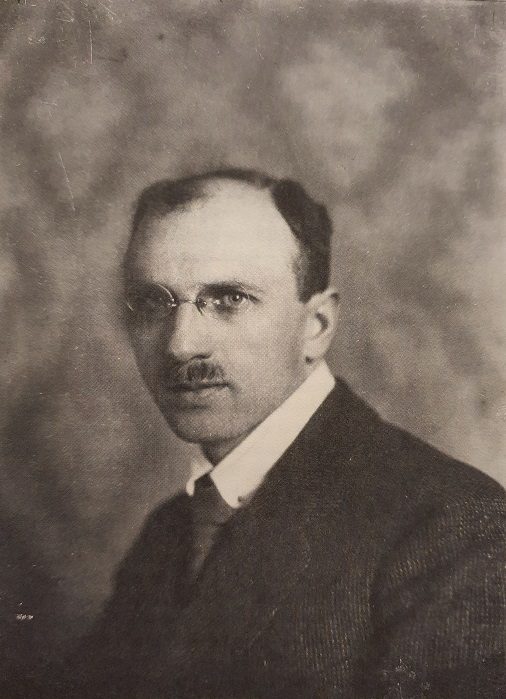
- Portrait, 1926
- Born: 23 May 1889; Trebnitz, Province of Silesia, Kingdom of Prussia, German Empire
- Died: 23 May 1967 (aged 78); West Berlin, West Germany
- Political party: Majority Social Democratic Party of Germany (1917–1919, 1919–1922); Social Democratic Party of Germany (1922–1926); Independent Social Democratic Party of Germany (1919); Old Social Democratic Party of Germany (1926–1932); Communist Party of Germany (1945-1946); Socialist Unity Party of Germany (1946-1953)

Philosophical work
- Era: 20th century philosophy
- Region: Western philosophy
- School: Conservative Revolution
- Main interests: Political philosophy

Ernst Niekisch (23 May 1889 – 23 May 1967) was a German writer and political theorist. Initially a member of the Social Democratic Party (SPD) and of the Old Social Democratic Party of Germany (ASPD), he later became a prominent exponent of the National revolutionary branch of the Conservative Revolution and National Bolshevism.

== Early life ==
Niekisch was born on 23 May 1889 in Trebnitz (Silesia), and brought up in Nördlingen. After studying at a teaching seminar, and completing a one-year voluntary military service with the Bavarian Army, he was appointed a public school teacher in Augsburg. From 1914 to 1917, he served with the Imperial German Army during WWI.

== Political career ==
=== Early years and Bavarian Soviet Republic ===
In 1917, Niekisch joined the Social Democratic Party of Germany (SPD) and was, in 1918, elected as the head of the Augsburg Workers and Soldiers Council, which gave him de facto dictatorial powers over the city and made him instrumental in setting up of a short-lived Bavarian Soviet Republic during 1919. Indeed, for a time at the start of the year, after the resignation of Kurt Eisner and immediately before the establishment of the Bavarian Soviet Republic, Niekisch wielded effective power as chairman of the central executive of Bavarian councils, an interim governing body. After the end of the Soviet Republic in May 1919, Niekisch served two years in prison for his part in the abortive Bavarian coup, being released in August 1921, immediately taking a seat in the Bavarian Landtag that had been awarded to him by the USPD ticket during the 1920 state election. Niekisch soon returned to the SPD however, where he started to stress the importance of nationalism and attempted to turn the SPD in a pro-nationalist direction. He was so vehemently opposed to the Dawes Plan, the Locarno Treaties and the general pacifism of the SPD that he was expelled from the party in 1926.

=== National Bolshevism ===
Upon his expulsion, Niekisch joined the Old Social Democratic Party of Saxony, which he influenced to his own nationalist form of socialism. He launched his own journal, Widerstand (Resistance), and he and his followers adopted the name of "National Bolsheviks" and looked to the Soviet Union as a continuation of both Russian nationalism and the old state of Prussia. The movement took the slogan of "Sparta-Potsdam-Moscow". He was a member of ARPLAN (Association for the Study of Russian Planned Economy) with Ernst Jünger, Georg Lukács, Karl Wittfogel and Friedrich Hielscher, under whose auspices he visited the Soviet Union in 1932. He reacted favourably to Jünger's publication Der Arbeiter, which he saw as a blueprint for a National Bolshevik Germany. He also believed in the necessity of a German-Soviet alliance against the "decadent West" and the Treaty of Versailles. The attempt to combine ultranationalism and communism, two extreme ends of the political spectrum, caused Niekisch's National Bolsheviks to be a force with little support.

=== Under Nazi Germany ===
Although anti-Jewish and in favour of a totalitarian state, Niekisch rejected Adolf Hitler, who he felt would be a disaster for Germany and lacked any real socialism. Niekisch instead looked towards Joseph Stalin and the industrial development of the Soviet Union. Writing in 1958, Niekisch condemned Hitler as a power-obsessed demagogue who was an enemy of the elitist spirit that Niekisch advocated. He additionally claimed and criticized that Hitler, after release from prison, started to look more towards Italian Fascism for inspiration, rather than Ludendorff. Niekisch was particularly ill-disposed towards Joseph Goebbels and, at a meeting between the two facilitated by their mutual friend, Arnolt Bronnen, Niekisch and Goebbels had almost come to blows. Bronnen would break from Niekisch in 1932 after the latter published the pamphlet Hitler – ein deutsches Verhängnis, a vocal critique of Nazism and fascism as a whole, with Bronnen considering the attack on Nazism a personal insult. In the immediate aftermath of the Reichstag fire, his house was searched for evidence of any involvement, but that was not pursued.

Despite his criticisms of Nazism, he was allowed to continue editing Widerstand until the paper was banned in December 1934. He was also allowed to visit Rome in 1935, where he met Benito Mussolini, who told Niekisch that he considered Hitler's aggressive stances towards the Soviet Union to be foolish. Niekisch would later also discuss opposition groups in Nazi Germany with the Italian Consul General while Italo-German relations were somewhat strained.

After the Nazis took power, Niekisch organized a national revolutionary resistance, primarily consisting of writing articles against the regime. Due to his resistance activism, in 1937, Niekisch and dozens of his colleagues were arrested by the Gestapo. In 1939, Niekisch was found guilty of the attempt to form a political party and 'literary high treason by the Volksgerichtshof, along with fellow National Bolsheviks Joseph E. Drexel and Karl Tröger, and sentenced to life in prison. Following the intervention of his former ally, Jünger, Niekisch's family could retain his property, but Jünger was not able secure his release. Niekisch remained in prison until April 1945, where he was partially blinded, when he was liberated by the Red Army.

=== In East Germany and later life ===
After the war, Niekisch turned to orthodox Marxism and started a political career in East Germany. Joining the Communist Party of Germany (KPD) in summer of 1945, Niekisch became a member of the Socialist Unity Party of Germany (SED) upon its formation by merger, helping Otto Grotewohl to write a speech for the occasion. From 1945 to 1948, Niekisch directed the Volkshochschule in Wilmersdorf. Later in 1948, he joined the Kulturbund where he quickly became a leading figure. Starting on 1 April that year, Niekisch lectured in sociology at Humboldt University in East Berlin, later becoming the director of the Institute for the Research of Imperialism. In May 1949, Niekisch becomes part of the German People's Council and later the first Volkskammer of the newly established East Germany. In 1950, he becomes a leading member of the National Front. Later that year however, Niekisch faced criticism for his "objectivism" and is encouraged to retire; Niekisch, however, refused until the state cancelled his seminars and closed his institute at the university in 1951.

As a result of the brutal suppression of the 1953 uprising, only compounded by his previous hardships, Niekisch lost hope in East Germany and laid down all offices in the country, including his SED membership. Following his retirement, Niekisch moved back to West Berlin and proclaimed himself a 'victim of fascism' due to being partially blinded while imprisoned under Nazi rule. After a long legal battle with West German courts, Niekisch received minor compensation from the Berlin government in 1966. Niekisch died on 23 May 1967.

== Legacy ==
After his death, Niekisch was one of a number of writers, including the likes of Oswald Spengler, Arthur Moeller van den Bruck, Vilfredo Pareto and Carl Schmitt, whose works were promulgated by the likes of the Groupement de recherche et d'études pour la civilisation européenne and others involved in the Conservative Revolutionary movement. His works have also been cited and praised by neo-fascists, in particular the Autonomous Nationalists, and some elements of the West German far-left. Aleksandr Dugin also referenced Niekisch in his book The Fourth Political Theory in relation to Eurasianism.

Niekisch is primarily known for his National Bolshevism, having been called a leader in the movement and one of its most prominent as well as earliest supporters.

== Works ==
- Der Weg der deutschen Arbeiterschaft zum Staat. Verlag der Neuen Gesellschaft, Berlin 1925.
- Grundfragen deutscher Außenpolitik. Verlag der Neuen Gesellschaft, Berlin 1925.
- Gedanken über deutsche Politik. Widerstands-Verlag, Dresden 1929.
- Politik und Idee. Widerstands-Verlag Anna Niekisch, Dresden 1929.
- Entscheidung. Widerstands-Verlag, Berlin 1930.
- Der politische Raum deutschen Widerstandes. Widerstands-Verlag, Berlin 1931.
- Hitler – ein deutsches Verhängnis. Drawings by A. Paul Weber. Widerstands-Verlag, Berlin 1932.
- Im Dickicht der Pakte. Widerstands-Verlag, Berlin 1935.
- Die dritte imperiale Figur. Widerstands-Verlag 1935.
- Deutsche Daseinsverfehlung. Aufbau-Verlag Berlin 1946, 3. Edition Fölbach Verlag, Koblenz 1990, ISBN 3-923532-05-9.
- Europäische Bilanz. Rütten & Loening, Potsdam 1951.
- Das Reich der niederen Dämonen. Rowohlt, Hamburg 1953.
- Gewagtes Leben. Begegnungen und Begebnisse. Kiepenheuer & Witsch, Köln und Berlin 1958.
- Die Freunde und der Freund. Joseph E. Drexel zum 70. Geburtstag, 6. Juni 1966., Verlag Nürnberger Presse, Nürnberg 1966.
- Erinnerungen eines deutschen Revolutionärs. Verlag Wissenschaft und Politik, Köln.
  - Volume 1: Gewagtes Leben 1889–1945. 1974, ISBN 3-8046-8485-8.
  - Volume 2: Gegen den Strom 1945–1967. 1974, ISBN 3-8046-8486-6.
