= The Fourth Political Theory =

2009 book by Aleksandr Dugin

- Cover of the 2009 Russian edition
- Author: Aleksandr Dugin
- Original title: Четвёртая политическая теория
- Translator: Mark Sleboda; Michael Millerman
- Language: Russian
- Subject: Political philosophy
- Published: 2009 (Amfora)
- Publication place: Russia
- English publication date: 2012 (Arktos Media)
- Pages: 351 (Russian edn.)
- ISBN: 978-5-367-01089-3

The Fourth Political Theory (Note: Russian: Четвертая политическая теория, romanized: Četvörtaja Političeskaja Těorija.) is a book by the Russian philosopher and political analyst Aleksandr Dugin, first published in 2009. In the book, Dugin states that he is laying the foundations for an entirely new political ideology, the fourth political theory, which integrates and supersedes liberalism, communism, and fascism. In this theory, the main subject of politics is not individualism, class struggle, or nation, but rather Dasein (existence itself).

== Thesis ==
In the book, Dugin states that he wishes to devise an entirely new political theory to replace what he identifies as the previous three dominant political theories: liberalism, fascism and communism. According to Dugin, his aim is to take elements from all three, 'neutralise and decontaminate' negative aspects such as racism, and incorporate them into this new ideology. He refers to this ideology as a 'timeless, non-modern theory' valid for all time.

Dugin views liberalism as having 'defeated all its competitors'. He refers to the derision of the past by liberals and the modern concept of 'progress' as being seriously flawed, describing it as representing a 'moral genocide against the past'. Dugin rejects fascism, criticising Italian fascism for its views on the state and Nazism for its views on racial supremacy.

From the three other political theories, he discards the aspects he finds unacceptable and highlights what he sees as the positive qualities. He combines them to form a new political theory based on the 'ethnos', describing this as 'the greatest value of the Fourth Political Theory as a cultural phenomenon; as a community of language, religious belief, daily life, and of sharing resources and efforts; as an organic entity'.

== Reception ==
Liberal Catholic magazine Commonweal described the book as a "schizoid mixture of the ontology of Martin Heidegger and Gilles Deleuze, postmodern relativism, criticism of liberalism, and geopolitical megalomania".

The Globe and Mail columnist Doug Sanders has cited the book in his insistence that Dugin is "the central figure" in the movement behind Russian policy in events such as the annexation of Crimea to Russia and the war in Donbas; Dugin's work and the neo-Eurasianism englobing it are pointed at in this context by Foreign Policy as well (though this particular book is not named). French philosopher Alain de Benoist asserts a similar dynamic in this conflict.

According to El Confidencial, the book has been influential in far-left and far-right circles in both Russia and the West. Newsweek accused Steve Bannon, White House Chief Strategist and Senior Counselor to President Donald Trump, of having ideological links with Dugin, something that Dugin himself confirmed and was later repeated by The Independent, that noted how Dugin's thought is influencing both Putin and Turkish president Recep Tayyip Erdoğan.

== See also ==
- Eurasia Party
- Foundations of Geopolitics
- National Bolshevism
- Political syncretism
- Third Position
