= Michael Koth =

German Nazbol Juche activist

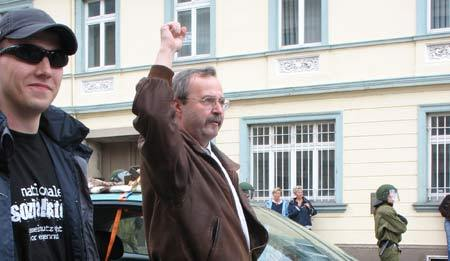
- Koth at a demonstration in 2007

Gausekretär of Berlin/Brandenburg and Spokesperson for the KDS
- In office 1999–2008

Leader of the PdAD
- In office 1995–1998

Member of the central committee of the KPD-Ost
- In office February 1994 – 1996

Leader of the KPD/ML in West Berlin
- In office ? – February 1994

Personal details
- Born: October 16, 1955 (age 71) Steglitz, Berlin
- Party: KDS (1999-2008) PdAD (1995-1998) KPD-Ost (1994-1996) KPD/ML (1979-1994) SEW (1971-1979) FDJ (1969-1974)

Michael Koth (born 16 October 1955) is a German National Bolshevik, supporter of North Korea’s Juche ideology, and advocate for the Querfront political strategy.

He was a member of multiple socialist parties until becoming the leader of the national communist Workers' Party of Germany. Koth later went on to become a founding member of the Kampfbund Deutscher Sozialisten, a German Neo-nazi organisation, which aimed to unite the far-left and far-right through the Querfront strategy.

== Life ==
Koth was born on 16 October 1955 in Berlin-Steglitz, where he grew up as an only child. Koth played football in Realschule and came into contact with the West Berlin section of the FDJ through his friends, which he subsequently joined on 7 October 1969. After his anti-communist parents found out that Koth had joined the GDR-aligned organisation, tensions in the household grew, which ultimately resulted in Koth moving out of his parents' house at the age of 16.

Koth completed his apprenticeship at the Deutsche Reichsbahn (later S-Bahn Berlin), for which he continued to work until being dismissed due to being a member of the far-right KDS in April 2004.

After returning from a business trip with the Deutsche Reichsbahn in Tirana, during which the inner-German border was opened, Koth visited several former high-ranking members of the East German regime, including Erich Honecker, Heinz Keßler, and Erich Mielke. Koth later claimed that he was the last to visit Honecker and his wife before they fled Germany.

== Political career ==
Koth joined the Socialist Unity Party of West Berlin in 1971, where he later met his first wife during an FDJ meeting in 1974. After being expelled from the SEW in 1979, Koth joined the KPD/ML, where he became leader of the West Berlin sector. After the mainline KPD/ML merged with the VSP and GIM in 1986, Koth split his section of the KPD/ML into its own party under the same name, which he claimed to be the legitimate successor of the KPD/ML. This group then joined the KPD-Ost in February 1994, which lead to Koth being admitted into the party's central committee.

After being expelled from the KPD-Ost in the summer of 1995 due to growing connections to nationalist and far-right personalities, which influenced his beliefs, Koth started calling himself a "national communist" and adopted the Juche ideology. Following this, Koth founded the Workers' Party of Germany in 1995 which he ran until its dissolution in 1998. On the 7 February 1998, Koth was invited to the NPD-Party congress in Passau, where his Workers' Party of Germany had an info booth. Koth additionally helped the NPD to get connections to North Korea, such as when, in 1998, Koth's PdAD and a NPD delegation were invited by ambassador Ri San Yu to attended an event hosted by the North Korean Embassy in Berlin. Another NPD-delegation went on a trip to Pyongyang with Koth.

Koth was one of the founding members of the Kampfbund Deutscher Sozialisten, an organisation which aimed to unite the far-left and far-right through the Querfront strategy. With Koth's background in left-wing politics and dedication to anti-imperialism, he became one of the main figureheads for the KDS, which has widely been considered a neo-nazi organisation with few actual leftists to properly execute a Querfront strategy. Koth was proclaimed the leader (Gausekretär) of the Berlin/Brandenburg section of the KDS. Koth was additionally tasked with running the KDS's publications, including both its newspapers and, most prominently, its YouTube channel under the name "Der Rot-Braune Kanal" (The red-brown channel), which he continued to run even after the KDS had dissolved.

After the KDS had dissolved, Koth went on to found the Anti-imperialist Platform (German: Antiimperialistische Plattform), a Juche and pro-North Korea group in Berlin.
