= Juche =

State ideology of North Korea

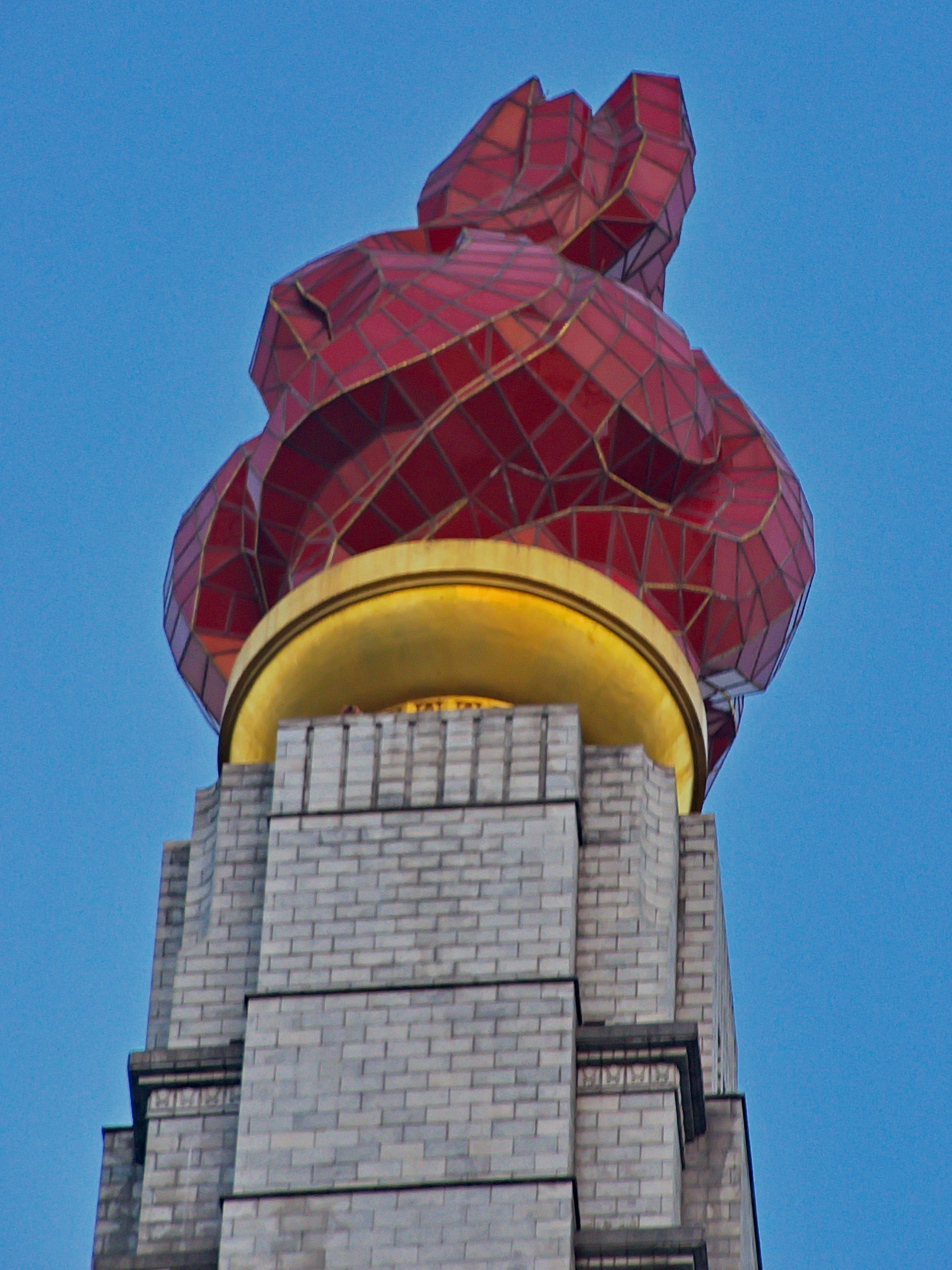
- Torch symbolizing Juche at the top of the Juche Tower in Pyongyang

Juche
- Hangul: 주체사상
- Hanja: 主體思想
- Lit.: Subject idea
- RR: Juche sasang
- MR: Chuch'e sasang

Juche, (Note: /ˈdʒuːtʃeɪ/ JOO-chay; Korean: 주체; RR: Juche; MR: Chuch'e, pronounced [tɕutɕʰe]) officially the Juche idea, (Note: Korean: 주체사상; RR: Juche sasang; MR: Chuch'e sasang) is a name of the official ideology of North Korea and its ruling Workers' Party of Korea (WPK). In the narrow sense, it is the philosophical component of the North Korean official ideology, also known as Kimilsungism–Kimjongilism, which emphasizes human independence, creativity, and consciousness as a motive force.

North Korean sources attribute its conceptualization to Kim Il Sung, the country's founder and first leader. Juche was originally regarded as a variant of Marxism–Leninism until Kim Jong Il, Kim Il Sung's son and successor, declared it a distinct ideology in the 1970s. Kim Jong Il further developed Juche in the 1980s and 1990s by making ideological breaks from Marxism–Leninism while insisting Juche inherits it.

Per official descriptions, Juche means that people are the masters of everything and decide everything. Juche incorporates the historical materialist ideas of Marxism–Leninism but also strongly emphasizes human agency, the role of political consciousness, and the primacy of ideology and propaganda. In politics, Juche emphasizes the nation state, national sovereignty, and strongly defends the role of an individual leader.

Juche posits that a country will prosper once it has become independent by achieving political, economic, and military self-reliance. As Kim Jong Il emerged as Kim Il Sung's likely successor in the 1970s, loyalty to the leader was increasingly emphasized as an essential part of Juche, as expressed in the Ten Principles for the Establishment of a Monolithic Ideological System.

Juche has been variously described by critics as a quasi-religion, a nationalist or fascistic ideology, and a deviation from Marxism–Leninism.

== Etymology ==
Juche comes from the Sino-Japanese word 主體 (shinjitai: 主体), whose Japanese reading is shutai. The word was coined in 1887 to translate the concept of Subjekt in German philosophy (subject, meaning 'the entity perceiving or acting upon an object or environment') into Japanese. The word migrated to the Korean language at around the turn of the century and retained this meaning. Shutai went on to appear in Japanese translations of Karl Marx's writings. North Korean editions of Marx used the word Juche even before the word was attributed to Kim Il Sung in its supposedly novel meaning in 1955.

In contemporary political discourse on North Korea, Juche has a connotation of 'self-reliance', 'autonomy', and 'independence'. It is often defined in opposition to the Korean concept of Sadae, or reliance on the great powers. South Koreans use the word without reference to the North Korean ideology.

The ideology is officially known as Juche sasang (주체사상) in Korean and the Juche idea in English. Juche sasang literally means 'subject idea' and has also been translated less commonly as Juche thought or Jucheism. Adherents of Juche are sometimes referred to as "Jucheists".

== History ==
Official statements by the North Korean government attribute the origin of Juche to Kim Il Sung's experiences in the Down-with-Imperialism Union during Korea's liberation struggle against Japan. However, the first documented reference to Juche as an ideology dates to 1955, when Kim Il Sung delivered a speech titled "On Eliminating Dogmatism and Formalism and Establishing Juche in Ideological Work". The speech promoted a political purge similar to the Yan'an Rectification Movement in China. It became known as the "Juche speech" and is considered one of Kim Il Sung's most important works.

Western scholars generally agree that Hwang Jang-yop, Kim Il Sung's top adviser on philosophy, was responsible for the conceptualization and early development of Juche. Hwang rediscovered the Juche speech sometime in the late 1950s, when Kim Il Sung, having established a cult of personality, sought to develop his own version of Marxism–Leninism and solidify his position in the Workers' Party of Korea (WPK). Hwang expanded upon the meaning of Juche and rewrote Korean communist history to make it appear as though Kim Il Sung had been the WPK's leader since its inception. Andrei Lankov, a Russian scholar of Korean studies, argues that the first reference to Juche as an ideology was on 14 April 1965, when Kim Il Sung gave a speech in Indonesia titled "On Socialist Construction in the Democratic People's Republic of Korea and the South Korean Revolution" (조선민주주의인민공화국에서의사회주의건설과남조선혁명에대하여). Lankov posits that the 1955 speech "used the word in a different meaning" and that Juche was adopted as the "basic ideological principle of North Korean politics" only after the 1965 speech.

On the Juche Idea, the principal work on Juche, was published under Kim Jong Il's name in 1982. In North Korea it serves as "the authoritative and comprehensive explanation of Juche." According to the treatise, the WPK is responsible for educating the masses in the ways of Juche thinking. Juche is inexorably linked with Kim Il Sung and "represents the guiding idea of the Korean revolution". Although Juche is rooted in Marxism–Leninism, it is not merely a creative application of the ideas of Marx and Lenin to Korean conditions. Rather, it is a "new phase of revolutionary theory" and represents "a new era in the development of human history". Kim Jong Il also criticized the Korean communists and nationalists of the 1920s for their "elitist posture", saying they were "divorced from the masses".

The North Korean government issued a decree on 8 July 1997, the third anniversary of the death of Kim Il Sung, declaring the adoption of the Juche calendar. The Central People's Committee promulgated regulations regarding its use in August, and the calendar entered public usage on 9 September, the Day of the Foundation of the Republic. Gregorian calendar dates are used for years before 1912 while years after 1912 (the year of Kim Il Sung's birth) are called "Juche years". The Gregorian year 2026, for example, is "Juche 115" as 2026 − 1911 = 115. When used, "Juche years" are often accompanied by the Gregorian equivalent, i.e. "Juche 115, 2026" or "Juche 115 (2026)".

== Core principles ==
According to Naenara, North Korea's official web portal, Juche at its core means "that the masses of the people are the masters of the revolution and construction and that they are also the motive force of the revolution and construction". The goal of Juche is to establish a self-reliant state that independently determines its political, economic, and military affairs. Kim Il Sung summarized the application of this objective to North Korea in a 1967 speech to the Supreme People's Assembly titled "Let Us Embody the Revolutionary Spirit of Independence, Self-sustenance and Self-defence More Thoroughly in All Fields of State Activity":

First, the government of the republic will implement with all consistency the line of independence, self-sufficiency, and self-defence to consolidate the political independence of the country, build up more solidly the foundations of an independent national economy capable of insuring the complete unification, independence, and prosperity of our nation and increasing the country's defence capabilities, so as to safeguard the security of the fatherland reliably by our own force, by splendidly embodying our party's idea of Juche in all fields.

Political independence (자주; chaju) is a core principle of Juche. Juche stresses equality and mutual respect among nations, and argues that every state has the right to self-determination. Yielding to foreign pressure or intervention would violate the principle of political independence and threaten a country's ability to defend its sovereignty. This is in contrast to sadaejuui (사대주의), which advocates reliance on a great power. However, Juche does not advocate total isolation and encourages cooperation between socialist states. As Kim Jong Il writes in On the Juche Idea: "Independence is not in conflict with internationalism but is the basis of its strengthening". Kim Il Sung acknowledged that it was important for North Korea to learn from other socialist states, in particular the Soviet Union and China, but did not want to follow their examples dogmatically. He said the WPK must "resolutely repudiate the tendency to swallow things of others undigested or imitate them mechanically", attributing North Korea's early success to the WPK's independence in policymaking.

Economic self-sufficiency (자립; charip) is required to achieve political independence, according to adherents of Juche. Kim Il Sung believed that excessive foreign aid threatened a country's ability to develop socialism, which only a state with a strong, independent economy could build. In On the Juche Idea, Kim Jong Il argues that a state can achieve economic self-sufficiency only when it has created an "independent national economy" based on heavy industry, as this sector will drive the rest of the economy. He also emphasizes the importance of technological independence and self-sufficiency in resources, but says that this does not rule out "economic cooperation" between socialist states.

Military self-reliance (자위; chawi) is also crucial for a state to maintain its political independence. To accomplish military self-reliance, states must develop a domestic defence industry to avoid dependence on foreign arms suppliers. Kim Jong Il argued that it was acceptable for socialist states to receive military aid from their allies but that such aid would be effective only if the state was militarily strong in its own right.

== Juche in practice ==
=== Diplomacy ===
North Korea maintained close relations with the Soviet Union and China during the Cold War, having emerged from Soviet occupation and a war it fought alongside Chinese communists. However, North Korea also opposed what it viewed as Soviet and Chinese attempts to interfere in its postwar affairs. For example, a failed challenge to Kim Il Sung's leadership in 1956 led to a purge of pro-Soviet and pro-Chinese elements from the WPK. North Korea rejected the de-Stalinization efforts of Soviet premier Nikita Khrushchev but avoided taking sides during the Sino-Soviet split.

North Korea was admitted to the Non-Aligned Movement in 1975 and has since presented itself as a leader of the Third World, promoting Juche as a model for developing countries to follow.

National survival has been seen as a guiding principle of North Korea's diplomatic strategy. As countries in the Eastern Bloc collapsed and introduced market reforms, North Korea increasingly emphasized Juche in both theory and practice. Even amid economic and political crises, North Korea continues to emphasize its independence on the world stage.

=== Economics ===
After the devastation of the Korean War, North Korea began to rebuild its economy with a base in heavy industry, with the aim to become as self-sufficient as possible. As a result, it developed what has been called the "most autarkic industrial economy in the world". North Korea received economic aid and technical assistance from the Soviet Union and China, but it did not join Comecon, the communist common market. In the 1990s, it had one of the world's lowest rates for dependence on petroleum, using hydroelectric power and coal instead of imported oil. Its textile industry uses vinylon, known as the "Juche fiber", which was invented by a Korean and is made from locally available coal and limestone. The history of vinylon often features in propaganda that preaches the virtues of technological self-reliance. The first domestic homemade CNC machine was introduced in 1995; North Korea had 10,000 CNC machines in 2010, increasing to around 15,000 by 2017.

Commentators have often pointed out the discrepancy between the principle of self-sufficiency and North Korea's dependence on foreign aid, especially during its economic crisis in the 1990s. The pursuit of economic autarky has been blamed for contributing to the crisis. In this view, attempts at self-sufficiency led to inefficiency and to the neglect of export opportunities in industries where there was a comparative advantage.

=== Defence ===
The Korean People's Army is one of the largest on earth and has developed its own nuclear missiles. It produces UDMH fuel for liquid-fueled missiles and Tumansky RD-9 Turbojet engines, which power the Mikoyan-Gurevich MiG-19 and Shenyang J-6. CNC machines produce missiles and centrifuges. North Korea's propaganda since the Korean War has contrasted its military autonomy with the presence of U.S. forces in the South.

== International outreach ==
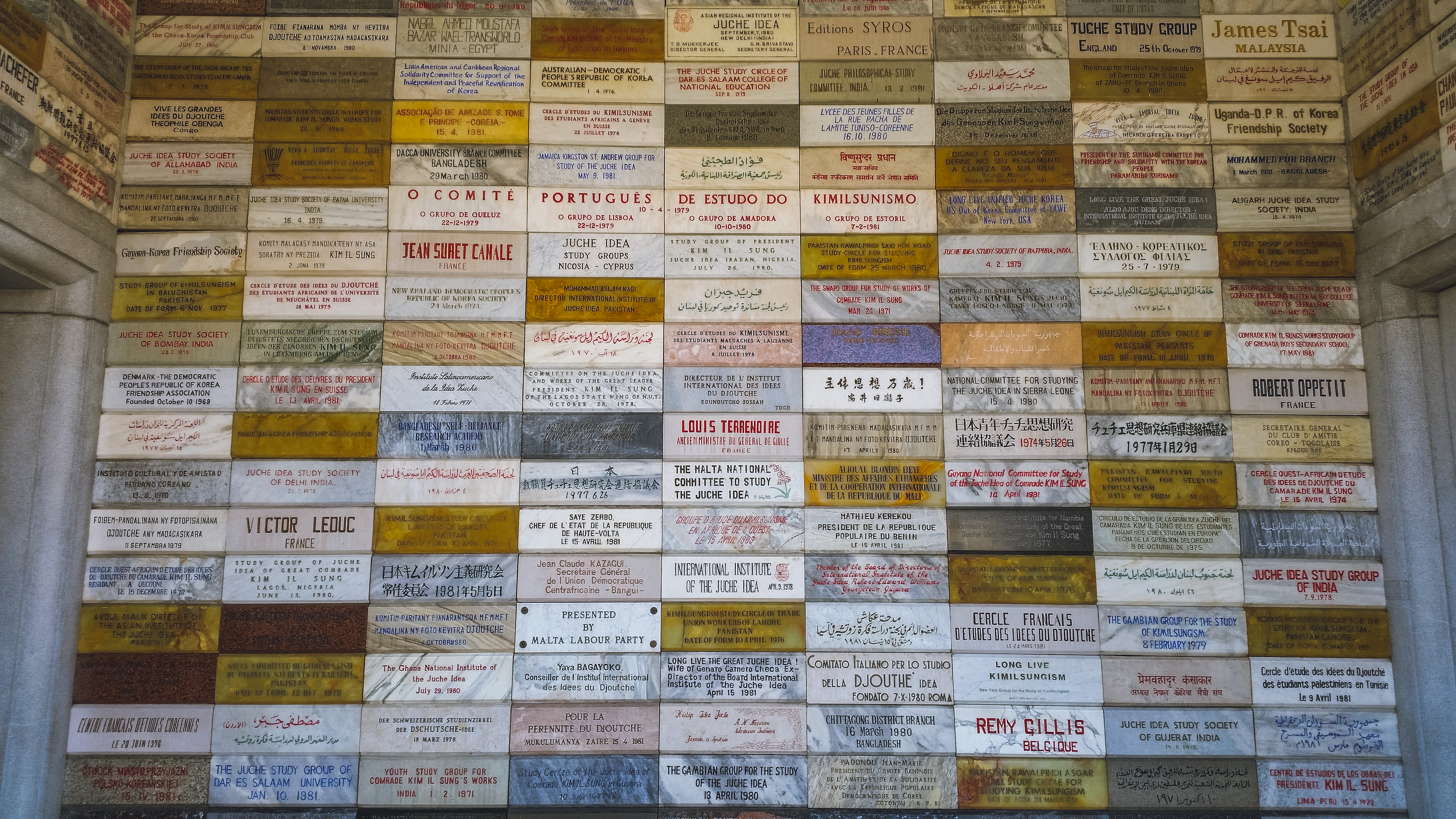
Tribute plaques to Juche from foreign delegates, contained in the interior entrance of the Juche Tower

Kim Il Sung believed that Juche's principles could be applied outside of Korea. He promoted Juche to the Third World as an anti-imperialist ideology and, in particular, the antithesis to U.S. imperialism. Albanian communist leader Enver Hoxha, who was critical of other communist leaders he regarded as having abandoned Marxism–Leninism, described Kim Il Sung's attempts to spread Juche in the Third World as "pretensions" done in collaboration with Titoists, U.S. imperialists, and Soviet and Chinese social imperialists.

North Korea began organizing international seminars on Juche in 1976. The inaugural International Scientific Seminar on the Juche Idea took place in Antananarivo, Madagascar, from 28 to 30 September 1976 under the sponsorship of the Democratic Republic of Madagascar. Many prominent party and government officials, public figures, representatives of revolutionary and progressive organizations, scientists and journalists from more than 50 countries attended. Malagasy president Didier Ratsiraka expressed sympathy and support for North Korea while giving the seminar's opening speech. In 1978, the North Korean government established the International Institute of the Juche Idea (initially the International Juche Research Centre) in Tokyo to supervise international Juche study groups' activities. Tribute plaques from these groups are contained in the Juche Tower in Pyongyang.

A faction within the South Korean student movements of the 1980s embraced Juche as an alternative to the country's political system. It came to be known as the Juche faction or Jusapa (주사파) for short.

Juche has been adopted or studied by a number of far-left and far-right organisations outside of Korea. The Black Panther Party of the United States studied Juche during the 1960s and 1970s. In 2014, the secretary-general of the Nigerian–DPRK Friendship Association Alhassan Mamman Muhammed claimed there were thousands of Juche adherents in Nigeria. The Nepal Workers' and Peasants' Party declared Juche to be its guiding idea in 2016. The Rural People's Party, an affiliate of the neo-Nazi Satanist group Order of Nine Angles, reportedly adheres to Juche and has connections with North Korean officials. The neo-Nazi terrorist organisation Atomwaffen Division also promotes Juche. Notable neo-Nazi leaders supporting North Korea and Juche include Matthew Heimbach and Joshua Sutter. Michael Koth formed the Workers' Party of Germany modeled after the Workers' Party of Korea. Koth was also a leading member in the neo-Nazi Kampfbund Deutscher Sozialisten.

== Related concepts ==
=== Songun ===
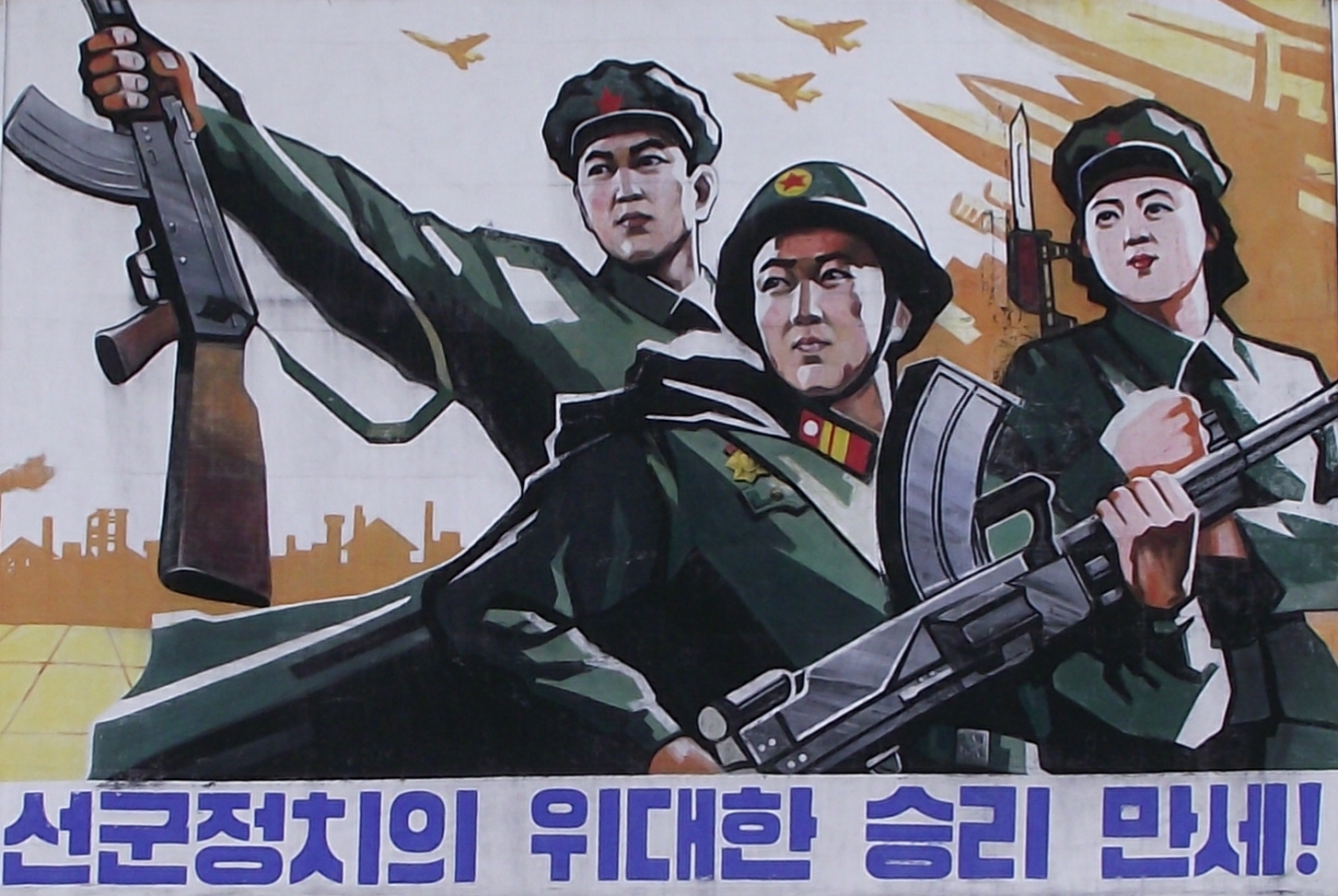
Propaganda art promoting Songun. The Korean text reads, "Long live the great victory of military-first (Songun) politics!"

Songun (선군정치; sŏn'gun chŏngch'i; 'military-first politics') was first mentioned on 7 April 1997 in Rodong Sinmun under the headline "There Is a Victory for Socialism in the Guns and Bombs of the People's Army" (인민군대의 총창우에 사회주의의 승리가 있다). Its description in the article echoed the military-centered thinking of the time: "[Songun is] the revolutionary philosophy to safeguard our own style of socialism under any circumstances". The concept was credited to Kim Jong Il, who posited that Songun was the next stage of development of Juche.

A joint editorial entitled "Our Party's Military-First Politics Will Inevitably Achieve Victory and Will Never Be Defeated" (우리 당의 선군정치는 필승불패이다) was published by Kulloja and Rodong Sinmun (the WPK's theoretical magazine and newspaper, respectively) on 16 June 1999. In it, it was stated that Songun meant "the leadership method under the principle of giving priority to the military and resolving the problems that may occur in the course of revolution and construction as well as establishing the military as the main body of the revolution in the course of achieving the total tasks of socialism". While the article often referred to "our Party", this was not a reference to the WPK but rather to the personal leadership of Kim Jong Il.

The National Defence Commission, the highest military body, was designated the supreme body of the state by a 1998 revision of the North Korean Constitution. The Songun era is considered to have begun with this revision.

In late 2021, Kim Jong Un declared that the "military-first" politics of Songun would be replaced by "people-first politics" (인민대중제일주의) guided by himself.

=== Suryong ===
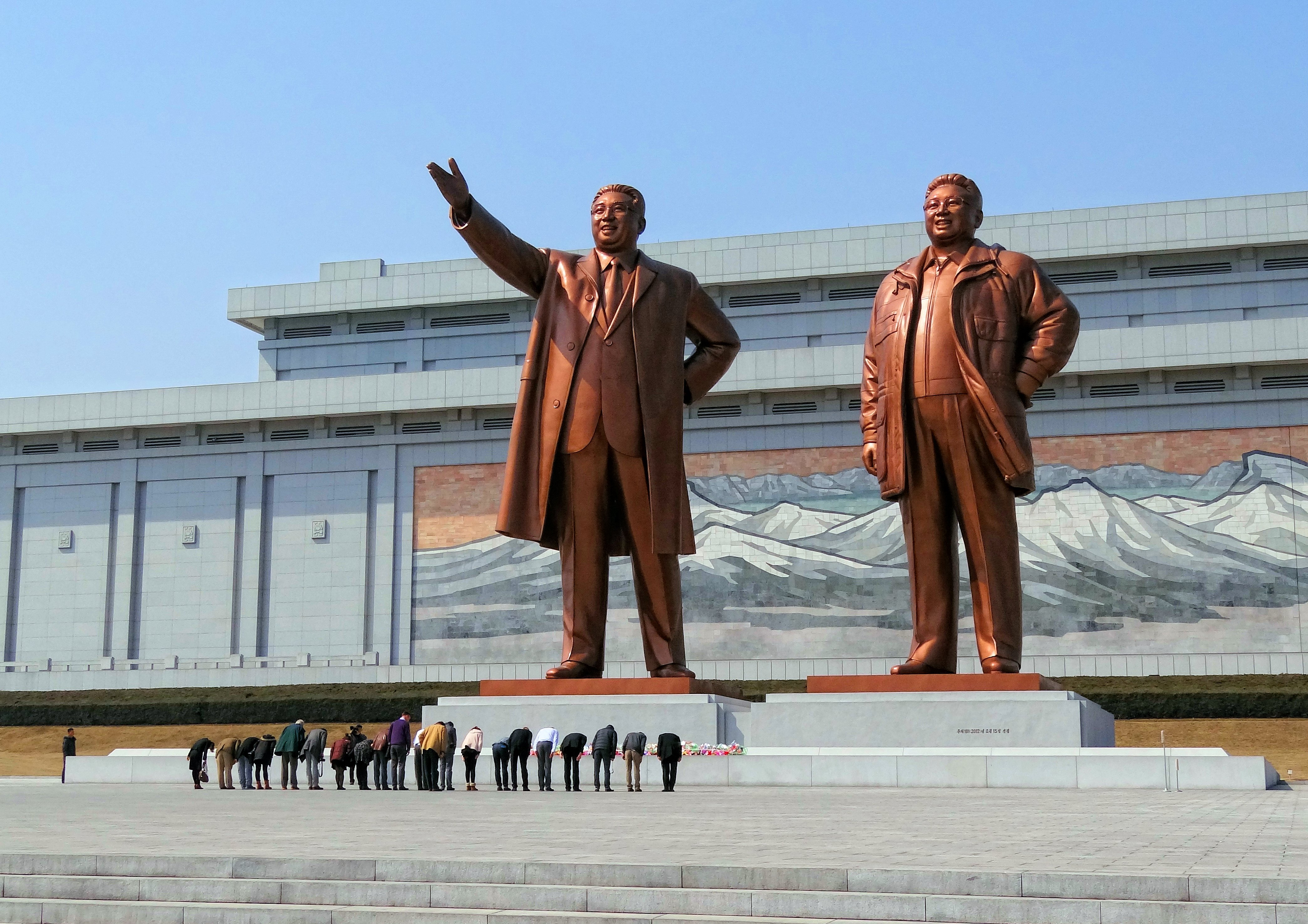
Visitors of the Mansu Hill Grand Monument in Pyongyang bow to massive bronze statues of Kim Il Sung and Kim Jong Il.

Suryong (수령형상창조; suryŏng hyŏngsang ch'angjo; 'creation of the lead figure') is a revolutionary theory concerning the relationship between leadership and society. Unlike Marxism–Leninism, which considers developments in the material conditions of production and exchange as the driving force of historical progress (known as historical materialism), Juche considers human beings in general the driving force in history. It is summarized as "the popular masses are placed in the center of everything, and the leader is the center of the masses". Juche, North Korea maintains, is a "man-centered ideology" in which "man is the master of everything and decides everything". In contrast to Marxism–Leninism, in which a people's decisions are conditioned by their relations to the means of production, Juche argues that people's decisions take consideration of, but are independent from, external factors. Just like Marxism–Leninism, Juche believes history is law-governed, but that it is only man who drives progress, stating that "the popular masses are the drivers of history". The process for the masses to reach consciousness, independence, and creativity requires the "leadership of a great leader". Marxism–Leninism argues that the popular masses will lead (on the basis of their relation to production), but in North Korea the role of a correct leadership is required to organize a unified and effective group. South Korean political scientist Lee Kyo-duk argues that Suryong helped Kim Il Sung establish a unitary system over North Korea.

The theory posits that the leader plays a decisive role as an absolute, supreme leader. The leader is like the brain of the working class, who is the driving force of revolution. The leader is also a flawless human being who never makes mistakes, guiding the masses. The popular masses are the driving force of history, but they require the guidance of the party leadership.

=== Kimilsungism–Kimjongilism ===
At its fourth party conference in April 2012, the Workers' Party of Korea declared itself "the party of Kim Il Sung and Kim Jong Il" and Kimilsungism–Kimjongilism as "the only guiding idea of the party".

Kimilsungism (김일성주의) and the Ten Principles for the Establishment of a Monolithic Ideological System were formally introduced by Kim Jong Il in 1974. Kim Jong Il reportedly did so to strengthen his position within the WPK, taking advantage of his father's political supremacy. Kimilsungism refers to the ideas of Kim Il Sung, while the Ten Principles serve as a guide for North Korean political and social life. Kim Jong Il argued that his father's ideas had evolved and they therefore deserved their own distinct name. North Korean state media had previously described Kim Il Sung's ideas as "contemporary Marxism–Leninism"; by calling them "Kimilsungism", Kim Jong Il sought to elevate the ideas of his father to the same level of prestige as Stalinism and Maoism. Not long after the introduction of "Kimilsungism" into the North Korean lexicon, Kim Jong Il began calling for a "Kimilsungist transformation" of North Korean society.

Political analyst Lim Jae-cheon argues that there is no discernible difference between Kimilsungism and Juche, and that the two terms are interchangeable. However, in his 1976 speech "On Correctly Understanding the Originality of Kimilsungism", Kim Jong Il said that Kimilsungism comprises the "Juche idea and a far-reaching revolutionary theory and leadership method evolved from this idea". He further added, "Kimilsungism is an original idea that cannot be explained within the frameworks of Marxism–Leninism. The Juche idea, which constitutes the quintessence of Kimilsungism, is an idea newly discovered in the history of mankind". He also stated that Marxism–Leninism had become obsolete and needed to be replaced by Kimilsungism:

The revolutionary theory of Kimilsungism is a revolutionary theory which has provided solutions to problems arising in the revolutionary practice in a new age different from the era that gave rise to Marxism–Leninism. On the basis of Juche idea, the leader gave a profound explanation of the theories, strategies and tactics of national liberation, class emancipation and human liberations in our era. Thus, it can be said that the revolutionary theory of Kimilsungism is a perfect revolutionary theory of Communism in the era of Juche.

According to analyst Shin Gi-wook, the ideas of Juche and Kimilsungism are in essence the "expressions of North Korean particularism over supposedly more universalistic Marxism–Leninism". The new terminology signalled a move from socialism to nationalism. This was evident in a speech presented by Kim Jong Il in 1982, during celebrations of his father's 70th birthday, in which he stated that love for the nation came before love for socialism. This particularism gave birth to concepts such as "A Theory of the Korean Nation as Number One" (조선민족제일주의) and "Socialism of Our Style" (우리식사회주의).

Following the death of Kim Jong Il in December 2011, Kimilsungism became Kimilsungism–Kimjongilism (김일성-김정일주의) at the 4th Conference of the Workers' Party of Korea in April 2012. Party members at the conference stated that the WPK was "the party of Kim Il Sung and Kim Jong Il" and declared Kimilsungism–Kimjongilism "the only guiding idea of the party". Afterwards, the Korean Central News Agency (KCNA) stated that "the Korean people have long called the revolutionary policies ideas of the President [Kim Il Sung] and Kim Jong Il as Kimilsungism–Kimjongilism and recognized it as the guiding of the nation". Kim Jong Un, the son of Kim Jong Il who succeeded him as leader of the WPK, said:

Kimilsungism–Kimjongilism is an integral system of the idea, theory and method of Juche and a great revolutionary ideology representative of the Juche era. Guided by Kimilsungism–Kimjongilism, we should conduct Party building and Party activities, so as to sustain the revolutionary character of our Party and advance the revolution and construction in line with the ideas and intentions of the President [Kim Il Sung] and the General [Kim Jong Il].

Naenara, the official web portal of the North Korean government, declares: "The Democratic People's Republic of Korea is an independent socialist state guided by the great Kimilsungism–Kimjongilism in its activities."

All references to Kimilsungism–Kimjongilism were officially removed from the Rules of the Workers' Party of Korea as amended at the 9th Congress of the Workers' Party of Korea in 2026.

=== Socialism of Our Style ===
"Socialism of Our Style" (우리식사회주의), also referred to as "Korean-style socialism" and "our-style socialism" within North Korea, is an ideological concept Kim Jong Il introduced on 27 December 1990 in the speech "Socialism of Our Country is a Socialism of Our Style as Embodied by the Juche Idea" (우리 나라 사회주의는 주체 사상을 구현한 우리식 사회주의이다). Speaking after the Revolutions of 1989 that brought down the Eastern Bloc countries, Kim Jong Il explicitly stated that North Korea needed – and survived because of – Socialism of Our Style. He argued that socialism in Eastern Europe failed because they "imitated the Soviet experience in a mechanical manner". According to Kim, they failed to understand that the Soviet experience was based on specific historical and social circumstances and could not be used by other countries aside from the Soviet Union itself. He added that "if experience is considered absolute and accepted dogmatically it is impossible to build Socialism properly, as the times change and the specific situation of each country is different from another". Kim Jong Il went on to criticize "dogmatic application" of Marxism–Leninism, stating:

Marxism–Leninism presented a series of opinions on building of Socialism and Communism, but it confined itself to presupposition and hypothesis owing to the limitations of the conditions of their ages and practical experiences ... But many countries applied the principles of Marxist–Leninist materialistic conception of history dogmatically, failing to advance revolution continually after the establishment of the socialist system.

North Korea would not encounter such difficulties because of the conceiving of Juche. In his words, North Korea was "a backward, colonial semifeudal society" when the communists took over, but since the North Korean communists did not accept Marxism, which was based on European experiences with capitalism, or Leninism, which was based on Russia's experience, they conceived of Juche. He believed that the situation in North Korea was more complex because of the American presence in nearby South Korea. Thanks to Kim Il Sung, Kim Jong Il argued, the revolution had "put forward original lines and policies suited to our people's aspirations and the specific situation of our country". "The Juche idea is a revolutionary theory which occupies the highest stage of development of the revolutionary ideology of the working class", Kim Jong Il said, further stating that the originality and superiority of the Juche idea defined and strengthened Korean socialism. He then conceded by stating that Socialism of Our Style was "a man-centered Socialism", explicitly making a break with basic Marxist–Leninist thought, which argues that material forces are the driving force of historical progress, not people. Socialism of Our Style was presented as an organic sociopolitical theory, using the language of Marxism–Leninism, saying:

The political and ideological might of the motive force of revolution is nothing but the power of single-hearted unity between the leader, the Party, and the masses. In our socialist society, the leader, the Party, and the masses throw in their lot with one another, forming a single socio-political organism. The consolidation of blood relations between the leader, the Party and the masses is guaranteed by the single ideology and united leadership.

== Analysis ==
=== Criticisms ===
Critics have called Juche a nationalist ideology and a departure from Marxist–Leninist principles. American Koreanist Brian Reynolds Myers argues that Juche has more in common with Japanese fascism and ultranationalism than Marxism–Leninism. Korean political scientist Suh Dae-sook argues that Kim Il Sung did not explain the difference between socialist patriotism, which he said he supported, and nationalism, which he said he opposed. Suh also criticized Kim Il Sung's initial conceptualization of Juche, saying that he had failed to explain how Marxism–Leninism had been applied to Korean conditions. American historian Derek R. Ford, by contrast, emphasizes the continuity between Marxism–Leninism and Juche, and credits Juche as the guiding principle that allowed North Korea to survive the collapse of the Eastern Bloc.

American historian Charles K. Armstrong argues that North Korea may appear "Stalinist in form" but is "nationalist in content". Shin Gi-wook similarly argues that "there is no trace of Marxism–Leninism or the Stalinist notion of nationhood" in North Korea, and its government instead stresses the importance of the Korean people's blood, soul, and national traits, echoing earlier Korean nationalists such as Sin Chaeho, Yi Kwangsu, and Choe Namson. Shin believes that the key difference between Marxism–Leninism and Juche is that the latter places ideology above materialism; the vocabulary of family lineage and nationalism is retained and given primacy over class struggle, while social distinction and hierarchy are supported instead of a classless society and egalitarianism.

A few critics have dismissed the idea that Juche is an ideology altogether. Myers argues that Juche cannot be described as a true political ideology because it does not have an underlying belief system, while Alzo David-West calls it "meaningless on logical and naturalistic grounds". American political analyst Robert E. Kelly argues that Juche exists solely to protect the Kim family's monopoly over political power in North Korea. However, Myers dismisses the idea that Juche is North Korea's leading ideology, regarding its public exaltation as designed to deceive foreigners. He argues that it exists to be praised and not actually read. Based on his experience living in North Korea, Swiss businessman Felix Abt calls Myers's arguments "shaky" and "questionable". Having seen the extent to which North Korean university students actually believe in Juche, Abt says it is "rather absurd" to call it "window-dressing" for foreigners. American historian Bruce Cumings and Professor of International Relations Christoph Hartmut Bluth similarly argue that Juche is not mere rhetoric, but rather an ideal of self-reliance that North Korea has attempted to implement.

=== Comparisons to other ideologies ===
Juche has been compared to Ba'athism, an Arab nationalist ideology that advocates the establishment of a unified Arab state based on socialism and national self-reliance. South Korean political commentator Park Sang-seek argues that Syrian Ba'athism in particular has rhetorical similarities to Juche, but the latter has a stronger ideological basis.

American economist Benjamin Zycher, writing for the conservative thinktank American Enterprise Institute, opined that the political ideology of Donald Trump shares similarities with Juche. In particular, he noted that both Trump and Juche advocate a policy of isolationism and autarky.

=== Comparisons to religion ===
A number of scholars have compared facets of Juche to those of preexisting Korean religions. Jung Tae-il argues that certain elements of Christianity, Cheondoism, and Confucianism were appropriated by and incorporated into Juche. Korean cultural anthropologists Byung Ho Chung and Heonik Kwon liken the commemorations of Kim Il Sung and Kim Jong Il to Confucian ancestor worship. Ju Jun-hui similarly contends that Korean shamanism influenced Juche, comparing the ecstatic state experienced in a shamanic ritual (gut) to the enthusiasm and fervor North Koreans display for their supreme leader. Armstrong accordingly calls Juche a quasi-religion.

==== Presence of a sacred leader ====
The ideology teaches that the role of a Great Leader is essential for the popular masses to succeed in their revolutionary movement because without leadership they cannot survive. This is the foundation of Kim Il Sung's cult of personality. The personality cult explains how the Juche ideology has endured, even during the North Korean government's undeniable dependence on foreign assistance during its famine in the 1990s. The concept of a "sacred leader" in Juche as well as the cult around the Kim family has been compared to the State Shinto ideology of Imperial Japan, in which the Emperor was seen as a divine being.

Through the fundamental belief in the essential role of the Great Leader, Kim Il Sung has become the "supreme deity for the people" and the Juche doctrine is reinforced in North Korea's constitution as the country's guiding principle. The parallel relationship structure between Kim Il Sung and his people and religious founders or leaders and their followers has led many scholars to consider Juche a religious movement as much as a political ideology. However, those familiar with cults posit that Juche bypasses the tenets of religion completely and instead meets the criteria of a totalitarian cult.

Juche's emphasis on the political and sacred role of the leader and the ensuing worship by the popular masses has been critiqued by various Western Marxists, who argue that the North Korean proletariat has been stripped of its honor, and call the cult of personality non-Marxist and undemocratic.

==== Rituals ====
The religious behavior of Juche can also be seen in the perspectives of the North Korean people through refugee interviews from former participants in North Korea's ritual occasions. One pertinent example is the Arirang Festival, a gymnastic and artistic festival held in the Rungrado 1st of May Stadium in Pyongyang. All components of the festival, from the selection of performers, mobilization of resources, recruitment of the audience, and publicity for the show have been compared to facets of a national religious event.

The Arirang Festival has been said to show the power of the North Korean government to arrange a form of religious gathering. It has done so by "appropriating a mass of bodies for calisthenic and performative arts representing the leader as the father and his faithful followers". The festival's effectiveness in transforming its participants into loyal disciples of Juche seems to originate from the collectivist principle of "one for all and all for one" and the ensuing emotional bond and loyalty to the leader. According to accounts of refugees who were recruited to mass gymnastics, the collectivist principle is nurtured by physical punishment such as beatings and more importantly the organization of recruits into small units, whose performances were held accountable by larger units. The festival's ritual components of collectivism serve to reinforce a "certain structure of sociality and affect", establishing Kim Il Sung as the "father" in both the body and psyche of the performers.

==== Familism ====
American historian Charles K. Armstrong argues that familism has transformed itself into a kind of political religion in the form of Juche. With the emergence of Juche as North Korea's guiding political principle since the 1960s, the familial relationship within the micro-family unit has been translated into a national, macro-unit, with Kim Il Sung representing the father and the North Korean people his children. Juche is thus based on the language of family relationships with its East Asian or neo-Confucian "resonances of filial piety and maternal love".

Armstrong also argues that North Korea has transferred the "filial piety of nationalism in the family of the leader himself" by positioning Kim Il Sung as the universal patriarch. He argues that while the official pursuit of the Juche ideology in the 1960s signalled North Korea's desire to separate from the "fraternity of international socialism", the ideology also replaced Stalin as the father figure with Kim Il Sung. In effect, North Korea's familial nationalism has supplanted the "rather abstract, class-oriented language of socialism with a more easily understandable and identifiable language of familial connections, love and obligations".

After attaining significant positions in the WPK and military in the early 1980s, Kim Jong Il transformed the personality cult surrounding Kim Il Sung into a family cult and became the heir apparent. Armstrong calls this a "family romance", a term Sigmund Freud used to describe "the neurotic replacement of a child's real parents with fantasy substitutes". Kim Il Sung's consecration as the "Great Father" has been strengthened by the development of the North Korean family romance with the language, symbols, and rituals associated with familism.

== See also ==
- Communism in Korea
- Ilminism, the political ideology of Syngman Rhee, the first president of South Korea
- Juche faction, a political faction within South Korea's student movements
- Kim Il Sung bibliography
- Kim Jong Il bibliography
- Kim Jong Un bibliography
- National communism
- Revisionism (Marxism)
