= Embassy of North Korea, Berlin =

North korean Embassy in Germany

Embassy of the Democratic People’s Republic of Korea in Berlin
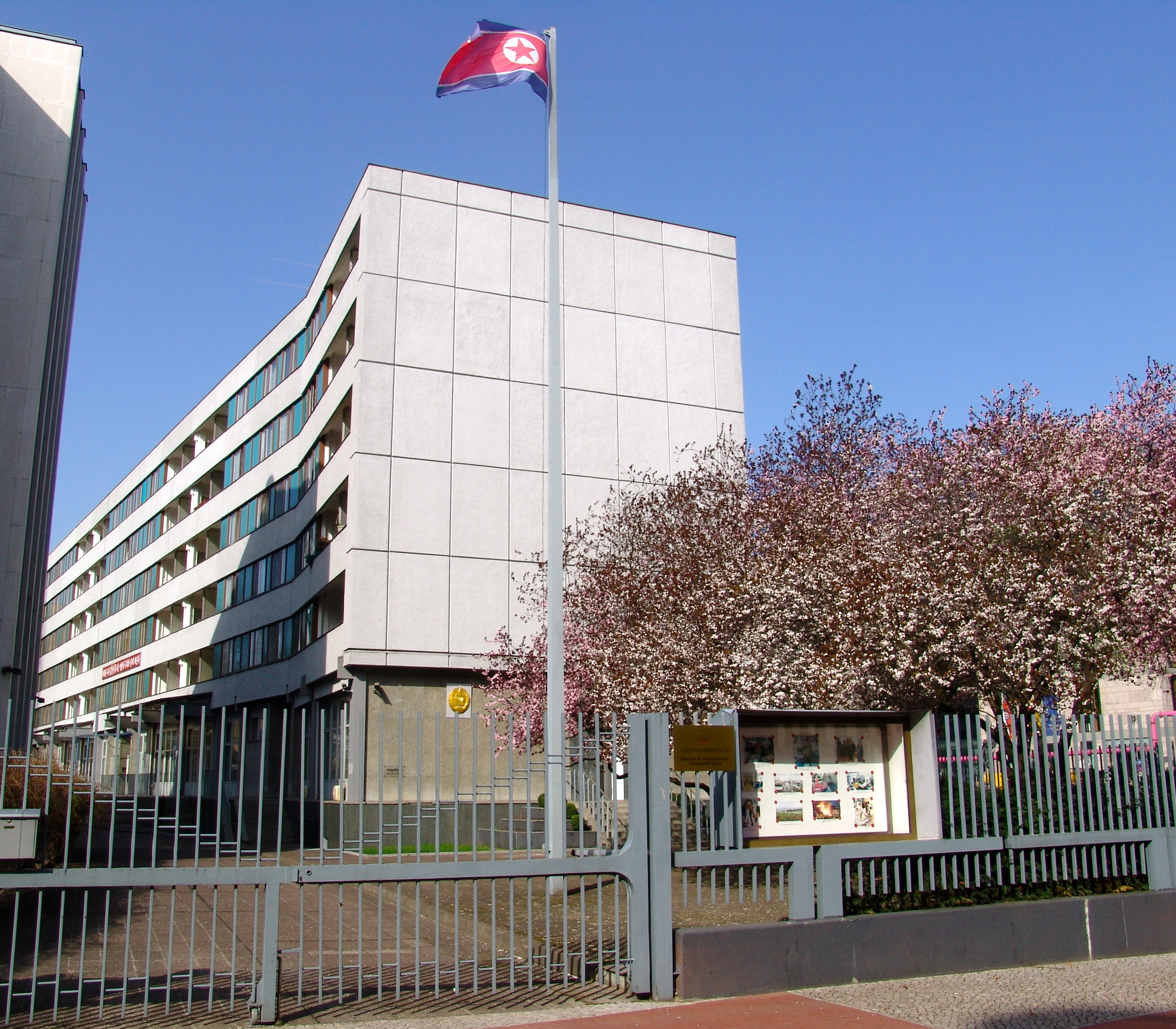
- Location: Berlin Mitte, Berlin
- Coordinates: 52.511339°N 13.386561°E
- Ambassador: Pak Nam-yong

The Embassy of the Democratic People's Republic of Korea in Berlin was the diplomatic mission of North Korea to the Federal Republic of Germany. It is located at Glinkastraße 5–7 in the district Berlin-Mitte. Since 24 April 2017, the ambassador has been Pak Nam-Yong.

The North Korean Embassy rented out its main building to the hotel company EGI GmbH, who operated the "City Hostel Berlin" in the building and thus generated foreign exchange for North Korea. According to a UN resolution from 2016 (resolution 2270) it is prohibited to rent or lease any property from North Korea. This is to prevent North Korea from generating foreign currency that the People's Republic could use to procure materials for its nuclear program. Attempts by German authorities to take action against it had been unsuccessful until 2020, when it was closed. Before World War II the Hotel Kaiserhof stood on the grounds of the embassy.

== See also ==
- List of diplomatic missions of North Korea
- Foreign relations of North Korea
