= Combat League of German Socialists =

Former German political organization

Combat League of German Socialists Kampfbund Deutscher Sozialisten
- Abbreviation: KDS
- Leader: Thomas Brehl
- Founder: Thomas Brehl (Langen); Michael Koth (Berlin); Michael Thiel (Duisburg); Frank Hübner (Cottbus)
- Founded: May 1, 1999
- Dissolved: 2008
- Newspaper: Der Gegenangriff
- Membership (2004): ca. 50
- Ideology: Neo-Nazism; Querfront

Party flag
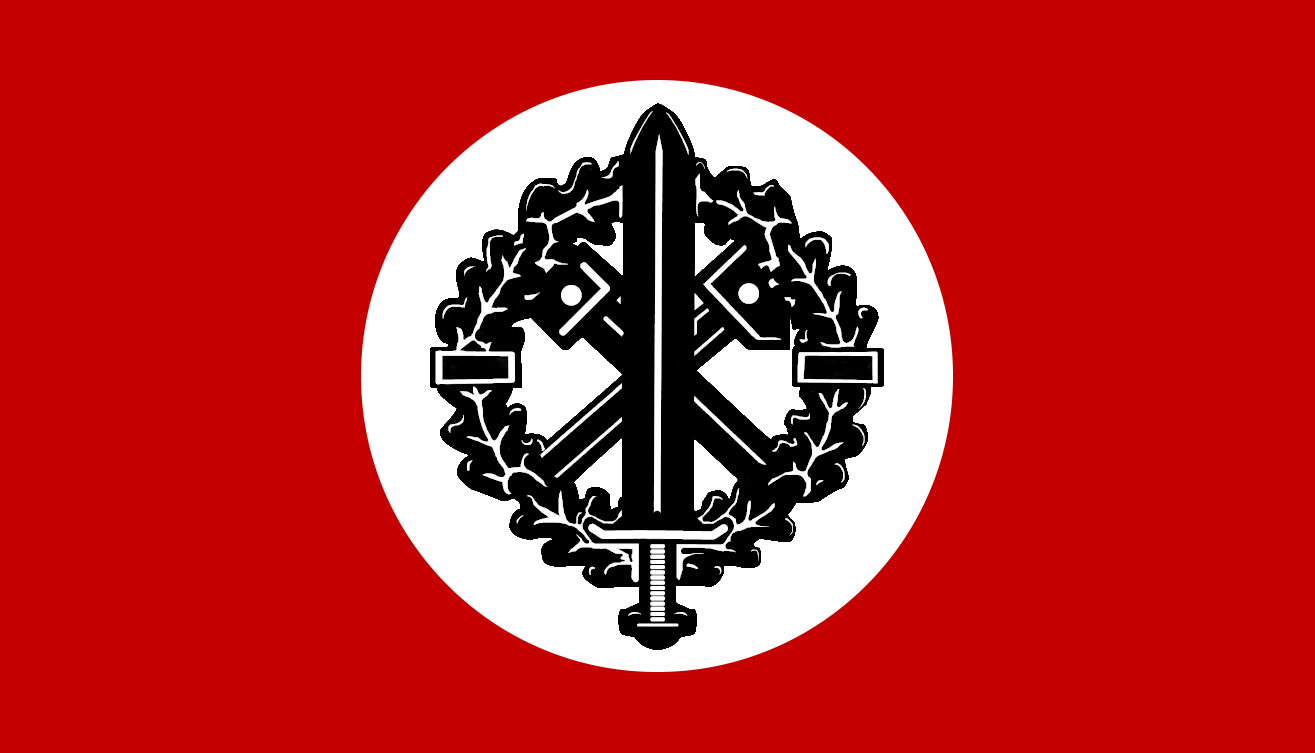

Website
- http://www.kds-im-netz.de (archived)

The Combat League of German Socialists (German: Kampfbund Deutscher Sozialisten) short-form: KDS, was a German Querfront and neo-Nazi organization founded on 1 May 1999 and dissolved in 2008.

== History ==
In 1997, Michael Koth would meet with Thomas Brehl and other west German neo-nazis in Langen to discuss the possibility of founding a new Querfront organization after his political party, the Workers' Party of Germany had failed. The KDS was subsequently founded on the 1 May 1999 in Krimnitz, Lübbenau near Cottbus. The founding involved primarily the aforementioned Koth and Brehl, but also the prominent neo-Nazi activists Michael Thiel and Frank Hübner. Other neo-Nazis, such as Axel Reitz were also present.

The KDS dissolved in 2008, stating their strategy to have failed.

== Ideology ==
The group detailed its purpose and self-understanding in its founding document, the "Langener Erklärung". It was founded with the explicit aim of uniting the political left and right via the Querfront strategy, wanting to serve as a "Discussion and combat forum on the basis of the collective commitment to Volk [nation] and homeland".

The KDS repeatedly appealed to the nation-state as well as anti-imperialism and the right to self-determination of peoples. It rejected all forms of "internationalist" tendencies such as imperialism, capitalism, liberalism, and globalization ("One-World-Terror"). The KDS primarily blamed the United States and Israel for such trends.

In multiple articles released on its website, the KDS addressed Turks in a friendly manner, while also rejecting Turkey's accession into the European Union.

The KDS would continuously praise Saddam Hussein and would on multiple occasions be invited into the Iraqi embassy in Berlin, through which it would hold contact to the regime. Brehl noted Hussein as someone "who reminds us of our Führer Adolf Hitler in some ways, who defies America's enormous superiority". The KDS similarly sought solidarity with Slobodan Milosevic in Yugoslavia, Hugo Chávez in Venezuela, Mahmoud Ahmadinejad in Iran, and especially North Korea.

In response to the accusation that the KDS is a "gay club" the organization released a statement on its website, and later two articles by Thomas Brehl and Axel Reitz, where the organization took a "moderate" stance on homosexuality. It condemned the use of homosexuality as an insult, mentioned that it allows gay members in the organization, and stated that: "What two adults do behind closed doors with mutual consent is their business and does not concern outsiders, let alone the movement!"

The Verfassungsschutz in Berlin noted that the KDS lacked any actual unifying program or ideology. While some sectors of the KDS took heavy influence from left-nazis, particularly the deceased neo-Nazi activist Michael Kühnen, with whom Thomas Brehl used to be acquainted, the Berlin sector under the leadership of Koth was said to have a far more national bolshevik lean, taking influences from Juche and the former SED. As Koth was the primary producer of KDS media and propaganda, resulting in his sectors views dominating the group's website and public appearance.

Axel Reitz, a former member turned anti-fascist activist and YouTuber, referred to the KDS as "nothing more than the usual neo-Nazi group".

== Media ==
Parts of the group's establishment were broadcast in the ZDF. The KDS also published the newspapers "Der Gegenangriff" (The Counterattack) and "Wetterleuchten". Most media activities were reportedly managed by Michael Koth, who also registered the KDS website's domain. Koth would run the group's YouTube channel and web series (started in 2000) "Der Rot-Braune Kanal" (The red-brown channel), which he continued to run even after the KDS had dissolved.

Most posters released by the KDS were focused on anti-Imperialism, anti-Americanism, and anti-Zionism; reflecting Koth's views and likely also originating from his wing of the organization.

== See also ==
- Michael Kühnen
- National Bolshevism
- Workers' Party of Germany
