= Political syncretism =

Combining elements from across the left–right spectrum

Political syncretism, or syncretic politics, combine elements from across the conventional left–right political spectrum. The main idea of syncretic politics is that taking political positions of neutrality by combining elements associated with left-wing politics and right-wing politics can achieve a goal of reconciliation.

Political syncretism is also referred to as catch-all politics, and is characterized by vague positioning on the political spectrum. Syncretic parties exhibit very high levels of ideological adaptability and flexibility, constantly switching positions and modifying their stances in order to broaden their electorate, without a consolidated commitment to concrete ideologies or political tradition.

E.J. Rivera Pichardo et al. argue that "[a]lthough centrist forms of populism are relatively rare, some populist movements intentionally create ideological ambiguity to attract support; this type of populism is variously referred to as 'non-positional,' 'catchall,' 'valence', or 'syncretic' populism."

== Historical examples ==
=== Spain ===
The Falange of Spain, while allied with the nationalist right side during the Spanish Civil War and being widely considered to be far right, presented itself definitively as syncretic. Falangism has attacked both the left and the right as its "enemies", declaring itself to be neither left nor right, but a Third Position.

=== United Kingdom ===
In the United Kingdom, the emergence of New Labour under Tony Blair and Gordon Brown was a pitch for the Third Way, mixing neoliberal economic policies, such as banking privatization, with socially progressive policies.

=== United States ===
In the United States, Third Way adherents embrace fiscal conservatism to a greater extent than traditional social liberals and advocate some replacement of welfare with workfare, and sometimes have a stronger preference for market solutions to traditional problems (as in pollution markets), while rejecting pure laissez-faire economics and other right-libertarian positions. This style of governing was firmly adopted and partly redefined during the administration of President Bill Clinton. Political scientist Stephen Skowronek introduced the term "Third Way" into the interpretation of American presidential politics. Such presidents undermine the opposition by borrowing policies from it in an effort to seize the middle and with it to achieve political dominance. This technique is known as triangulation and was used by Bill Clinton and other New Democrats who sought to move beyond the party's New Deal liberalism reputation in response to the political realignment of the 1980s. Through this strategy, Clinton adopted themes associated with the Republican Party, such as fiscal conservatism, welfare reform, deregulation and law and order policies. Famously, he declared in the 1996 State of the Union Address that "the era of big government is over".

== Other examples ==
- Arab Socialist Ba'ath Party – Iraq Region, Iraq (1966–2003)
- Combat League of German Socialists, Germany (1999–2008)
- Crusade of Romanianism, Romania (1934–1937)
- Five Star Movement, Italy
- LMP – Hungary's Green Party, Hungary
- National Bolshevik Party, Russia (1993–2007)
- National Union for Social Justice, United States (1934–1936)
- Partido Demokratiko Pilipino, Philippines
- People's Party – Movement for a Democratic Slovakia, Slovakia
- Sahra Wagenknecht Alliance, Germany
- Social Democratic Party, Romania
- Syrian Social Nationalist Party, Syria, Lebanon, Jordan, and Palestine
- Social Credit Party of Canada (1935–1993)

== See also ==
- Georgism
- Freiwirtschaft
- Horseshoe theory
- LaRouche movement
- Left-conservatism
- National Bolshevism
- Nazi-Maoism
- Third Position
