= Revolutionary nationalism =

Philosophy of nationalist political movements

Revolutionary nationalism is a name that has been applied to the political philosophy of many different types of nationalist political movements that wish to achieve their goals through a revolution against the established order. Individuals and organizations described as being revolutionary nationalist include some political currents within the French Revolution, Irish republicans engaged in armed struggle against the British crown, the Cần Vương movement against French rule in Vietnam, the Indian independence movement in the 20th century, some participants in the Mexican Revolution, Benito Mussolini and the Italian Fascists, the Autonomous Government of Khorasan in 1920s Iran, Augusto Cesar Sandino, the Revolutionary Nationalist Movement in Bolivia, black nationalism in the United States, and some African independence movements.

== Africa ==
Several African independence movements in the 20th century have been characterized as revolutionary nationalist.

One African anti-colonial leader considered to have been a revolutionary nationalist was Amilcar Cabral, who led independence movements in Guinea-Bissau and Cape Verde. Cabral founded the African Party for the Independence of Guinea and Cape Verde in 1956. The party began an armed struggle against the Portuguese colonial authorities in 1963, and eventually Guinea-Bissau and Cape Verde won their independence in 1974 and 1975 respectively. This colonial war also led to the rise of the Armed Forces Movement in Portugal itself, which overthrew the dictatorship in that country. Cabral's revolutionary nationalism was embodied in the concept of "unity and struggle," which aimed to unite the various ethnic and cultural communities of Guinea-Bissau and Cape Verde into a single national identity based on the struggle against colonial rule.

Another African movement whose ideology has been called revolutionary nationalism is the People's Front for Democracy and Justice (PFDJ) in Eritrea. The PFDJ's ideology emphasizes the legacy of the Eritrean struggle for independence, and seeks to "inculcate the values of The Struggle in Eritrean youth by loosely (and sometimes directly) simulating the experiences of the fighters in the war for liberation." In addition, the PFDJ promotes "an idea of a multicultural, multireligious, unified national whole."

Revolutionary nationalism has also been identified as a theme in the works of Kenyan writer Ngugi wa Thiong'o.

== Asia ==
The term revolutionary nationalism has been used to describe elements of the Indian independence movement that opposed British rule in India. The Indian state of Jharkhand was host to revolutionary nationalist political groups starting in the period between 1902 and 1918, and especially from 1912 onward. The Dhaka Anushilan Samiti and other nationalist movements from Bengal extended their operations into Jharkhand during this period, and their aim was to inspire a large violent uprising against British rule. They sought to obtain dynamite, gunpowder and other explosives from the mines of Jharkhand, but their activities were discovered and many revolutionary nationalists were arrested.

In Bihar, an Indian state located north of Jharkhand, there were also violent pro-independence organizations in the early 20th century that have been described as revolutionary nationalists or as terrorists. They had "faith in methods of violence for securing freedom" and they faced increasing government repression. When they were arrested, they received legal assistance from members of the Indian National Congress, although Congress opposed the use of violence.

In India, revolutionary nationalism is also identified with the memory of Bhagat Singh, who was executed by the British in 1931 for his role in the Lahore Conspiracy Case.

In the history of Vietnam, the term revolutionary nationalism has been used to refer to the opposition to French colonial rule that began in the 1880s among patriotic Vietnamese court officials and provincial elites, who formed the Can Vuong movement. This movement sought to restore the Vietnamese emperor and preserve traditional society, but it was defeated by superior French firepower. It later inspired a second generation of anticolonial leadership in the 20th century.

In Iran, the rebellion of Colonel Mohammad Taqi Pessian in 1921 has been described as an experiment in revolutionary nationalism. Pessian led a military state based in Mashhad, which acted as a rival to the central government led by Reza Khan after the 1921 Persian coup d'etat.

== Europe ==
In Europe, the term revolutionary nationalism has been applied to a variety of nationalist political movements, stretching back to the French Revolution of the 18th century. French revolutionary nationalism was a form of civic nationalism, seeking to impose a common national identity on the entire population of France, regardless of ethnic origin or regional cultures and languages. This nationalism was revolutionary in that it aimed at a "homogenization of mankind," not wishing to "exclude anyone who does not fit a particular ethnic profile but rather to include anyone willing to adopt a particular cultural identity."

Irish nationalism of the 19th century has also been characterized as revolutionary nationalism, in that it sought a revolutionary overthrow of British rule in Ireland. Following the defeat of the Young Ireland rebellion in 1848, many of the rebel leaders fled into exile to Paris, where they "found themselves at the intellectual centre of revolutionary nationalism." The Irish revolutionaries in exile made contacts with Polish nationalists who were also fighting for national independence and who advocated ideas of "'salutary' terrorism and mobilization of the peasantry for acts of violence," which inspired Irish revolutionary nationalism. The Irish revolutionary nationalists came to be called Fenians, and this movement included Irish organizations on both sides of the Atlantic, such as the Irish Republican Brotherhood and the Fenian Brotherhood.

After World War II, in France, the term revolutionary nationalism was adopted in self-description by a Third Positionist movement that aimed to be politically syncretic and combined far-right nationalism and left-wing nationalism.

== Americas ==
In Bolivia, the Revolutionary Nationalist Movement is a political party that was formed in 1941, led the National Revolution of 1952, and ruled the country from 1952 to 1964. According to Winston Moore Casanovas, revolutionary nationalism "has become an anti-oligarchical ideology of the dominated sector, the official ideology of the Bolivian state after 1952, and stands at the heart of the rationale of the authoritarian military regimes in power from 1964 onwards."

In Peru, the military government of Juan Velasco Alvarado from 1968 to 1975 has been called a revolutionary nationalist period in the country's history.

The Nicaraguan revolutionary leader Augusto Cesar Sandino, who fought against the United States occupation of Nicaragua in the late 1920s and early 1930s, has also been called a revolutionary nationalist.

Certain aspects of the Mexican Revolution of 1910–1920 have been identified with revolutionary nationalism. For instance, according to Robert F. Alegre, Mexican railway workers "embraced revolutionary nationalism as an expression of their disapproval of foreign ownership of the railways, heightened no doubt by their contempt for foreign managers." Alegre also argues that "revolutionary nationalism drew on and reinforced rielero masculinity – workers' view of themselves as distinctively strong, brave, and independent. Their participation in armed conflict placed these qualities into sharp relief."

Former Venezuelan president Hugo Chávez described his political movement on many occasions as "revolutionary nationalist."

In the United States, some black nationalist groups have been regarded as representing a form of revolutionary nationalism. Especially in the aftermath of the assassination of Martin Luther King Jr. in 1968, some African American leaders came to the conclusion that racial integration was impossible and that a "Black Revolution" was necessary to build an independent black nation. One such leader was Rudy Shields, who endorsed black separatism in 1969 because he "felt like if we were separated, we were better and we were stronger, because when you have white people teaching your children, then what they get is the white concept of life." This perspective declined over the following decades, but revolutionary nationalist themes have been identified as an element of jazz music as late as the 1980s, when they influenced Asian American musicians.

== See also ==
- Anarchism and nationalism
- Civic nationalism
- Conservative Revolution
- Indigenism
- Irish republicanism
- Left-wing nationalism
- Liberalism and nationalism
- Sansepolcrismo
- Soviet patriotism
- National syndicalism
- Plurinationalism
- Third Position
