= Ecology Center =

Ecology Center may refer to:

- Ecology Center (Ann Arbor), of Ann Arbor, Michigan
- Ecology Center (Berkeley), of Berkeley, California
- Harold H. Malkmes Wildlife Education and Ecology Center, a park, zoo, and ecology site in Holtsville, New York
- The Ecology Center (Orange County), of Orange County, California
- Urban Ecology Center, a nonprofit organization in Milwaukee, Wisconsin
