= Sovintern =

International organization of left-wing parties

International Socialist Network Sovintern
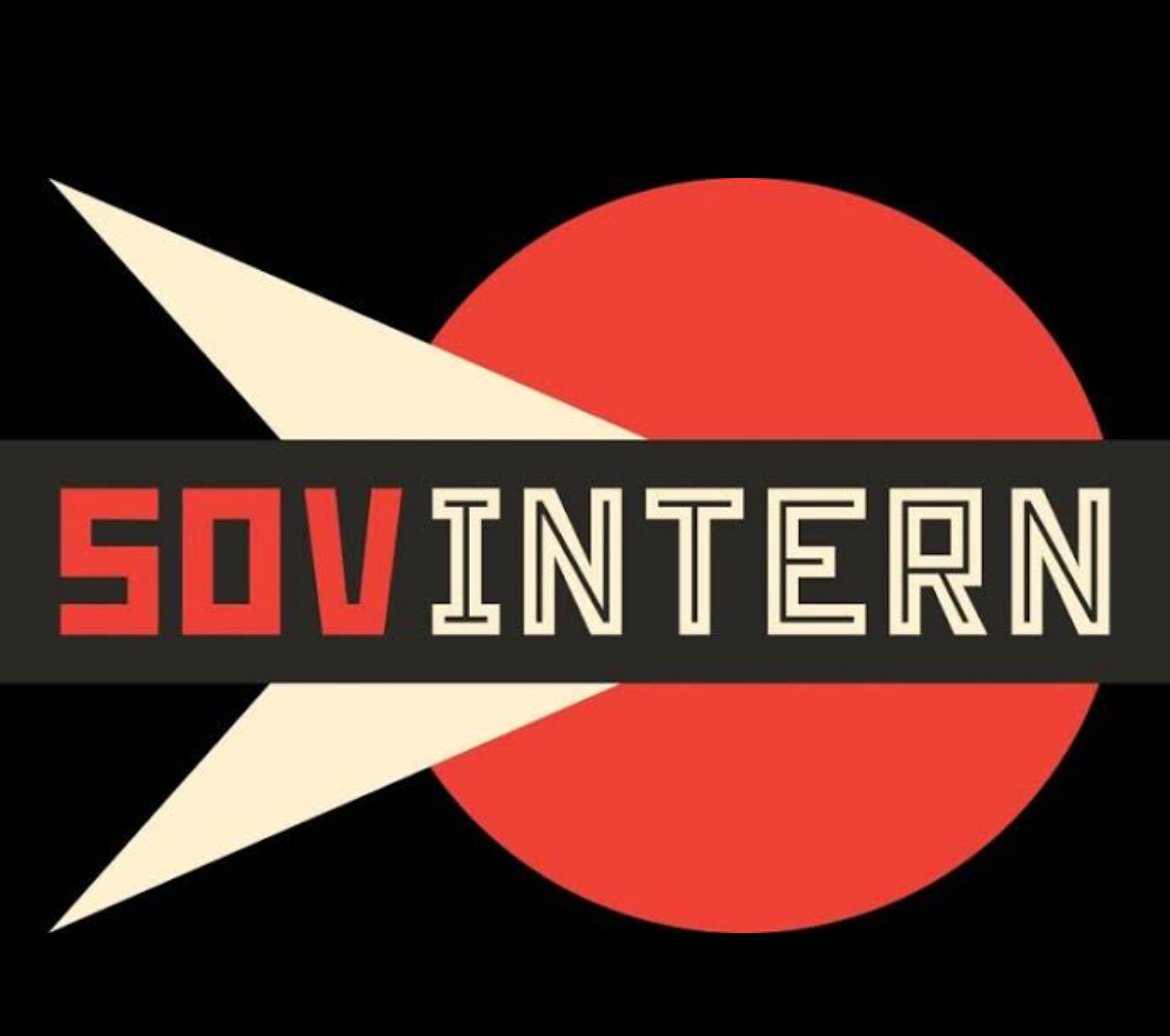
- Abbreviation: Sovintern
- Founder: Sergey Mironov
- Chairman of the Organizing Committee: Alexander Babakov
- Regional Coordinator for Latin America and Caribbean: Luis Pérez Leira
- Founded: 27 April 2026; 6 months ago
- Headquarters: Moscow, Russia
- Purpose: International coordination of socialist and left-wing political parties and movements
- Region served: Worldwide

Website
- sovintern.org/en

The International Socialist Network Sovintern (also known simply as the Soviet International or Sovintern) is a political international consisting of socialist, Marxist-Leninist, and other left-wing political parties and movements founded in Moscow, Russia in 2026. It was initiated by A Just Russia and presented as an alternative platform for international left-wing cooperation outside existing organizations such as the Socialist International.

The organization describes itself as a network-based international movement promoting socialism of the 21st century, anti-imperialism, and coordination among left-wing political forces.

== History ==
The Sovintern was inaugurated in Moscow, Russia, on 27 April 2026, and consists of over 15 member organisations. The representatives met at the House of the Trade Unions. The meeting was promoted by A Just Russia, a Russian party that presents itself as the left opposition to Vladimir Putin's United Russia. A Just Russia's leader, Sergey Mironov, addressed the participants on video.

Speakers at the inaugural Sovintern event included: Jackson Hinkle, Christopher Helali, former President of Bolivia Evo Morales, Liu Xu, Booker Ngesa Omole, Haz Al-Din, Carlos Alfredo Castañeda Magaña, Alan García Fernández, Aleksandar Djenić, George Galloway, Vladimir Lysenko, Pablo Salvador Sepúlveda Allende, Bojan Vulin, Bogdan Țîrdea, Juan Manuel De Jesús Flores Cornejo, Crispin Kabasele Tshimanga, Dimitrios Patelis, Fidel Antonio Castro Smirnov, Miguel Alexander Escobar, Akar Süleyman, Beatriz Bissio, Arling Alonso, Héctor Béjar, Snoussi Dabbabi, Said Bakkali, Mohamed Yeslem Beissat, Pawan Karki, and Goran Dimov, among others. A message from Russian president Putin was also read out during the event.

== Positions ==
The Sovintern opposes "Donald Trump's imperialism" and the "NATO war against Russia". It considers Western social democracy as promoted by the Socialist International to be subservient to American militarism.

The organization has expressed support for Cuba and has called on China, Russia, and BRICS member states to assist the country during its economic and energy crisis.

On 5 June 2026, the Sovintern expressed support for the presidential candidacy of Peru's Roberto Sánchez, the leader of the Together for Peru party.

== Criticism ==
Just like the FFN movement, the Sovintern has been described by Western political analysts as another Moscow-led proxy, meant to spread false narratives promoted by the Russian government, as part of their wider disinformation campaign.

Other socialists and communists have sharply criticised the Sovintern for its perceived campism, their staunch opposition to progressivism in favor of social conservatism, and their commitment to broader left-wing politics.

A self-ascribed anti-imperialist organization, it supports the Russian invasion of Ukraine, claiming that Russia is conducting a "denazification" operation.

== Participants ==
Representatives from these groups have participated in the Sovintern:

=== Political parties ===
Europe:

- A Just Russia
- (North Macedonia) The Left
- Party of Socialists of the Republic of Moldova
- (Serbia) New Communist Party of Yugoslavia
- (Serbia) Movement of Socialists
- (Spain) Green Left Party
- (Spain) Sovereignty and Labor
- (Italy) Communist Party of Popular Unity
- (Switzerland) Communist Party
- (Romania) Romanian Socialist Party
- (Turkey) Patriotic Party
- (United Kingdom) Workers Party of Britain

North America:

- (United States) / (Canada) American Communist Party
- (Nicaragua) Sandinista National Liberation Front
- (Honduras) People's Power Movement

South America:

- (Argentina) Authentic Socialist Party
- Communist Party of Argentina
- (Argentina) Patria Grande Front
- (Bolivia) EVO Pueblo
- Workers' Party of Chile (Marxist–Leninist)
- (Paraguay) Frente Guasu Alliance
- (Paraguay) Tekojoja People's Party

Africa:

- (Morocco) Party of Progress and Socialism
- Tunisia Forward
- (Democratic Republic of the Congo) Union of Democratic Socialists
- Communist Party Marxist – Kenya
- (Sahrawi Arab Democratic Republic) Polisario Front

Asia:

- (Nepal) Nepali Communist Party
- (South Korea) People's Democracy Party

=== Organizations and movements ===
- World Anti-Imperialist Platform
- Anti-Imperialist International of the Peoples
- (Russia) Institute for African Studies of the Russian Academy of Sciences
- (Russia) TROPASS
- (Russia) Vashi Novosti
- Foreign Journalists for Russia
- (Russia) / (Spain) Pamplona Russian Film Cycle
- (Spain) Slavic Cultural Association of Pamplona
- (Venezuela) Telesur
- (Russia) / (China) Russian Institute of Eastern Europe and Central Asia at the School of International Studies
- (China) Institute of Regional Countries
- (Turkey) Struggle Unity
- (Japan) Confederation of Lawyers of Asia and the Pacific
- (Brazil) Spirit of Bandung Movement
- Sovereigntist Left Chile
- (El Salvador) SIRAC Trade Union Association
- (Argentina) Martín Fierro Movement
- (Argentina) Our Homeland Movement
- (Argentina) Priests in Support of the Poor
- (Serbia) League of Communist Yugoslav Youth
- (Democratic Republic of the Congo) Women's League of the UDS

== Notable people ==
- Luis Pérez — Executive Secretary of the Anti-Imperialist International of the Peoples and Sovintern's Regional Coordinator for Latin America and the Caribbean
- Miguel Suárez del Cerro — Director of the Pamplona Russian Film Cycle and founder/president of the Slavic Cultural Association of Pamplona
- Patricio Brodsky — Sociologist, professor at the University of Buenos Aires, and Secretary of Political Education of the Anti-Imperialist International of the Peoples
- Jaime Flores — Lawyer and historian from Panama
- Jackson Hinkle — International Secretary of the American Communist Party

== See also ==
- For the Freedom of Nations! - Russian-led inter-party international movement (2024–present)
- Comintern – International Marxist organization (1919–1943)
- Cominform – International co-ordination body of Marxist–Leninist and communist parties (1947–1956)
- Comecon – International communist economic organization (1949–1991)
- Solidnet – Currently existing international co-ordination body of communist, Marxist–Leninist, and other workers' parties (1998–present)
