= For the Freedom of Nations! =

Russian-led international inter-party forum

"For the Freedom of Nations!" Movement Движение «За свободу наций!»
- Chairman: Dmitry Medvedev
- Founded: 16 February 2024
- Headquarters: Moscow, Russia
- Ideology: Anti-imperialism (claimed); Russophilia; Anti-Western sentiment
- Political position: Big tent

The Forum of Supporters of the Struggle against Modern Practices of Neocolonialism "For the Freedom of Nations!", (Note: Russian: Форум сторонников борьбы с современными практиками неоколониализма «За свободу наций!») also known as the "For the Freedom of Nations!" Movement (Note: Russian: Движение «За свободу наций!») or FFN (Note: Russian: ДЗСH!) is a Russian-led inter-party movement with a claimed goal of uniting political parties from various nations to counter neocolonialism. The movement was officially created in February 2024 on the initiative of the United Russia Party after the Forum's founding General Assembly was held in Moscow. Since then, political parties from more than 50 countries have joined the movement.

== Ideological background ==
Countering modern neocolonial practices is the self-proclaimed main goal of the "For the Freedom of Nations!" Movement. These practices are said to include "The imposition of sanctions and restrictive measures, weaponization of currencies, cultural indoctrination, falsification of history, information and psychological campaigns, etc.". The Movement claims that the West and capitalist countries are the main perpetrators of such practices and describes itself as a forum for consolidation of the political movements from countries of the Global South.

The ideological basis for the "For the Freedom of Nations!" Movement was expressed in its Chairman Dmitry Medvedev's article entitled "The time of metropoles is up". In it, he identifies several types of neocolonialism, which the Movement is called upon to fight, namely sanctions, monetary, debt, cultural-ideological, legal, regulatory, and "friendly", as well as its other types.

== Members ==
The movement is informal in nature, so it has no official membership criteria. The structure of the movement includes a Standing Committee, which includes political movements from 20 countries of the world.

The founding General Assembly of the Forum of Supporters of the Struggle against Modern Practices of Neocolonialism - "For the Freedom of Nations!" was attended by 50 political movements, including 8 European (from Azerbaijan, Armenia, Belarus, Bulgaria, Moldova, Russia, Serbia, and Turkey), 21 Asian (from Vietnam, Indonesia, Iran, Kazakhstan, Cambodia, Kyrgyzstan, Japan, China, North Korea, Laos, Lebanon, Malaysia, Mongolia, Myanmar, Nepal, Pakistan, Bangladesh, Palestine, Tajikistan, Thailand, Uzbekistan, and the Philippines), 11 African (from Algeria, Angola, Djibouti, Zimbabwe, Mozambique, Namibia, Uganda, the Central African Republic, Eritrea, Ethiopia, and South Africa), and 9 Latin American (from Bolivia, Brazil, Venezuela, Honduras, Cuba, Mexico, Nicaragua, Peru, and El Salvador).

== Structure ==
=== Standing Committee ===
The Standing Committee is the main executive institution of the movement. Dmitry Medvedev, Chairman of the United Russia Party was elected as the Chairman of the Standing Committee at the inaugural General Assembly. It also has two deputy chairmen, namely, Andrey Klimov, a member the Russian Federation's upper legislative chamber the Federation Council, and Evgeniy Ivanov, the Russian Federation's Deputy Minister for Foreign Affairs. The Standing Committee comprises 20 political movements:

Members of the Standing Committee of the "For the Freedom of Nations!" Movement
Country	Political party	Ideology	National Legislatures	Government
Algeria	National Liberation Front	Algerian nationalism Arab nationalism	54 / 174 90 / 407	In government
Azerbaijan	New Azerbaijan Party	Azerbaijani nationalism Conservatism	68 / 125	In government
Belarus	Belaya Rus	Statism; Left-conservatism	46 / 64 51 / 110	In government
Bosnia and Herzegovina	Alliance of Independent Social Democrats	Serbian nationalism Populism	3 / 15 6 / 42	In government
Brazil	Workers' Party	Social democracy Populism	9 / 81 64 / 513	In government
Cambodia	Cambodian People's Party	Khmer nationalism State capitalism	55 / 62 120 / 125	In government
China	Chinese Communist Party	Socialism with Chinese Characteristics; Xi Jinping thought	117 / 175 2,119 / 2,980	Sole party with leading role
Cuba	Communist Party of Cuba	Communism; Marxism-Leninism	442 / 470	Sole legal party
Eritrea	People's Front for Democracy and Justice	Eritrean nationalism	75 / 150	Sole legal party
Indonesia	Party of Functional Groups	Pancasila; Conservatism	102 / 580	In government
Laos	Lao People's Revolutionary Party	Communism; Marxism-Leninism	158 / 164	Sole legal party
Lebanon	Free Patriotic Movement	Christian democracy	13 / 128	Opposition
Mozambique	Mozambique Liberation Front	Democratic socialism	171 / 250	In government
Myanmar	Union Solidarity and Development Party	Buddhist nationalism Militarism	108 / 157 232 / 265	In government
Nicaragua	Sandinista National Liberation Front	Sandinismo	75 / 90	In government
North Korea	Workers' Party of Korea	Kimilsungism–Kimjongilism	671 / 687	Sole party with leading role
Pakistan	Pakistan Muslim League (Nawaz)	Liberal conservatism	19 / 96 113 / 336	In government
Russia	United Russia	Russian nationalism Conservatism	136 / 178 319 / 450	In government
Serbia	Serbian People's Party	National conservatism Right-wing populism	0 / 250	Extra-parliamentary (Note: The SNP won no seats in the 2026 parliamentary election, which it contested on the "Aleksandar Vučić – United Serbia" list.)
South Africa	African National Congress	Social democracy African nationalism	43 / 90 159 / 400	In government
Syria	Arab Socialist Ba'ath Party	Neo-Ba'athism	0 / 210	Dissolved
Tajikistan	People's Democratic Party of Tajikistan	Tajik nationalism Statism	0 / 33 49 / 63	In government
Venezuela	United Socialist Party of Venezuela	Socialism of the 21st century	219 / 277	In government
Zimbabwe	Zimbabwe African National Union – Patriotic Front	Populism; African nationalism	33 / 80 191 / 280	In government

The Standing Committee regularly holds discussions on key issues regarding the development and future activities of the Movement. It makes decisions on the strategic directions of the Movement's activities, determines the places and dates of regular and extraordinary General Assemblies, and also approves draft programmes and final documents. The Standing Committee was formed on the basis of the Organizing Committee, which functioned until the founding General Assembly of the Movement in February 2024.

Meetings of the (Organizing) Standing Committee of the "For the Freedom of Nations!" Movement
No.	Date	Place
1	30 March 2023	(Russia) Moscow
2	31 May 2023	via videoconference
3	21 November 2023	via videoconference
4	16 February 2024	(Russia) Moscow
5	17 June 2024	(Russia) Vladivostok

=== General Assemblies ===
General Assemblies of the "For the Freedom of Nations!" Movement are large-scale events, which are held every two years. The first one took place on February 15–17, 2024 in Moscow, Russia. Currently, plans are underway to hold the next General Assemblies in Latin America and Africa.

=== Expert Council and Coordination Working Group ===
The decision to create the Expert Council and the Coordination Working Group of the "For the Freedom of Nations!" Movement was adopted at the meeting of the Standing Committee of the Movement in Vladivostok, Russia, on June 17, 2024.

== Criticism ==
"For the Freedom of Nations!" Movement is criticized for being overly ideological and having a distorted view of neocolonialism. Political scientist M. Komin, in an article for the European Council on Foreign Relations (ECFR), writes that the movement did not lead to any serious results, except for a call to consider December 14 as the Day of Remembrance for the Victims of Colonialism.

Chatham House has published similar criticism of the movement, describing multipolarity as a ploy for Russia to gain regional hegemony over its neighbors; however, they view this approach as likely to work, and argue the West needs to combat it more actively.

== See also ==
- Axis of Resistance
- BRICS
- Sovintern
