= American Communist Party (2024) =

Political party in the US

- Abbreviation: ACP
- Chairperson: Haz Al-Din
- International Secretary: Jackson Hinkle
- Secretary of Education: Carlos L. Garrido
- Founders: Haz Al-Din; Jackson Hinkle
- Founded: July 21, 2024; 2 years ago
- Split from: Communist Party USA
- Newspaper: Red America; Southern Worker; California Worker
- Think tank: Institute for a Free America
- Membership (2026): 1,000
- Ideology: Communism (US); Marxism–Leninism; Xi Jinping Thought; Socialist patriotism; American patriotism; Pan-Americanism; Left-wing antiglobalism; Left-conservatism; Social conservatism (US)
- Political position: Syncretic (See: political positions)
- International affiliation: World Anti-Imperialist Platform (since 2024); Sovintern (since 2026)
- Slogan: "The Future Belongs to the Working Class"
- Members in public office: 2

Election symbol

Website
- acp.us

The American Communist Party (ACP) is a Marxist–Leninist political party in the United States. The ACP was formed in 2024 when its members split from the Communist Party USA (CPUSA).

The ACP officially espouses Marxism–Leninism. The ACP regards the Chinese view of the Sino-Soviet split as correct, considers Nikita Khrushchev's de-Stalinization efforts in the Soviet Union as having been revisionist, supports the Cultural Revolution while also supporting Deng Xiaoping's pro-market economic reforms, and upholds Juche. The ACP and its leaders have voiced support for China, North Korea, Iran, Nicaragua, Nicolás Maduro, and the Russian "Special Military Operation", stating that "Russia remains at the forefront of the world liberation movement".

The ACP has been described as "MAGA communist". Both notable ACP founders Jackson Hinkle and Haz Al-Din have promoted MAGA Communism and similar "conservative communist" labels since 2022. MAGA Communism has been characterized as pro-social services, pro-tax cuts, anti-Zionist, anti-feminist, anti-queer, anti-woke, and both anti-Donald Trump and pro-Donald Trump by critics. The ACP denies ever supporting Donald Trump, with ACP leaders arguing that MAGA Communism is a tool to shift the American working class away from capitalism and the Republican Party and toward communist mass politics.

== History ==
=== Origins ===
The ACP has two figureheads, the former environmental activist Jackson Hinkle and the political streamer and self-described anti-revisionist Marxist–Leninist Haz Al-Din. Hinkle and Al-Din would become acquainted with each other in 2021 after Hinkle garnered attention online for denying the Assad regime in Syria's use of chemical weapons on its civilian population. Al-Din was intrigued by Hinkle's appearance on left-wing streamer Vaush's show prompting Al-Din to make a formal introduction to Hinkle.

Both Al-Din and Hinkle were individuals who were attracted to the working class collectivist ideas exhibited by the Marxist–Leninist branch of communism and the nativist right-wing ideology espoused by the MAGA movement. This overlap in ideologies prompted Al-Din to coin their new ideology "MAGA communism" which Al-Din pitched to Hinkle as a new "working class revolutionary movement" while visiting Hinkle in Los Angeles later in 2021.

From 2022 until 2024 prior to ACP breaking away from the Communist Party USA (CPUSA), Al-Din and Hinkle attempted to join and remake the CPUSA in order to "reclaim" CPUSA from "liberals, federal agents and Democrats".

In May 2024, CPUSA's 32nd National Convention passed Resolution 5, which supported a "broad front to defeat Trump, Trumpism, and the MAGA Republicans". Al-Din's group opposed CPUSA's support for the Democrats and claimed that CPUSA had violated democratic centralism by suppressing opposition and limiting debate over Resolution 5.

=== Split from CPUSA ===
The American Communist Party (ACP) split from the Communist Party USA (CPUSA), and uses a modified version (left) of the CPUSA's hammer and sickle (right) as its party symbol.

In July 2024, the Infrared-led group split from the Communist Party USA (CPUSA) and created the American Communist Party (ACP). ACP described itself as "[a] reconstitution of the Communist Party USA", viewing the CPUSA as having had rejected Marxism–Leninism and embraced "allegiance to the Democratic Party". The ACP's founding executive committee included Jackson Hinkle, Haz Al-Din, and former Party of Communists USA (PCUSA) leader and International Freedom Battalion volunteer Christopher Helali. ACP has since positioned itself as a "patriotic" American alternative to CPUSA.

ACP's founding declaration stated that 29 CPUSA clubs and 3 PCUSA cells had switched affiliations to the new party. CPUSA leadership denied this and 10 of the listed CPUSA clubs denied signing it. (Note: CPUSA chapters that denied signing the ACP declaration: Philly CPUSA [@phillycpusa] (July 22, 2024). "The ACP outfit has nothing to do with the Debbie Amis Bell Club-Philadelphia CPUSA, the Philadelphia Young Communist League or our members. Any use of party identity or claims that our members and clubs are organizing under this formation are slanderous" (Tweet) – via X (formerly Twitter).; Southeast Los Angeles CPUSA [@CPUSA_SELA] (July 22, 2024). "The ACP outfit has nothing to do with the Southeast Los Angeles Club or its members, and any use of party identity or claims that our members and clubs are organizing under this formation are libel and slanderous" (Tweet) – via X (formerly Twitter).; Southern New Hampshire CPUSA [@snh_cpusa] (July 22, 2024). "I rarely come on as Chairperson on SNH CPUSA, but this sham and forgery being perpetrated currently by this ACP group is nothing short of wrecker ism and sabotage of the highest order. These are not comrades but Social Fascists in disguise, their rhetoric bordering on strasserite" (Tweet) – via X (formerly Twitter).; Bloomington-Normal CPUSA [@BloNoCpusa] (July 22, 2024). "The Bloomington-Normal Club of the Communist Party USA is not a part of, and wholly condemns, that "ACP"reactionary nonsesnse you may or may not come across on social media" (Tweet) – via X (formerly Twitter).; San Diego CPUSA [@SDClubCPUSA] (July 22, 2024). "The ACP outfit has nothing to do with our club, the San Diego Club, or its members, and any use of party identity or claims that our members and clubs are organizing under this formation are libel and slanderous" (Tweet) – via X (formerly Twitter).; Virginia CPUSA [@VACPUSA] (July 23, 2024). "The ACP outfit has nothing to do with our clubs or members (the CPUSA Richmond never existed, but the Piedmont club currently covers Richmond), and any use of party identity or claims that our members and clubs are organizing under this formation are libel and slanderous" (Tweet) – via X (formerly Twitter).; Los Angeles Metro CPUSA [@LACPUSA] (July 22, 2024). "The ACP outfit has nothing to do with the Los Angeles Metro Club or its members, and any use of party identity or claims that our members and clubs are organizing under this formation are libel and slanderous" (Tweet) – via X (formerly Twitter).; Iowa City CPUSA [@iowacitycpusa] (July 23, 2024). "The ACP outfit has nothing to do with our District of Iowa/Nebraska, the Iowa City Club or members, and any use of party identity or claims that our members and clubs are organizing under this formation are libel and slanderous" (Tweet) – via X (formerly Twitter).; Albany CPUSA [@AlbanyNY_CPUSA] (July 22, 2024). "We're not going to quote the post because there's no reason give these people more attention. No member of ours signed anything for acp. Nor would we ever" (Tweet) – via X (formerly Twitter).; Red Help ATX [@red_help_atx] (July 22, 2024). "We did not sign this. We would NEVER work with those chauvinist fucks. Keep our name away from your little cult, losers" (Tweet) – via X (formerly Twitter).) In response, ACP argued "these accounts are controlled by" the "[Joe] Sims clique", not "authentic representatives of the clubs".

In April 2024, prior to the official founding of the party, ACP think tank Institute for a Free America hosted a Free America to Free Palestine event in Dearborn, Michigan, which attracted controversy for its unique mixture of anti-Zionist, pro-Russia, and MAGA rhetoric.

=== Subsequent history ===
In August 2024, ACP joined the World Anti-Imperialist Platform. In November 2024, in Orange County, Vermont, ACP International Secretary Christopher Helali won a write-in campaign for high bailiff, a largely ceremonial position, with 5% turnout. From November 2024 to November 2025, Helali was the only member of a communist party who held elected office in the United States. In November 2025, three CPUSA candidates would join Helali in holding elected offices after winning city council or school council elections.

In March 2025, Hrvatska radiotelevizija described Jackson Hinkle as "the most famous American communist today" during an article on Hinkle's speech to the Houthis. On May 2, 2025, ACP representatives gathered in Chicago, Illinois to elect the party's first Central Committee, which consisted of 32 members. The party also defined its organizational structure, adopting the principle of democratic centralism.

During the 2025 New York City mayoral election, the party spoke against candidate Zohran Mamdani, whom Helali described as one of the "most anti-communist politicians" in practice and a "pure Democrat" who "sheepdogs the people once more into the dead end of the Democratic Party". The ACP denounced Mamdani's condemnations of Nicolás Maduro and Miguel Díaz-Canel, arguing that Mamdani "plays right into the hands of the CIA narratives and imperialist propaganda coming out of Washington". At the same time, the party stated that "there is no disagreement [with Mamdani] with providing affordable or even free childcare, healthcare, education, public transportation, and other public needs and service"; however, the ACP criticized Mamdani's proposal of creating an "office of LGBTQIA+ Affairs".

In December 2025, Jesse Watters showed footage of an ACP physical fitness camp on his Fox News show, which Watters described as a Democratic Party-run "commie boot camp". In response to the footage, Stephen Miller claimed that the Democratic Party is a "communist party" that supports "DEI communism". Later in December, ACP member Addison Aronson was selected to join the Dubuque, Iowa Arts & Cultural Affairs Commission.

On February 13, 2026, ACP hosted events both in New Jersey and Florida to commemorate the 84th birthday of deceased North Korean leader Kim Jong Il. At the events, ACP speakers expressed full support for Kim's son Kim Jong Un and voiced support for his re-election as General Secretary of the Workers' Party of Korea at the party's 9th Congress. In March 2026, Helali also met with the president of the DPRK International Solidarity Group Zheng Yutong, who expressed her plans on "strengthening ties with progressive forces such as the American Communist Party".

In April 2026, the ACP became a co-founder of the "Sovintern", an international network which aims to unite left-wing parties under the banner of "Socialism 2.0". Apart from the ACP, the network's co-founders include the Workers Party of Britain, Union of Democratic Socialists, Party of Progress and Socialism, Party of Socialists of the Republic of Moldova, Sandinista National Liberation Front, Movement of Socialists, Tunisia Forward, and A Just Russia. The network aims to introduce an alternative to capitalism, which would be based on the "achievements of Soviet civilization", and espouses socialism of the 21st century and socialist internationalism. According to Resumen Latinoamericano, Hinkle, who the publication identified as a member of the Executive Council of the ACP, was listed among the speakers scheduled for the inaugural Sovintern conference in Moscow. Haz Al-Din spoke at the first conference of the Sovintern on April 27, denouncing capitalism, and stating that the United States "has no moral or spiritual right to teach others or impose its value system" as it rules not through moral superiority, but through "material power, corruption, and bribery." Later that month, Al-Din claimed that he was under investigation by the FBI, allegedly receiving an email from his email provider Google LLC stating that the company released his personal information to the FBI because of the agency's legal proceedings.

== Ideological background ==
The American Communist Party's ideology is based on the political backgrounds of its two founders, Jackson Hinkle and Haz Al-Din. Haz Al-Din, who is a Lebanese American from Dearborn, Michigan, was a self-proclaimed "Marxist" during his university years who was somewhat sympathetic to the political ideology of Bernie Sanders. Hinkle is a former high-profile high school student environmental activist who supported Sanders and promoted school walkouts in favor of gun control, racial justice, and campaigns against building nuclear powerplants. In 2018 and 2019 Hinkle ran for public office in his hometown of San Clemente, California.

The election of Donald Trump galvanized both Hinkle and Al-Din to go further to the right on social issues while still maintaining their ideas on collectivism with regards to governmental oversight and economic policy. Al-Din has said that the mainstream American left is "out of touch with actual working people" and has called out their liberal values with regards to their tolerance of "so-called alternative sexualities and fringe countercultural tendencies." Additionally both Al-Din and Hinkle do not see a distinction between being patriotic as well as communist citing China and the Soviet Union as models to follow for their "MAGA communist" movement. The ACP models itself on the legacy of the Soviet Union and promotes Soviet nostalgia through their support of a Marxist–Leninist interpretation of communism which they allege was socially conservative in nature.

In its criticism to the party it split from, CPUSA, the ACP argues that the "political repression caused by McCarthyism has gradually eroded the revolutionary spirit and steadfastness" of the CPUSA, causing the party to have "rejected all Marxist–Leninist interpretations opposing neoliberalism". According to ACP, the CPUSA abandoned its original revolutionary socialist political position and instead adopted a stance of peaceful transition towards socialism, which the ACP denounces as "opportunism and capitulationism". In turn, the CPUSA accused the ACP of being a populist party that is "superficially left-wing but actually right-wing", and "a product of a red-brown alliance". Comparing the two parties, Xu Yanchun of the Renmin University of China states that the two visibly differ in that while the CPUSA primarily claims the legacy of Marx, Engels, and Lenin, the ACP instead relies on the doctrines of Joseph Stalin and Mao Zedong as its ideological framework. The CPUSA does not mention Stalin or Mao at all in its program.

ACP's political position is disputed. Some commentators argue that ACP and MAGA Communism contains both left-wing and right-wing elements. Mundiario described MAGA Communists as "communist conservatives" who "mix Marxism–Leninism with Trumpist nationalism", resulting in a "strange and marginal ideological alliance". Tamar Kikacheishvili, graduate student at Linnaeus University, argued that MAGA Communism is "a bizarre online movement that blends radical leftist ideas with right-wing nationalism". Jordyn Haime of the China Media Project argued that MAGA Communism combines "right-wing nationalism and nativism" with the "far-left authoritarianism of the Chinese Communist Party". Julia Steinberg of The Free Press described the ACP as "a new branch of the radical right that sticks ideas from the left and the right into a blender". Bárbara Pereira of Estadão said Hinkle "unites elements that, in theory, shouldn't coexist", and described MAGA Communism as the "unlikely fusion" of social conservatism and Marxism–Leninism. Michele Gravino of La Repubblica described MAGA Communists as "red-browns, more Marco Rizzo than Antonio Gramsci." Gregory Fried, philosophy professor at Boston College, describes MAGA Communism as "paradoxical", an ideology that "embraces Dugin, Putin's Russia, pseudo-patriotism, and 'communism' as the rejection of a predatory globalist capitalism". Qin Ming, writing in Kunlunce, argues that ACP has a "superficial left-wing appearance", but supports "American hegemonic chauvinism" and "right-wing positions", yielding "a red-brown alliance" that "has absolutely no connection to Marxism–Leninism".

Some commentators describe ACP and MAGA Communism as leftist. Leonardo Sinigaglia, writer for pro-multipolar newspaper L'Antidiplomatico, described the ACP as a "Marxist left" group, argued that "it is in no way a 'fascist,' 'far right,' or 'ambiguous' party", described ACP critics as "purity fetishists", and claimed ACP's MAGA Communism was proven successful by the "crisis" among Trump supporters "after his clear turn toward warmongering and support for financial capital". Sean Staton, graduate student at University of Connecticut, argues that "MAGA Communism has risen to be the guiding force of the most successful American communist party", the ACP, which "bridged" MAGA Communist theory and praxis "to achieve counter-hegemonic, left-wing goals". Erik Piccoli, researcher at the Institute for European, Russian, and Eurasian Studies, described ACP as part of the "pro-Dugin left". Aleksandr Dugin, the far-right Eurasianist writer and National Bolshevik Party founder, wrote favorably about "MAGA Communism" as proof that a "normal left" exists and can collaborate with conservatives like Tucker Carlson to "crush liberal hegemony". Xu Yanchun of the Renmin University of China, argued that the ACP, along with the Revolutionary Communists of America, "are driving the transformation of the American left" and "embody the evolving dynamics of the U.S. left-wing political landscape". Geese Magazine, a magazine on American communism, described the "majority of founders and active members of the MAGA Communist tendency" as "left-progressive" campaigners and as having "came directly out of the Communist, Socialist, and progressive movements". The Robert Lansing Institute described the ACP along with all other parties participating in Sergey Mironov's April 2026 Sovintern conference as left-wing organizations forming "Moscow's New Left". Vedomosti described the ACP as a left-wing party in April 2026. Theory and Society has described Hinkle as far-left.

Some commentators describe ACP and its broader movement as rightist. Yanis Varoufakis, a Marxian economist, labeled MAGA Communists "neofascists", arguing that fascists "always pretended to embrace antisystemic ideas" until they gained power. Alexander Reid Ross, an anti-fascist writer at Political Research Associates, describes MAGA Communism as being "a far-right agenda placed in an anti-imperialist environment", with a "vitriolic, terminally online, troll culture". Richard D. Wolff, a Marxian economist, likened the MAGA Communism name to Hitler's National Socialism: If "you want to get supporters" for your political movement when "socialism is attracting more and more interest", then you might "grab at hold at least of the name", even though MAGA is "fundamentally hostile" to socialism. Maya Wang of Human Rights Watch described Hinkle and MAGA Communism as "part of a fragile but emerging global coalition that joins far-right elements in the United States, Russia, and China", citing Hinkle's collaboration with and praise for Aleksandr Dugin at a "nationalist" Guancha conference.

=== MAGA Communism ===
ACP has been described as MAGA Communist, an ideology which ACP founders Jackson Hinkle and Haz Al-Din promoted since 2022. Geese Magazine described MAGA Communism's founders by saying "The vast majority of founders and active members of the MAGA Communist tendency came directly out of the Communist, Socialist, and progressive movements [...] Some are academics in history, politics, and even hold degrees in Marxism itself". Despite being promoted by the party's founders, MAGA Communism is not ACP's official ideology. MAGA Communism has been described by critics as "cast[ing] issues such as transgender rights, the climate crisis and racial justice as neoliberal distractions". Al-Din started the MAGA Communist movement to reject an American left "out of touch with actual working people" and associated with alternative sexualities and a lack of patriotism. Al-Din argues that the American left is stuck in "ideologically pure but irrelevant spaces, subjugated by wokism", while Trump attracted working class voters and questioned the "dogmas" of "political correctness" and "globalization". Al-Din argues that Trump, despite being anti-communist, created a movement that can "achieve more left-wing transformations than the left itself".

ACP leaders argue that MAGA Communism is a tool to shift the American working class away from capitalism and toward communism. Bárbara Pereira, writing for the Brazilian newspaper Estadão, states that Al-Din hopes to win over working class voters with MAGA Communism by emphasizing the similarities between MAGA demands and socialist countries. MAGA Communism stresses that communist countries like Stalin's Soviet Union never supported mass migration, had little tolerance for feminist and LGBT movements, promoted traditional families, and national pride. ACP leader Al-Din argues that "communism has always been historically conservative", patriotic, anti-liberal, and "anti-globalist". Sean Staton, writing in Cultural Logic, defends MAGA Communism as a heterodox Marxist–Leninist theory which sees MAGA as "a left-wing, inherently communist movement" and therefore holds that "the American revolutionary subject in present day is MAGA, itself, and it is the work of communists to articulate its needs and conduct mass politics". Al-Din sees other communist parties as captured by the "open society", a "non-state apparatus" composed of "NGOs, think tanks, universities, and lobbyists", which fights to preserve hegemony of "American financial capital". Daniel Vitar of LM Neuquén argues that this effort ultimately yielded a "strange political group that brings together people who hate feminism, environmentalism, and the LGBTQ+ movement".

According to Renmin University of China professor Xu Yanchun, while MAGA Communism incorporates the theories of Aleksandr Dugin and Martin Heidegger, it is grounded in Marxism; he states that "it is undeniable that in this political strategy, Trumpism is merely a means of unification through instrumental rationality, while communism is the ultimate goal of value rationality." In its analysis of Trumpism, the ACP claims that the rise of the MAGA movement offers an opportunity to move the lower and middle classes towards Marxism–Leninism and rebuild the communist movement in the United States. The party aims to leverage the social forces drawn in by the MAGA movement to achieve the class struggle objectives of communism.

In 2024, Al-Din stated that MAGA's anti-globalism "makes MAGA a viable basis from which to rearticulate the relevancy of communism", because "of course you put your own nation's workers first". In 2025, ACP leader Carlos L. Garrido described MAGA Communism as "a vehicle for viralization" and "a communism adapted to the unique conditions of the American class struggle". Garrido argued that "the MAGA working class showed every sign of being ready to be conquered by struggle", so MAGA Communists worked to "show MAGA that they could only make America great again, not through Trump and the two-party duopoly, but through communism". In 2025, ACP leader Jackson Hinkle argued that ACP supports MAGA voters and criticizes Donald Trump, arguing that "if Trump does bad things", such as "bombing Iran" or "not solving the illegal immigration problem", then "people from his movement will abandon him", which is why "MAGA is now surpassing Trump".

Renmin University of China professor Wen Tiejun favorably compared the persuasive power of MAGA Communism to nationalism in Chinese communism: "[H]ow can MAGA be combined with communism? [....] In essence, [MAGA] is nationalism. Consider the Communist Party of China's struggle against Japanese invaders – was it mobilising the masses through communist ideology and theory? No, it relied precisely on nationalism." Boston College philosopher Gregory Fried, writing in Studies in East European Thought journal, describes MAGA Communism as rooted in "Stalin's nationalist policy of socialism in one country in the 1930s", arguing that Stalin's views and policies became popular amongst Russian nationalists after the Russian Civil War.

Claudio Aguayo, writing in Cuadernos de Educación, cited Hinkle and MAGA Communism as an example of the "aestheticization of politics" discussed by Walter Benjamin. According to Aguayo, MAGA Communism is an "absurd project" and an "ideological aberration" as using the slogan "Make America Great Again" does not "magically connect with the reality of the American working class". Aguayo argues that MAGA Communism serves a "postmodern function" of providing meaning through aesthetics and is a "simulacrum", an attempt to escape the lack of meaning in late capitalism. MAGA Communists embrace the aesthetics of Stalinism as "a complete and total culture" with its own art, books, and music, in contrast, Aguayo argues that communist politics requires "radical rejection" of the aestheticization of politics in favor of the "politics of truth". Similarly, Bárbara Pereira of Estadão labels MAGA Communism "the portrait of an era in which ideologies merge without shame, in which coherence is a minor detail, and the power of narrative matters more than the truth".

== Political positions ==
ACP is officially a Marxist–Leninist party, and "upholds a Unified Tendency of Marxism–Leninism and rejects dogmatic, sectarian, and doctrinaire interpretations of its various historical expressions."

=== Domestic affairs ===
ACP's program calls for the nationalization of large corporations; the cancellation of all debts; abolition of the US Federal Reserve in favor of a "People's National Bank"; "AI-driven national economic planning"; "the abolition of the University-Industrial Complex"; a right to refuse medical interventions; an end to "mass immigration" in favor of "population exchanges on a rational and planned basis"; and a moratorium on genetically modified food pending a "comprehensive investigation". ACP supports Socialism with Chinese characteristics and supports the creation of an analogical model of "Socialism with American characteristics", which would adapt to "our nation's history, our values" to build "a communist order unique to the United States". ACP upholds "patriotic socialism". ACP supports anti-fascism, stating that communists must oppose "fascist tyranny", "racist nationalism" and "authoritarian repression". ACP's program calls for the merger of the United States and Canada into one Pan-American "United Republic".

ACP rejects and criticizes "woke culture" and its leaders have declared that "Marxism is not woke". ACP founder Hinkle called himself an "American Conservative Marxist Leninist" and argued: "Communism and Marxism historically have been conservative [...] It's a new era in the West that made it adhere to liberal-leftist values. This is not true Marxism. It's Marxism funded by George Soros". The Communist Party of the Russian Federation stated that ACP "relies strictly on class struggle, rather than on 'identity politics' – the so-called gender, race, and sexual struggles that are so popular today in America and Western Europe." ACP leaders argue that "the most absurd aspects of wokism" were intentionally designed to prop up the "dissident right", which they reject. Hinkle's list of personal political demands included banning "ANTIFA street terrorism", introducing "patriotic education", "pardoning" January 6 Capitol attack rioters, and "deporting" the Bush family, Clinton family, Barack Obama, Mike Pompeo, and John Bolton to the International Criminal Court.

While it has been described as anti-feminist, Al-Din has argued that his political movement is not against women, but opposes the "effeminization" of men. According to Elad Nehorai, Hinkle has a documented history of transphobia; Hinkle stated in April 2023 that he would "protect our youth from trans terrorists and propagandists". Hinkle also wrote: "The US celebrates 'Pride Month' on June 1st. America is run by pedophiles, [while] Russia celebrates International Day for the Protection of Children on June 1st". Hinkle and the MAGA Communists opposed Cuba's legalization of gay marriage.

ACP leaders have described America as "occupied by" a Zionist "international monopoly cartel", and argued that the American working class must ally with the MAGA movement to fight "globalists" like George Soros. In October 2025, ACP leader Haz Al-Din told China Daily that the United States government is controlled by the "Epstein network" to serve "a small private cabal", which is why the US demonizes China (which he argued is outside of the Epstein network's control).

The ACP runs community service programs in the United States, organizing "nearly a hundred food, disaster, and homeless relief drives among other local organizational efforts" since its founding, which party leader Carlos L. Garrido describes as part of the ACP's attempts at "building dual power". The party's community service strategy was criticized by Geese Magazine, which described it as a "full-scale retreat into basic community activism—activism indistinguishable from that which many Democratic Party activists and associated nonprofits do".

== Foreign affairs ==
La Otra Andalucía described the ACP as having "an intense internationalist policy" and "being very active in its solidarity with the Russian Federation, Yemen, Palestine, Iran, [and] Cuba". They support Juche, Nicolás Maduro, and the Russian "Special Military Operation", stating that "Russia remains at the forefront of the world liberation movement".

=== China and Taiwan ===
ACP supports the Chinese Communist Party and opposes Taiwan independence. The ACP aligns themselves with the Chinese perspective on the Sino-Soviet split, and considers the Soviet Union's de-Stalinization efforts as having been revisionist. The ACP supports the Cultural Revolution alongside Deng Xiaoping's pro-market economic reforms.

In a 2025 ACP explainer video, Chairman Haz Al-Din stated that ACP regards Xi Jinping Thought as "a political doctrine promoted and created by the current leader of the Chinese Communist Party that promotes Chinese communism as the latest synthesis of Marxism–Leninism" and further described it as "the most advanced comprehensive development of Marxism–Leninism to date." The ACP also has defended Joseph Stalin and Stalinism, and cites "Marx, Engels, Lenin, Stalin, and Mao" in its declaration. Party co-founder Jackson Hinkle has described himself as a "Maoist", and Al-Din has met with Chinese New Left and Maoist academic Kong Qingdong.

=== Position on United States imperialism ===
ACP is a second campist party that strongly supports an anti-imperialist "multipolar axis" against Western imperialism, financial capitalism, and globalism. ACP chairman Al-Din argues that "all nations today" must choose between "obedience to the ruling financial capitalist class or sovereign, national development". In an interview with the Yevgeny Prigozhin-backed United World International website, Al-Din stated: "The [main] problem [in the world] is what Michael Hudson calls Super-Imperialism, a system in which the United States acts as both creditor and debtor in the global economic system".

=== Position on NATO ===
ACP's program calls for the "unconditional destruction of NATO". In opposition to NATO and the West, ACP and its leaders support an "axis" including Russia, North Korea, Hezbollah and Iran, Hamas, the Houthis, Nicaragua, Xi Jinping and the People's Republic of China, and the Haitian resistance led by Jimmy Chérizier. It also supported Bashar al-Assad and Nicolás Maduro, praising the former as a 'socialist hero'.

=== Russia and Ukraine ===
ACP opposes US support for Ukraine. The ACP supports Russian forces in the Russo-Ukrainian War, arguing that Ukraine represents the legacy of fascism while the Russian Federation follows the legacy of the Soviet Union in providing assistance to socialist and developing countries. ACP stated that the people's militias of Donbass "embody the American traditions of fighting for freedom". The ACP asserts its full support for the Russian "Special Military Operation" and has provided humanitarian aid to Donbass "to make the lives of people there better and help them fight NATO aggression". In May 2025, together with the Left Front, ACP made a declaration that "today, as 80 years ago, Russia remains at the forefront of the world liberation movement". ACP further stated: "The ongoing Special Military Operation of the Russian Armed Forces in Ukraine is the main epicenter of the modern anti-fascist struggle. The multi-vector policy of the Russian Federation, aimed at overthrowing Western globalist hegemony and building a new, just world order – such a policy corresponds to the spirit of the Great Victory and should be supported by progressive left forces around the world."

=== Israel and Palestine ===
ACP is anti-Zionist and opposes US support for Israel. ACP supports an independent Palestine with Jerusalem as its capital. ACP "does not recognize the illegitimate entity called Israel", calling it "the Zionist project, whose fascist character has long been evident to the world" which "has always been fundamentally contrary to the historical process by which nations acquire legitimate and authentic existence". ACP calls for Palestinian independence, stating that the Palestinian struggle "is closely linked to the struggle for sovereignty and self-determination at the global level".

=== North Korea ===
Al-Din has professed that he has "profound" admiration for North Korean leader Kim Jong Un partially due to his alleged "resilience in defending the honor and history of Korean civilization." In addition, the ACP is supportive of the Juche and Songun ideologies of communist North Korea.

=== Lebanon ===
In February 2025, Al-Din, Chris Helali and Jackson Hinkle attended the funeral of Sayyed Hassan Nasrallah the former secretary general of Hezbollah in Lebanon. The ACP promoted the funeral on social media posting that the three figureheads of the party were there "as a show of solidarity to the people of the region from America."

== International connections ==
=== Europe ===
In July 2024, immediately after its foundation, ACP signed a friendship treaty with North Korea as well as with the Georgian Communist Party, concluding the treaty at the house where Stalin was born in Gori, Georgia.

In December 2024, ACP sent 55 boxes of humanitarian aid to Donbass.

In January 2025, Hinkle interviewed Romanian politician Călin Georgescu, who finished first in the annulled 2024 Romanian presidential election. Hinkle praised Georgescu as "the man who leads the fight for sovereignty, Western values and Christianity, who wants to stop World War III"; he condemned annulment of the election as a "coup orchestrated by Sorosist globalists and NATO that blocked the campaign". Hinkle then interviewed George Simion, the leader of Alliance for the Union of Romanians whom Georgescu, who was banned from running, endorsed in the 2025 Romanian presidential election.

In February 2025, ACP met with the representatives of the Communist Party of the Russian Federation (KPRF) and Russian Left Front. ACP and the KPRF provided a diesel generator, food, medicine, and equipment for Russian forces in Donbass.

In April 2025, ACP representatives attended the KPRF's 2nd Anti-Fascist Forum in Moscow, Russia.

In March 2026, the ACP attended the Left Front's international conference together with the KPRF and the Communist Party of Great Britain (Marxist–Leninist) (CPGB-ML). There, all representatives voted in support of a joint declaration stating that "Russia is waging a just liberation struggle against NATO imperialism and liberal globalism", "the goals of the Special Military Operation of the Russian Armed Forces is a necessary step on the path to a more just multipolar world", and that "the aggression of the United States and its satellites against Iran, Venezuela, Cuba and other sovereign states is an absolute and final violation of international law".

=== South America ===
In July 2024, ACP congratulated Venezuelan President Nicolás Maduro and recognized him as the legitimate victor of the 2024 Venezuelan presidential election. ACP leaders Jackson Hinkle and Christopher Helali served invited as international observers and spoke in favor of Maduro.

In November 2024, the Workers' Cause Party (PCO), a Trotskyist party in Brazil, congratulated ACP on the election of Helali as a high bailiff, calling it a "historic achievement for the American left". Despite ACP's Stalinism and PCO's Trotskyism, PCO calls ACP its "sister organization".

On October 22, 2025, ACP International Secretary Christopher Helali spoke at the 9th International Anti-imperialist Conference in Caracas, hosted by the World Anti-Imperialist Platform and United Socialist Party of Venezuela (PSUV).

=== Middle East and Turkey ===
On July 27, 2024, Helali met with the representatives of the Palestinian Popular Struggle Front (PPSF). The PPSF representatives praised the ACP for its "intellectual and political identity" and "its principled positions in support of the Palestinian cause and all just causes in the world", while Helali affirmed ACP's support for the establishment of an independent Palestinian state with capital in Jerusalem.

In February 2025, ACP leaders Helali, Al-Din, and Hinkle attended the funeral of Hassan Nasrallah, the third Secretary-General of Hezbollah. ACP leaders praised Nasrallah as a "hero of the revolutionary forces and freedom-loving peoples around the world".

In March 2025, on International Quds Day, party founder Jackson Hinkle gave a speech at Al-Sabeen Square in Sanaa, Yemen, during which he pledged ACP's support to the cause of the Houthi movement and decried the "terrorist attacks" carried out by the United States against Yemen. Christopher Helali and Hinkle spoke at a Houthi-organized pro-Palestine conference in Sanaa with guests including Adil Abdul-Mahdi, Zwelivelile Mandela, Clare Daly, and Mick Wallace.

In July 2025, Hinkle met with Doğu Perinçek, chairman of Turkey's Patriotic Party, with ACP "partnering" with the Patriotic Party. Hinkle stated: "The Islamic world will unite against Israel and the West will stand against Israel. [....] If all forces that fight against imperialism – like Khomeini – come together, Russia, China, and the Democratic People's Republic of Korea will defeat imperialism."

== Election results ==
ACP has fielded electoral candidates for local offices in the United States. Currently 1 ACP member holds an elected public office and 1 member holds an appointed public position.

=== Local elections ===
Year	Candidate	Office	Area	District	Votes	%	Result	Notes	Ref
2024	Christopher Helali	High bailiff	Orange County, Vermont	At-Large	446	2.50%	Won	Write-in candidate	
2025	Addison Aronson	Arts & Cultural Affairs Commission member	Dubuque, Iowa	At-Large	4	66.67%	Won	Applicant/Appointee	

== See also ==
- History of the socialist movement in the United States
- Communist Party USA
- Democratic Socialists of America
