= Haz Al-Din =

American political commentator (born 1996)

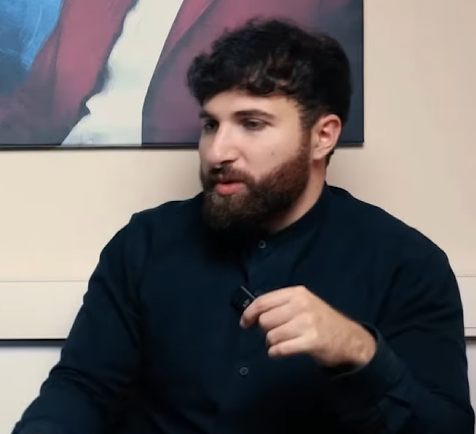
- Al-Din in 2025

Chairman of the American Communist Party
- Incumbent
- Assumed office July 21, 2024
- Preceded by: Position established

Personal details
- Born: January 1996 (age 30) Dearborn, Michigan, U.S.
- Citizenship: American
- Party: American Communist Party
- Other political affiliations: Institute for a Free America (Note: The Institute for a Free America is the think tank of the American Communist Party, the political party which Al-Din serves as founding Chairman of.) (since 2024)
- Occupation: Streamer; political commentator; political activist
- Known for: MAGA Communism

Kick information
- Channel: infrared
- Years active: 2022–present
- Followers: 5.9 thousand

Twitch information
- Channel: infraredshow
- Years active: 2020–2022, 2025–present
- Followers: 17.4 thousand

YouTube information
- Channel: Infrared
- Years active: 2020–present
- Subscribers: 32.4 thousand
- Views: 5,021,534

Haz Al-Din (Note: Haz Al-Din is a stage name used for streaming and for his writings. He has also used the stage names InfraHaz and Haz Al-Ghul.) (Arabic: حاز الدين, romanized: Ḥaz āl-Dīn; born 1996) is a pseudonymous (Note: The International and Jungle World identified Al-Din's real name as Adam Tahir, while former American Communist Party member Danny Shaw referred to his real name as Ali "Haz" Hammoud.) American political commentator and activist who has served as the inaugural chairman of the American Communist Party (ACP) since 2024. He is active as a livestreamer on YouTube, Twitch, and Kick under the Infrared brand, which he uses for political discussion and debates.

Al-Din espouses left-conservative, left-populist, anti-Zionist, illiberal, and Russophilic views, and is a supporter of Marxism–Leninism with particular admiration for the Soviet Union and China. He is critical of positions across the political spectrum, particularly liberalism. Al-Din is known for his harsh, confrontational, and often provocative public image, with Infrared growing in notoriety through debates, aggressive rants about his political views, and clashes with both audience members and fellow political influencers. Some of the views espoused by Al-Din on Infrared have been labeled as reactionary, anti-LGBTQ, anti-feminist, and anti-environmentalist, labels which Al-Din denies.

Al-Din and fellow political commentator Jackson Hinkle are closely associated with MAGA Communism, which Al-Din describes as a strategy which attempts to consolidate the MAGA base away from "false consciousness" and towards communism. The strategy has attracted controversy, with critics labeling it an opportunistic rebranding of communism to appeal to disaffected conservatives. American author Alexander Reid Ross has described MAGA Communism as a fringe movement that attempts to blend conservative-populist rhetoric with socialist terminology. In 2024, Al-Din and Hinkle founded the ACP.

== Early and personal life ==
Haz Al-Din was born in January 1996 in Dearborn, Michigan, to Lebanese Shia immigrants who had fled the Lebanese Civil War in the 1970s and settled in an Arab-majority part of the state. He became interested in socialism at the age of 12 or 13, initially drawn to the Soviet Union's achievements, which he found to be far more sophisticated than what was commonly taught in Western education. Al-Din began pursuing a juris doctor degree but took a permanent leave of absence from law school after completing his first year to begin livestreaming full-time.

Al-Din is a Muslim; he currently resides in Ann Arbor, Michigan.

== Career ==
=== Infrared and online presence ===
Al-Din first became fascinated with Marxism and left-wing politics when he was 12 years old, and in his freshman year of high school he seriously adopted Marxism as his worldview. Initially influenced by Western Marxism and Bordigism, he later embraced Marxism–Leninism and developed an interest in Chinese political philosophy, particularly Xi Jinping Thought.

In 2020, Al-Din launched Infrared, a YouTube channel and Twitch (later Kick) stream focusing on political analysis, geopolitical debates, and criticism of existing leftist and communist movements from a claimed populist Marxist–Leninist perspective. Infrared gained wider attention with the emergence of "MAGA Communism", a term first used in 2022 by Al-Din and fellow influencer and political commentator Jackson Hinkle.

=== American Communist Party ===
In July 2024, Al-Din, Jackson Hinkle, Christopher Helali, and others founded the American Communist Party (ACP) following a split in the Communist Party USA (CPUSA), in which they accused CPUSA of revisionism for its endorsement of the Democratic Party in the 2024 election.

On February 23, 2025, Al-Din, Hinkle, and Helali attended the funeral of Hassan Nasrallah, the third Secretary-General of Hezbollah, as representatives of the ACP.

== Political positions and ideology ==
Al-Din is a self-described supporter of left-wing politics, critic of right-wing politics, and a staunch advocate for the Marxist–Leninist stances promoted by the American Communist Party. Al-Din has said that despite significant disagreements, he has incorporated the "rational kernel" from the philosophies of Russian political theorist Aleksandr Dugin and German existentialist philosopher Martin Heidegger, arguing that their critiques of liberal modernity provide essential insights for constructing a post-liberal socialist order. He holds left-populist, left-conservative, and illiberal positions. While Al-Din has expressed sympathy toward the presidential campaigns of Bernie Sanders, he asserts that the modern Western left has failed to garner the support of the working-class in the United States by focusing on identity politics and abandoning class struggle.

He advocates for a socialism in one country, adopting the view originally espoused by Joseph Stalin that class struggle and Marxism–Leninism must be understood as national in form and internationalist in content. Mirroring Stalin's own views in Foundations of Leninism, he claims that true international solidarity is "based on a solidarity between [sovereign] nations", and that national sovereignty is fundamental to developing socialist movements in individual countries.

Al-Din frequently praises the Soviet Union, describing it as an ideal civilization that sought technological and economic modernization while maintaining a deep respect for its historical memory and culture.

Al-Din supports Russia, China, and North Korea, which he describes as resistant to Western imperialism. In an interview with The Guardian, he expressed "profound admiration" for Kim Jong-un, citing North Korea's "resilience" against Western hegemony. He has called for the complete dissolution of NATO, arguing that the alliance serves as an instrument of Western imperialism. He has supported the Russian invasion of Ukraine, framing it as a necessary challenge to Western hegemony, and has advocated for closer China–United States relations.

Al-Din is an anti-Israel activist and espouses anti-Zionist views. He has expressed support for the Axis of Resistance, including Iran, Hezbollah, and other groups opposed to Israeli influence in the Middle East, stating that they serve as an inspiration to anti-imperialist movements worldwide.

Al-Din is closely associated with MAGA Communism, which is often viewed as a syncretic political movement and ideology seeking to combine Marxism with right-wing populism. Al-Din rejects attempts to label MAGA Communism as a political movement or ideology, but rather describes it as a provocative political slogan and as a populist strategy which attempts to consolidate working-class members of Donald Trump's MAGA movement away from false consciousness and towards communism. Haz al Din, considers himself a Marxist-Leninist and has called for “workers striking” to come together with the “MAGA industrial working class” to "kick out the globalists" like George Soros. Critics of MAGA Communism have labeled it an opportunistic rebranding of socialist ideas to appeal to disaffected conservatives and right-wing extremists, with it being described in The Guardian as a "deranged fringe movement" and by Jungle World as "Not left, not right, but fascist". In a March 2023 interview with the Russian Communist Workers' Party of the Communist Party of the Soviet Union, Al-Din argued that MAGA communism held the lineage of historical American socialist movements dating back to the Shakers and other utopian socialist groups, and asserted that "European communism itself has some origins in America".

== Controversies ==
Al-Din has been criticized for allegedly co-opting socialist rhetoric to advance a reactionary agenda. His MAGA Communism strategy has been described by critics as an extremist movement, with pro-Israel think tank MEMRI describing the strategy as a form of red–green Islamism and part of the broader global anti-Zionist and "White Jihad" movements.

Observers from Vice News and Compact Magazine have argued that MAGA Communism lacks ideological consistency, and is more of a cultural provocation than a coherent political movement. Yale professor Daniel HoSang has described it as an opportunistic ideology that shifts working-class discontent into a reactionary framework. The PERIL Lab at American University has suggested that it appeals to politically disillusioned groups and is exploited by online extremist networks.

In 2022, Al-Din was banned from Twitch after researchers flagged his channel, InfraredShow, for spreading pro-Russia and anti-Ukraine narratives about the Russian invasion of Ukraine, with his livestreaming activities migrating to Kick. A Tech Transparency Project investigation identified his Twitch channel as one of multiple platforms amplifying Russian state-aligned misinformation, including claims about the de-Nazification of Ukraine and false allegations of Western-backed biolabs in Ukraine. The Financial Times also reported on his content moderation disputes, highlighting his involvement in spreading narratives aligned with Russian foreign policy and his subsequent removal from multiple platforms. Al-Din was unbanned from Twitch in April 2025.

In April 2024, Al-Din co-hosted the Free America to Free Palestine event in Dearborn, Michigan, alongside Jackson Hinkle, discussing strategies for influencing U.S. foreign policy and achieving Palestinian liberation. The event, which attracted controversy due to its anti-Zionist rhetoric and alignment with MAGA Communism, was covered by Newsweek for its unorthodox political messaging. CNN said pro-Russia and anti-Israel rhetoric were key themes of the event.

In 2024 Al-Din and fellow American Communist Party member Jackson Hinkle were booed off-stage at an event co-sponsored by the Council on American-Islamic Relations (CAIR) at Emory University which featured pro-Palestinian activist Norman Finkelstein. Al-Din attacked audience members in a speech where he accused attendees of being responsible in the spread of Zionist and imperialist propaganda.

== See also ==
- Jackson Hinkle
- American Communist Party (2024)
