= Sebastian Voigt =

German historian

Sebastian Voigt (born 1978) is a German historian at the Institute for Contemporary History, Munich - Berlin, and a fellow at the Institute for Social Movements, Ruhr University Bochum, Germany. He specializes in the history of the trade union and the labor movement, Antisemitism, (anti)-communism and the history of the political-left.

== Life ==
Born in Ludwigsburg, Sebastian Voigt grew up in Marbach am Neckar. His father was the historian Johannes H. Voigt. Sebastian Voigt studied history, German studies, philosophy and educational science at the Albert-Ludwigs-Universität in Freiburg im Breisgau, at the University of Massachusetts Amherst and the Universität Leipzig. In 2006 he acquired the Magister Artium and in 2007 he passed the first state examination for high school teaching. During his studies he received grants from the German Academic Scholarship Foundation, the Rosa-Luxemburg-Stiftung and the Fulbright program. Between 2003 and 2013 Voigt worked at the Simon-Dubnow-Institut für jüdische Geschichte und Kultur in Leipzig.

In 2009 he received a doctorate scholarship from the labour union affiliated Hans-Böckler-Stiftung and received his doctorate in 2013 at the University of Leipzig with a thesis on the memory and family history of left Jewish activists in post-war France . The publication was published in 2015 under the title “The Jewish May '68: Pierre Goldman, Daniel Cohn-Bendit and André Glucksmann in post-war France” (German original title: „Der jüdische Mai '68: Pierre Goldman, Daniel Cohn-Bendit und André Glucksmann im Nachkriegsfrankreich“ and was very well reviewed in the daily press as well as in academic journals.

In an interview, Daniel Cohn-Bendit underlined Voigt's idea that his Jewish origins had a meaning in the 1968 movement, even if it didn't seem important to him at that time. Since 2013 Voigt has been working as a post-doctoral researcher at the Institute for Contemporary History Munich - Berlin. Among others, he is the coordinator of the Graduate School „Soziale Folgen des Wandels der Arbeit in der zweiten Hälfte des 20. Jahrhunderts“. Voigt is also a copy editor for the review journal Sehepunkte and the IfZ publication series „Zeitgeschichte im Gespräch“. He is also a contributing editor of LABOR. Studies in Working Class History. From 2013 to 2015 he was lecturer at the chair for Contemporary History at the University of Leipzig. Since 2015 he has a been fellow at the Institute for Social Movements and a lecturer at the Ruhr University Bochum as well as at the University of the Armed Forces, Munich. Voigt has written two books, edited several volumes and published many articles. He is the co-founder and editor of the series „Relationen. Essays zur Gegenwart“ which has been published by Neofelis Verlag since 2014. His research interests include the history of the trade union and the labor movement, anti-Semitism, (anti-)communism and the history of the political Left. He has also published numerous journalistic articles and comments, including in the TAZ, the Jungle World, the Tagesspiegel and the Jerusalem Post. Voigt was also interviewed by major media outlets on various topics, including Deutschlandfunk on the death of André Glucksmann and ZDF on Willy Brandt's government declaration in 1969 and the state of the SPD today.

== Controversies ==
Individual members of the left Bundestag faction and parts of their party base criticized the Israeli Palestine policy strongly. Sebastian Voigt and the political scientist Samuel Salzborn described in an essay in 2011 anti-Israeli and antisemitic tendencies in the party. First reported by the Frankfurter Rundschau the article was published later, somewhat revised, in the Journal of Politics. The essay led to a „Aktuelle Stunde“ (current hour) in the German national Parliament, the Bundestag. It was requested by CDU / CSU and the liberal Party FDP of the 110th session. Some members of the party leadership harshly criticized the described tendencies critically, others denied it.

== Selected works ==
=== As an author ===
- Der jüdische Mai '68: Pierre Goldman, Daniel Cohn-Bendit und André Glucksmann im Nachkriegsfrankreich. Vandenhoeck & Ruprecht, Göttingen/Bristol 2015, ISBN 978-3-525-37036-0.
- Die Dialektik von Einheit und Differenz. Über Ursprung und Geltung des Pluralismusprinzips in den Vereinigten Staaten von Amerika (Hochschulschriften). Trafo, Berlin 2007, ISBN 978-3-89626-716-0.

=== As an editor ===
- Sebastian Voigt, Wiebke Friedrich, Christoph Schwarz (Hrsg.): Gewerkschaften im demokratischen Prozess/Labour Unions in the Democratic Process, Edition der Hans-Böckler-Stiftung, Düsseldorf 2013, ISBN 978-3-86593-177-1.
- Sebastian Voigt, Heinz Sünker (Hrsg.): Arbeiterbewegung – Nation – Globalisierung. Bestandsaufnahmen einer alten Debatte, Velbrück Wissenschaft, Weilerswist 2014, ISBN 978-3-942393-71-3.
- Jewish and Non-Jewish Spaces in the Urban Context; Neofelis Verlag, Berlin 2015; ISBN 978-3-943414-44-8. (englisch)
- Sebastian Voigt, Bernd Heyl, Edgar Weick (Hrsg.): Ernest Jouhy–zur Aktualität eines leidenschaftlichen Pädagogen. Brandes & Apsel, Frankfurt am Main 2017, ISBN 978-3-95558-201-2.
- Sebastian Voigt (ed.): Since the Boom: Continuity and Change in the Western Industrialized World After 1970. University of Toronto Press, Toronto 2021, ISBN 978-1-4875-0783-1.
