= Left-conservatism =

Ideology combining leftist economics and social conservatism

Left-conservatism (Note: Also known as conservative leftism, left-wing conservatism, and the conservative-left) encompasses a range of political stances that combine left-wing economics with social and cultural conservatism. Left-conservatism is sometimes referred to as socialist conservatism, (Note: Also known as conservative socialism) though these terms are not necessarily identical in meaning. Left-conservative parties have also been called "left-traditional" (defined by the London School of Economics as "pro-redistribution and anti-immigration/LGBTQ rights"), or "left-authoritarian".

Left-conservatism was the typical configuration for the ideological inclinations of historical Marxist–Leninist states. Often manifesting itself in Old Left–inspired Marxist parties, modern left-conservatism places a greater emphasis on materialism, collectivism, and class struggle than mainstream conservatism, while also rejecting the fight for social justice on issues that are not directly related to the class struggle. Some left-conservatives view class struggle as having evolved into a struggle between civilizations. Supporters of left-conservatism uphold Marxian economics, socialist economics, or Keynesianism, and generally hold negative views on the New Left, immigration, intersectionality, abortion, drugs, bourgeois feminism, LGBTQ rights, environmentalism, or the abolition of capital punishment.

== Overview ==
Left-conservatism often synthesizes left-wing economics and a vanguardist approach to social justice with socially conservative stances, such as the defense of the family and traditional conservative values, opposition to abortion rights, opposition to immigration, and an opposition to the legalization of drugs, sex work, or certain alcoholic beverages. Left-conservatism is often associated with gender-critical feminist, antiglobalist, left-wing populist, and left-wing nationalist political groups. Left-conservative groups typically espouse anti-capitalist, anti-imperialist, anti-Americanist, anti-Western, Eurosceptic, and anti-environmentalist (Note: Not all left-conservatives are anti-environmentalists; some left-environmentalists, such as the Ecological Democratic Party and the Lithuanian Farmers and Greens Union, adopt conservative social policies.) views.

The conservative-left is often compared to the Old Left and is influenced by historical Marxist–Leninist movements. The Marxist–Leninist countries of the "real socialism" tradition were often characterized by a union of communist and socially conservative policies, which their leaderships dubbed in line with the ideas of Karl Marx and Friedrich Engels on issues such as homosexuality, bourgeois feminism, patriarchy, abortion, contraception, and prostitution. The conservative-left continues to emphasize the positions of "real socialism", including class conflict, proletarian internationalism, and social conservatism.

== Per country ==
=== Africa ===
==== South Africa ====
The uMkhonto weSizwe Party is a self-proclaimed socialist and left-wing populist party in South Africa founded by Jacob Zuma. The party participates in the Progressive Caucus led by the Marxist–Leninist Economic Freedom Fighters party. It has been described as a "radical left-wing party" for its support of socialist and populist causes, but is also described as conservative-left or as being part of the right-wing to far-right due to its use of anti-foreigner and anti-LGBTQ rhetoric. The party supports monarchism and looks to expand the powers of traditional tribal monarchs in South Africa.

==== Tanzania ====
The ruling Tanzanian Chama Cha Mapinduzi (CCM) party has been described as both centre-left and conservative. Originally an African socialist party and a supporter of the Ujamaa system, it has since transitioned to supporting a mixed economy, while adopting more conservative stances on cultural issues, including homosexuality and birth control. Social conservative policies within the CCM were especially prominent under John Magufuli, who served as President of Tanzania from 2015 to his 2021 death.

=== Asia ===
==== Cambodia ====
The Cambodian People's Party (CPP) has been described as a left-conservative party. The CPP previously adhered to Buddhist socialism and Marxism–Leninism, before embracing conservatism and monarchism in 1991. Despite the ideological shift, the party continues to follow the "principles of Leninist party organization" and retains a "communist party structure pervading all administrative levels and institutions in Cambodia". The party is additionally considered to have "embedded the legacy of communism based on Leninist ideology" into its party policies, as it continues to use socialist-oriented rhetoric and policies to maintain legitimacy, such as through promoting gender egalitarianism and establishing state-backed organizations such as the Kampuchea Revolutionary Women's Association. The CPP hosted a Socialist International meeting in 2004, remains a close ally of the Communist Party of Vietnam, and most party members are former communists.

==== China ====
In China, orthodox Marxist–Leninist ideological bureaucrats who were skeptical of the Chinese economic reforms were simultaneously regarded as both left-wing and conservative. The left-conservative faction of the post-reform and opening up Chinese Communist Party (CCP) is represented by the supporters of Chen Yun, Deng Liqun, and Xi Jinping Thought within the party. Since Xi Jinping became the CCP General Secretary in 2012, the CCP has pushed for socially conservative and nationalist reforms, including crackdown on LGBTQ+ activism and feminism, and encouragement for traditional family values. At the same time, economic reforms that aim to address rising inequalities and corruptions was also implemented by the CCP under Xi Jinping. Jiang Shigong, a Schmittian thinker, is a "conservative socialist" exponent of Xi Jinping Thought and is opposed to liberalism in China.

According to studies conducted by the Cato Institute and Stanford University, as well as an independent study done in 2022, Chinese citizens who support socially conservative and nationalist policies are more likely to support economic socialism and oppose capitalism; while Chinese who support globalization and socially progressive policies are more likely to support free-market capitalism.

==== Iran ====
The "Khomeinist Left" (Persian: چپ خمینیست, romanized: Chap-e Khomeynīst) or "Islamic Left" (Persian: چپ اسلامی, romanized: Chap-e Eslami) played a crucial role in the early years of the Iranian Revolution, advocating for social justice and anti-imperialism. They combined cultural and religious conservatism (strict adherence to Islamic law and the Velayat-e Faqih) with left-wing economic policies. The Muslim Student Followers of the Imam's Line was a leading organization within the Khomeinist Left, which led the Iran hostage crisis. However, many figures within the Khomeinist Left have become Islamic liberal "Reformists" since the 1990s. In 1991, the left-wing Khomeinist political party, the Assembly of the Forces of Imam's Line, was founded.

In the 1990s, as the "Reformists" increasingly embraced market liberalism, the political space for the Islamic Left was largely vacated. This created a vacuum that was filled in the 2000s by the right-wing populism of Mahmoud Ahmadinejad. Emerging from the Islamic conservative "Principlists", Ahmadinejad maintained a hardline stance on Islamic social values and national sovereignty while simultaneously pursuing an economic agenda of massive wealth redistribution and anti-elitist rhetoric. Scholars have characterized this synthesis as "plebeian conservatism" or "radical conservatism" due to its departure from the pro-market stances of the traditional Iran's Islamic Right. Consequently, his movement has been described as a form of left-conservatism, though within the Iranian establishment, it was later marginalized and pejoratively labeled as the "deviant current" by more traditionalist Principlists.

=== Europe ===
==== Denmark ====
The Social Democrats have been described as left-conservative under the leadership of Mette Frederiksen. Under her leadership, the party adopted an oppositional stance on immigration, particularly in regards to immigrants from Muslim-majority countries, framing it as a response to the perceived negative aftereffects of globalisation. It has also generally downplayed certain sociocultural issues, such as gender and race, in its programme.

==== Estonia ====
The Estonian Centre Party has been described as left-conservative, and the party supports a strict immigration and migrant policy. Against the backdrop of Estonia's economically liberal policies, the Centre Party has a reputation of being more left-leaning. They promote keeping the minimum wage steady while trying to reduce economic inequality.

==== France ====
The views of Fabien Roussel, national secretary of the French Communist Party, have been described as left-conservative. Roussel frames communism as a patriotic French movement, supports nuclear power, and opposes the "handout left".

==== Germany ====
In the modern politics of Germany, the term Querfront is often used to refer to movements and ideologies which aim to combine the stances of the economic left and the conservative right. The most notable German Querfront publications are Compact, which is run by former left-wing activist Jürgen Elsässer, and Manova News, operated by Jens Wernicke. During the COVID-19 protests in Germany, left-wingers and conservatives sometimes protested together against the German government's prevention measures.

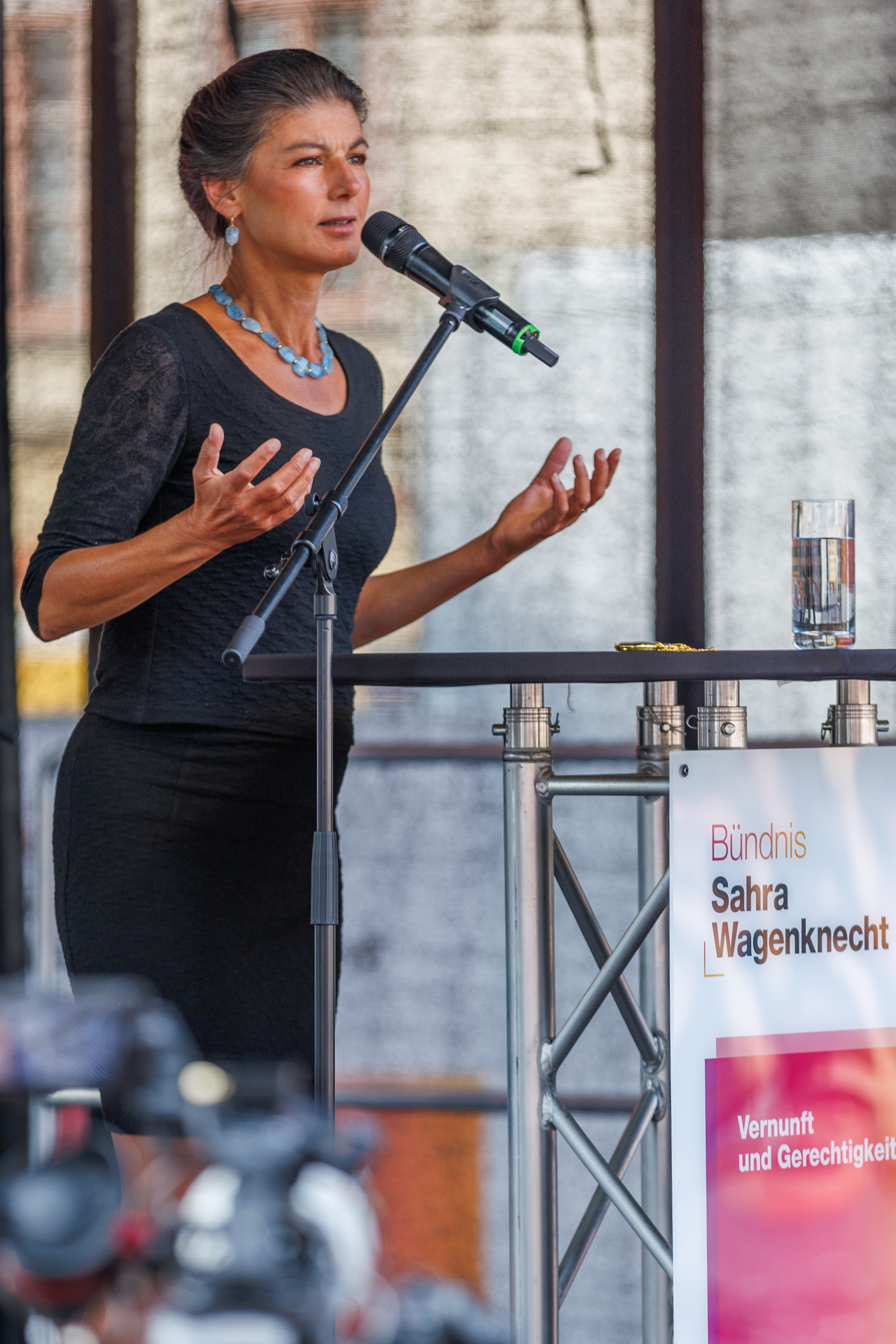
Sahra Wagenknecht speaking at a BSW electoral campaign event, 2024

Sahra Wagenknecht and her Sahra Wagenknecht Alliance (BSW) political party are noted for their "conservative leftist" outlook. BSW's platform emphasizes a redistributionist economic program and policies favoring the economic interests of the working class while adopting conservative stances on cultural issues. Wagenknecht criticized the democratic socialist Die Linke party for ceasing "to reflect the outlook of poorer Germans" and for intolerant "wokeness".

==== Greece ====
The Communist Party of Greece (KKE) rejects the ideas of the New Left, generally maintaining left-conservative and Marxist–Leninist positions. KKE voted against the introduction of same-sex civil unions in 2015, but has also criticized homophobia and discrimination in general.

Despite criticizing homophobia, KKE envisions Greek communist society as promoting heteronormativity and having little room for non-heterosexuals, with the party stating: "With the formation of a socialist-communist society, a new type of partnership will undoubtedly be formed—a relatively stable heterosexual relationship and reproduction".

==== Italy ====
There existed a left-conservative current in the Italian Communist Party (PCI). Italian public intellectual Pier Paolo Pasolini was expelled from the PCI for his open homosexuality. Pasolini himself would embrace left-conservative criticisms of the 1968 movement in Italy, believing the protests to be the result of the Italian economic miracle and subsequent rise of consumerism, modernity, and the permissiveness of divorce and abortion in Italian society.

In 21st-century Italy, political commentators and politicians Diego Fusaro, Marco Rizzo, and Alessandro Di Battista have expressed left-conservative positions and cited Marxism when explaining their opposition to LGBTQ rights and legalization of illegal drugs.

==== Poland ====
During its foundation, the Law and Justice (PiS) party sought to position itself as a centrist Christian democratic party, although shortly after, it adopted more culturally and socially conservative views and began their shift to the right. Under Jarosław Kaczyński's national-conservative and law and order agenda, PiS embraced economic interventionism. During the 2010s, the party also adopted right-wing populist positions. After regaining power in 2015, PiS gained popularity with more populist social policies, pursuing close and popular relations with the Catholic Church. Despite its embrace of the right, the party has been described as "left-paternalistic", and left-conservative.

==== Russia ====
Political scientist Nikolai Rabotyazhev described Russian left-conservatism as an extension of socialist ideologies writing: "the possibility of the existence of a political phenomenon such as left-wing conservatism is explained by the fact that conservative and socialist ideologies initially had numerous points of contact. Conservatism and socialism, in reaction to the process of modernization, rejected a liberal civilization based on individualism, rationalism, and the power of money."

Social scientist Aleksandr Shchipkov argues that in Russia, left-conservatism brings together the socioeconomic principle of social justice with the Orthodox-Slavophile sobornost. Sergey Glazyev, who is considered a representative of Russian left-conservatism, agreed with Schkipkov's analysis, stating that the left-conservative mixes "the imperative of social justice" with "collectivism and sobornost"; according to Glazyev, left-conservatism is based on "a social-conservative synthesis, uniting the system of values of world religions with the achievements of the social state and the scientific paradigm of steady development".

In regards to foreign policy, Russian left-conservatives oppose globalisation and international capital, especially the American one. They state the need for other states to keep much as distance as possible from the "American financial control" and instead pursue protectionism, Eurasian economic integration, and creating new international financial institutions to contest Western dominance.

Rabotyazhev describes the Izborsky Club, a Russian conservative think tank, as being imbued with left-conservative thought, describing some members of the think tank as attempting to synthesize the Russian "red" and "white" traditions. Political scientist Paul Robinson described Izborsky Club as "an eclectic mix of Orthodox conservatives, left conservatives, and Eurasianists", and discusses how all three tendencies share the common core:

Orthodox conservatives tend to focus on opposing what they see as morally dangerous ideas coming from the liberal West, such as same-sex marriage. Orthodox conservatism rejects Russia’s communist heritage, and politically can have a monarchist tinge. This separates it from is what is often called left conservatism, with which it otherwise has much in common. In particular, both groups share a belief that the economic system should be oriented more toward social justice. Left conservatives take some pride in Soviet achievements, and try to bring together elements of socialism, Orthodoxy, and Russian nationalism. They share the Orthodox dislike of Western liberalism, and are strongly opposed to globalization. This leads them to emphasize Russia’s distinctiveness from the West. This last idea finds strong expression in the works of Eurasianist conservatives, who in many cases see Russia as locked into inevitable conflict with the West. […] What all these groups have in common is support for a strong centralized state and belief in the need for Russia to protect its sovereignty and develop in an organic fashion, befitting its national traditions.

In Russia, the conservative-left is anchored in left-wing nationalist parties, such as the Communist Party of the Russian Federation (KPRF), which often mix a strong adherence to Orthodox Christianity and its moral principles with Soviet-style communist stances. The National Patriotic Forces of Russia attempts to unite left-nationalist and right-nationalist political groups in support of KPRF.

Robinson argues that the Communist Party of the Russian Federation is "the most extreme example" of Russian left conservatism, claiming that the party "has developed a modern version of National Bolshevism". According to Robinson, Russian left conservatism is a product of the Soviet Union and is "conservative in the sense of continuing the Soviet heritage." Being staunchly anti-capitalist and anti-globalization, Russian left conservatives consider socialism organic to Russian civilization; Robinson considers the leader of KPRF, Gennady Zyuganov, an exemplary left conservative, given his claims that "capitalism does not go organically into the flesh and blood, the daily life, the customs and psychology of our society".

The term "left-wing conservative" was used by the Russian nationalist writer Zakhar Prilepin in the founding declaration of his political party For Truth.

==== United Kingdom ====
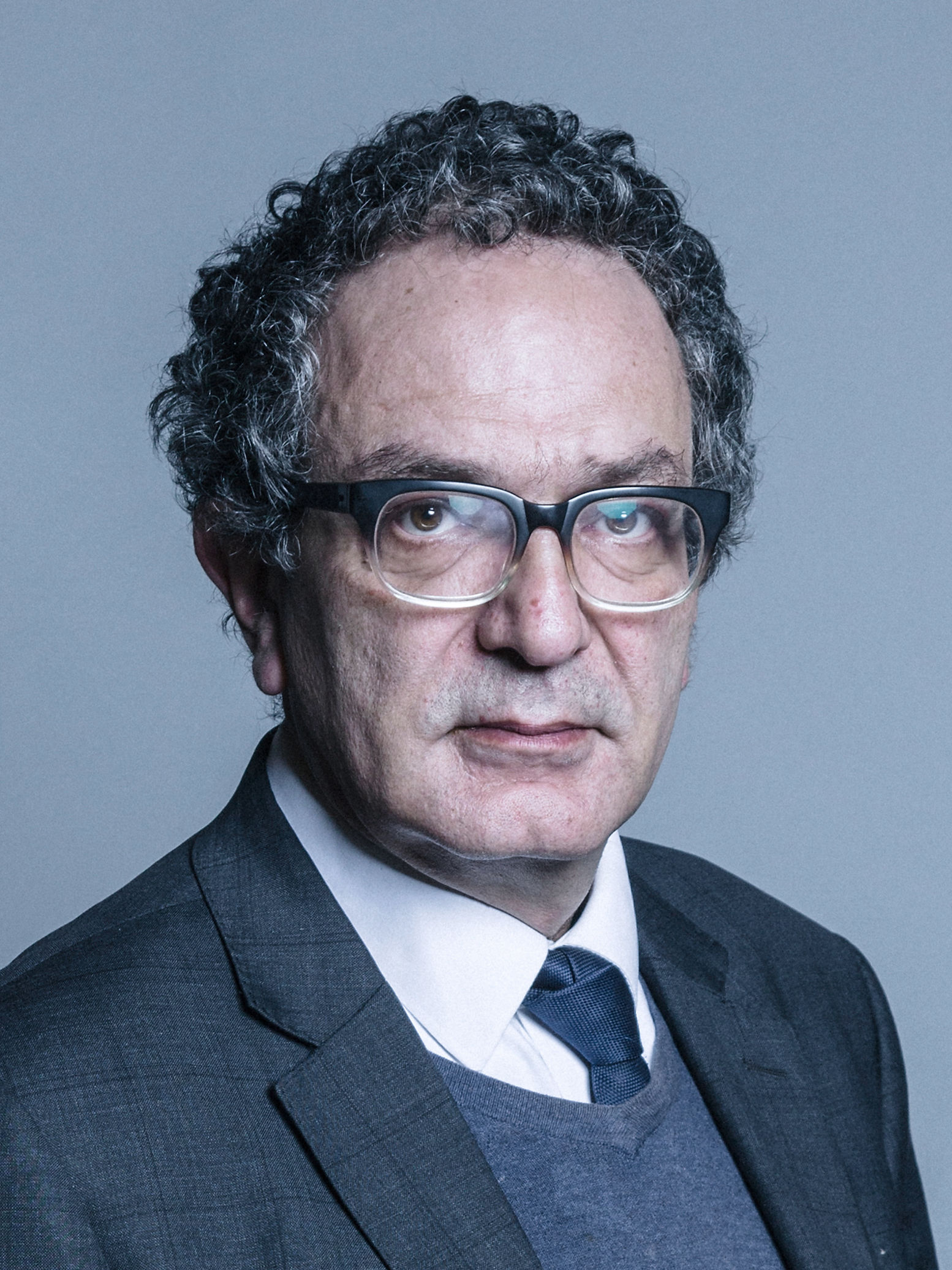
Maurice Glasman, founder of the Blue Labour faction

Historically, the Labour Party included a strong socially conservative element. From its inception, the party consisted of a broad coalition of the more progressive middle-class intelligentsia and the more socially conservative working classes and trade unions. This coalition was enabled by Labour's socialist or social democratic policy agenda and its links to the trade union movement in the era of mass union membership, which enabled the inclusion of socially conservative voices in the party, particularly social conservatives in the working class who saw Labour's socialist and left-wing economic policies as improving their living standards and felt no affinity with the traditionally upper-class Conservative Party.

Labour's left-conservative element was very influential in the party's early years, as exemplified by the rise of trade union leaders like Ernest Bevin and J. H. Thomas in early Labour governments, but became increasingly overshadowed by the more progressive middle-class wing of the party who came to dominate its leadership from the middle of the 20th century. At the behest of the Fabian Society and its influential leader Sidney Webb, the early Labour Party crafted an agenda designed to appeal to the socially conservative working classes in particular, leading to the adoption of a gradualist and pragmatic approach to socialism which continues into the present day, by which the party aims to reform capitalism rather than abolish it. However, the conservative-left started to fall out of fashion for progressivism by the time Labour prime minister Clement Attlee came to power in 1945. Nonetheless, Attlee himself was known to hold socially conservative views, and his government was often criticised for taking a conservative approach on the military, foreign policy and the civil service. Labour also continued to adopt more socially conservative stances on certain issues, embracing patriotism and championing opposition to immigration and Euroscepticism. These were eventually toned down or superseded by progressive stances at the turn of the 21st century as the party shifted away from socialism towards social liberalism in the 1980s and 1990s.

Since the 21st century, the coalition of social conservatives and progressives in the Labour Party has come under strain with the emergence of the Brexit and Scottish independence movements and rising anti-immigration sentiment among the white working class, in contrast to the more accepting attitudes of the more progressive Labour leadership and its pro-European and unionist stances. This has led to a political shift with much of Labour's traditional working-class voting base abandoning Labour and turning towards the Conservative Party and Reform UK because of a sense of disillusionment with the party, seen with the loss of the predominantly working-class Labour-voting red wall to the Conservatives in the 2019 general election. The loss of this working-class base has also been attributed to Labour's economic shift to the right in the 1990s and 2000s under Tony Blair and Gordon Brown during the New Labour era and again in the 2020s under Keir Starmer, which led to the creation of the left-conservative Blue Labour movement, a faction in the party which seeks to promote left-wing economics and social conservatism to reconnect Labour with this base. Despite Starmer's economic conservatism, the Blue Labour movement was widely seen as exerting significant influence over his social policies, including opposition to immigration, an emphasis on nationalism and patriotism, and opposition to transgender rights.

A separate left-conservative tradition existed in the United Kingdom, known as "Tory anarchism", which was expressed by George Orwell and the Independent Labour Party. More recently, the Workers Party of Britain, a left-conservative party led by former MP George Galloway, was founded in 2019, and saw Galloway make a temporary return to the UK Parliament after winning the 2024 Rochdale by-election.

=== North America ===
==== Canada ====
The Parti Québécois, a sovereigntist political party in Quebec with a historic social democratic bent, has experienced a noticeable rightward shift since the late-2010s. In 2019, the party voted in favor of "Bill 21", which banned public servants from wearing religious symbols, including the hijab and niqāb for Muslim women.

The Bloc Québécois, a centre-left Quebec sovereigntist party at the national level, has supported some cultural conservative policies throughout its history, including calling for the exemption of Quebec from the Multiculturalism Act, as well as banning Muslim women from wearing veiling when taking the Oath of Citizenship.

==== Mexico ====
The Ecologist Green Party of Mexico (PVEM), a Mexican centre-left environmentalist party that is part of the Sigamos Haciendo Historia electoral coalition with the progressive Morena party and the Maoist Labor Party, maintains left-conservative and green conservative positions. In 2008, the PVEM initiated an advertising campaign in favor of re-introducing the death penalty in Mexico. During a 2009 interview, PVEM candidate Gamaliel Ramirez verbally attacked an openly gay candidate for mayor of Guadalajara, and called for criminal laws against homosexuality to be established. That same year, during the 2009 Mexican legislative election, the party campaigned in favor of the death penalty for murderers and kidnappers, and for the extension of school hours.

==== United States ====
The Prohibition Party is a political party in the United States founded in 1869 known for its opposition to the sale or consumption of alcoholic beverages, and for being an integral part of the temperance movement.

Although it was never one of the leading parties in the United States, the Prohibition Party was an important force in the Third Party System during the late 19th and early 20th centuries. The organization declined during the Prohibition Era in the United States but saw a rise in vote totals following the repeal of the Eighteenth Amendment in 1933. However, following World War II it declined again, with 1948 being the last time its presidential candidate received over 100,000 votes and 1976 being the last time the party received over 10,000 votes. Its platforms throughout the 19th century supported progressive and populist positions including women's suffrage, equal racial and gender rights, bimetallism, equal pay, and an income tax. The platform of the party today is progressive on economic issues in that it supports Social Security and free education, but is conservative on social issues, such as supporting temperance and advocating for a consistent life ethic. The party also advocates for environmental stewardship.

A study found that that 12% of voters who supported democratic socialist Bernie Sanders in the 2016 Democratic Party presidential primaries voted for right-wing populist candidate Donald Trump in the 2016 U.S. presidential election. Compared to average Democratic Party voters, Sanders–Trump voters were much more conservative on racial and social issues. Over 40% of Sanders–Trump voters disagreed that white people have advantages, compared to less than 10% of Sanders voters who voted for his rival Hillary Clinton. Compared to the average Sanders voter, Sanders–Trump voters tend to be white and older. A CCES survey showed that only between 17% and 18% of Sanders–Trump voters identified themselves as ideologically liberal, with the rest either identifying as moderate or conservative. In the VOTER survey conducted by YouGov, Sanders–Trump voters rated minority groups less favorably than Sanders-Clinton voters; this included Latinos, Muslims, and LGBT people. Jeff Stein of Vox suggested that many Sanders–Trump voters may have been Reagan Democrats who were white and pro-union. Political scientist John M. Sides suggested that many Sanders–Trump voters were unlikely to support Clinton in the first place.

According to a March 2020 ABC News/Washington Post poll, 15% of Sanders 2020 campaign supporters planned to vote for Trump. Citing exit polls on the 2020 South Carolina Democratic presidential primary, Washington Examiner columnist Timothy P. Carney suggested that Sanders voters were demographically similar to Trump voters. In 2020, Brian Schaffner suggested that Sanders' appeal to Sanders–Trump voters was due to his outsider status, his populist policies, and his targeting of issues which affected groups of people Trump attempted to court in his 2016 campaign.

The political symbol of the American Communist Party, a left-conservative party in the United States

In late 2022, American political commentators Jackson Hinkle and Haz Al-Din began advocating for the idea of "MAGA Communism". Hinkle was a Bernie Bro and supporter of Muammar Gaddafi, while Al-Din had held Western Marxist and Bordigist views before embracing Marxism–Leninism. Vice described MAGA Communism as a "swirl of social conservatism, patriotism and subversive energy". Hinkle and other supporters of the idea argued that those who care about the American working class should ally with the MAGA movement, which they considered to be the largest anti-establishment movement in the United States, to incite a populist revolution. When Hinkle was questioned on whether he actually supported communism; he said that the United States can learn from the Soviet Union and Communist China, that Marxism–Leninism has historically been conservative, and that what he described as modern communism's "liberal-leftist values" are a perversion "funded by George Soros". A core belief of MAGA Communism is opposition to NATO in favor of supporting a "multipolar axis", which is to include Russia, North Korea, and Iran. MAGA Communists support Marxism–Leninism, criticize identity politics, denounce American imperialism, oppose Zionism and U.S. support for Israel, and dismiss climate change concerns as "virtue-signaling" and "green fascism".

On July 21, 2024, Hinkle and Al-Din announced the launch of the American Communist Party (ACP), which espouses socially conservative views. The Communist Party of the Russian Federation stated that the ACP "relies strictly on class struggle, rather than on 'identity politics' – the so-called gender, race, and sexual struggles that are so popular today in America and Western Europe".

John Fetterman, a senior United States senator from Pennsylvania and member of the Democratic Party, was described in 2024 as part the American conservative wing of the left for his support of border security and positive U.S. relations with Israel, and for his opposition to the American far-left.

Analysis of the 2026 United States elections noted that many Democratic candidates had taken moderate or socially conservative positions on certain social issues, while taking more left-wing positions on economic issues. For example, senatorial candidates Annie Andrews, Scott Colom and Adam Hamilton all supported restricting the participation of transgender women in sports, with Andrews and Colom also expressing opposition to gender-affirming care for transgender youth.

=== South America ===
==== Brazil ====
Workers' Party member and former President of Brazil Dilma Rousseff maintained left-conservative stances on abortion, the legalization of marijuana, and other social issues.

The Workers' Cause Party, a Brazilian Trotskyist party, expresses a religious conservative opposition to LGBTQ rights and denounced the criminalization of transphobic speech as an attack on the freedom of religion, with a party publication stating: "A citizen can no longer profess their religion if they believe that 'transsexuals' and homosexuals are, in their view, an anomaly and contrary to God's law. [Yet] The overwhelming majority of religions—if not all—share this understanding." The party defends the progressive function of religion, stating: "Marxists, who aren't religious, never said we should force people to abandon their religion. That's absurd! Why would someone do that? They believe in God, they've had their little church since childhood, they were born there [...] If you're active in the labor movement, you'll never go to workers and raise issues with their religion." It also defends Islam and Islamic fundamentalist groups like Al-Qaeda and the Taliban, stating "Islam is not a repressive religion. Generally speaking, it is even more progressive than Christianity. [...] Islam is the religion of countries oppressed by imperialism", and describing Islamist militants, like Osama bin Laden, as "an example of selflessness, conviction, [and] disposition".

==== Peru ====
The Communist Party of Peru – Shining Path (PCP), a Marxist–Leninist–Maoist militant group in Peru, has been accused of opposing LGBT rights and engaging in violence against LGBT people. Between 1989 and 1992, the Shining Path and fellow communist group MRTA killed up to 500 "non-heterosexual" people. According to one woman who was kidnapped by the Shining Path in 1981, a homosexual man's penis was cut into pieces before he was murdered by the group. The Shining Path defended its actions by saying that LGBT individuals were not killed because of their sexual identity, instead, they were killed because of their "collaboration with the police."

The Shining Path has denied allegations of homophobia or overt violence against LGBT people, stating, "It is probable that the PCP has executed a homosexual, but rest assured that it was not done because of their sexual orientation but because of their position against the revolution... Our view is that homosexual orientation is not an ideological matter but one of individual preference... Party membership is open to all those who support the cause of communist revolution and the principles of Marxism-Leninism-Maoism, Gonzalo Thought, regardless of what their sexual preferences may be."

The Militarized Communist Party of Peru (MPCP), an offshoot of the Shining Path that follows Marxism–Leninism–Maoism and Xi Jinping Thought, openly espouses socially conservative and anti-LGBT views. On May 23, 2021, the MPCP carried out the San Miguel del Ene attack, leaving behind leaflets that stated the attack was carried out to "clean VRAEM and Peru" of outcasts, "parasites and corrupts" as well as "homosexuals, lesbians, drug addicts" and "thieves". The leaflets additionally called for a boycott of the 2021 Peruvian general election, accusing Peruvians who planned to vote for Keiko Fujimori of the right-wing populist Popular Force party of treason.

In 2018, the MPCP announced an alliance with the ethnocacerist Plurinational Association of Tawantinsuyo Reservists (ASPRET), called the United Democratic Andean Revolutionary Front of Peru. In 2022, the alliance was terminated over ASPRET's disagreements with the MPCP's alleged ties to Free Peru.

Both Pedro Castillo and Vladimir Cerrón, leaders of the Marxist Free Peru party, have taken conservative stances on social issues, including opposing same-sex marriage, supporting existing restrictions on abortion in Peru, and voicing an opposition to the discussion of gender issues in school curricula. While Free Peru is officially opposed to Fujimorism, IDL-Reporteros reported that the party had formed an alliance with right-wing Fujimorists in the government due to their widespread power within Peru's institutions.

== See also ==
- Anti-globalization movement
  - Left-wing antiglobalism
  - Right-wing antiglobalism
- Postliberalism
- Conservatism in China
  - Socialism with Chinese Characteristics
  - Xi Jinping Thought
- Endokomuna
- Hardline
- MAGA Communism
- National communism
- Old Left
- Querfront
- Regressive left
- Ulusalism
