= High bailiff (Vermont) =

Elected public official in a U.S. state

A high bailiff in the U.S. state of Vermont is an elected public official whose office is unique to local government in Vermont. High bailiffs are elected in each of Vermont's fourteen counties.

The duties of high bailiff are to serve writs which the sheriff is incapable of serving, such as the writ of arrest of the sheriff, and to temporarily succeed to the office of the sheriff in the event of the sheriff's incarceration or incapacity. The position is unpaid. In practice, an officeholder "rarely, if ever, does anything"; in 2016, the high bailiff of Addison County noted that it was not unusual for a person to hold the office for more than two decades without having to perform any official function. Addison County Sheriff Don Keeler said in 2012 that he believed he was the only Vermont high bailiff to have performed an official act in the preceding five decades (when he took over as acting sheriff in April 2012, after the sheriff died in office; Governor Peter Shumlin appointed Keeler sheriff a few months later). In early 2026 the high bailiff of Windsor County, Claude Weyant, took over Sheriff Ryan Palmer's duties following his arrest.

While historically the office has largely been held by members of the law enforcement community, in 2020 several candidates ran for high bailiff on a platform calling for civilian oversight of law enforcement. Three of those candidates won: former State's Attorney Bobby Sand in Windsor County, college student Asa Skinder in Washington County, and attorney and drug policy reform advocate Dave Silberman in Addison County.

In 2024, no candidates filed to run for high bailiff of Orange County, and two write-in candidates campaigned for the post. The winner of that race was Christopher Helali, a social studies teacher and member of the American Communist Party. Helali would move to Russia while still occupying the official role, as Vermont has no residency requirement for the position. United24Media reported that in October 2026, Helali had joined the Russian military, though no U.S. law restricts citizens from serving in other country's armed forces.

== See also ==
- High sheriff
