= Jackson Hinkle =

American political commentator (born 1999)

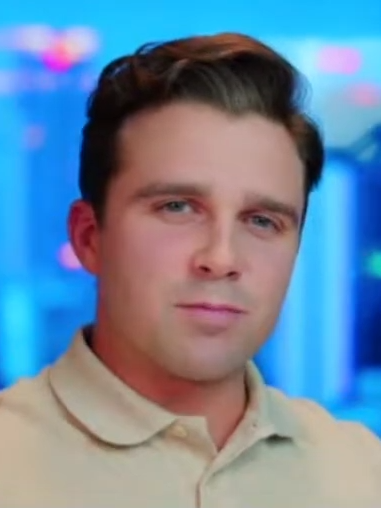
- Hinkle in 2023
- Born: Jackson Daniel Hinkle; September 15, 1999 (age 27); San Clemente, California, U.S.
- Education: San Clemente High School; Saddleback College
- Occupations: Social media influencer; political commentator
- Years active: 2016–present
- Organizations: Team Zissou Environmental Organization; South Orange County Community Choice Alliance; OC Students for City Council; Institute for a Free America
- Known for: "MAGA communism"; Online misinformation; Disinformation
- Television: Legitimate Targets with Jackson Hinkle; The Dive with Jackson Hinkle
- Political party: American Communist Party (2024–present)
- Other political affiliations: People's Party (2021–2024); Communist Party USA (formerly, disputed); Democratic Party (formerly)
- Movement: MAGA communism; Anti-Zionism; Russophilia; Neo-Stalinism

Jackson Daniel Hinkle (born September 15, 1999) is an American political commentator, influencer, and conspiracy theorist who hosts the web television show Legitimate Targets with Jackson Hinkle on YouTube, Rumble, and X. A co-founder of the American Communist Party (ACP), which has promoted policies supportive of neo-Stalinism and Xi Jinping Thought, he is known for his support for Russia in the Russo-Ukrainian War, and for his opposition to Israel and support for Hamas, Iran, Hezbollah, and the Houthis in the Israeli–Palestinian conflict. Hinkle has been accused of disseminating false statements and misinformation on social media, and using social media platforms to support various authoritarian regimes around the world.

Born in San Clemente, California, Hinkle has dubbed himself an "American Conservative Marxist–Leninist". Promoting a syncretic mix of cultural conservative and communist ideas, he is a self-described proponent of "MAGA communism", an ideology which calls for supporting Donald Trump voters but opposes Trump himself for his pro-Israel stance. As such, Hinkle has called on those who support the American working class to ally with the MAGA movement against an alleged globalist threat. Initially an environmentalist during his high school years, Hinkle has turned to promoting pro-fossil fuels stances in recent years.

Journalists and fact checkers have said that Hinkle has spread disinformation and conspiracy theories. His show, The Dive with Jackson Hinkle, was banned from Twitch for violating misinformation policies and propagating disinformation about the war in Ukraine, motivating its move to Rumble. He was banned from YouTube on grounds of disinformation, before being reinstated in 2025. Since the start of the Gaza war, his posts on X attracted virality, with some described as disinformation in the war. His posts and commentary have been cited by Russian and Iranian state media, and he has appeared on Tucker Carlson Tonight, One America News Network, and RT.

== Early life and education ==
Hinkle was born on September 15, 1999 in San Clemente, California, where he also attended public schools, graduating from the San Clemente High School in 2018. He was an active member of his middle school's surf club, which made him familiar with the impact of plastic pollution and became the catalyst for his entry into activism. He became active in anti-plastic pollution movements at the age of 17, founding the Team Zissou Environmental Organization (named after the protagonist of The Life Aquatic with Steve Zissou), which engaged in environmental lobbying and organized volunteer beach cleanups in Orange County.

In 2017, Hinkle became Water Ambassador for The Water Effect at The Ecology Center, and was named one of "The 17 Most Inspirational Kids of 2017" by Reader's Digest, with him also being covered in Teen Vogue as one of eight young environmentalists "working to save the earth" that same year. In 2018, Hinkle went to Washington, D.C., with representatives of the nuclear safety advocacy group San Clemente Green. He spoke at a congressional briefing on the subject of safely dealing with decommissioned nuclear plants, and met with congressional members, an event covered by the Los Angeles Times, where Gary Headrick, the San Clemente Green founder, told the paper about Hinkle: "He's the kind of guy who gives you hope about the future. It's hard to find young people who take these things seriously, but Jackson is fearless and well-informed."

The same year, Hinkle attended Saddleback College, a community college in Mission Viejo, to pursue political science.

== Political and activist career ==
Hinkle began his political activism in the late 2010s, aligning with the "Bernie Bro" movement and running in a San Clemente city council special election in 2019. During his campaign, which was endorsed by the Democratic Socialists of America and Orange County Employees Association, he advocated that the city of San Clemente have its own police department, he "categorically and unconditionally" opposed the legalization of prostitution, and proposed combating the presence and effect of nuclear waste in the area. He was described by Paul Rosenberg in Salon as "avowedly progressive". Hinkle ultimately lost the election.

In 2020, Hinkle launched the political show The Dive with Jackson Hinkle on YouTube, on which he reached 300,000 subscribers by 2023, later expanding to Twitch. The show moved to Rumble, when he was banned from YouTube and Twitch for "harmful misinformation" related to the war in Ukraine. On February 4, 2021, Hinkle announced on Twitter that he had joined the People's Party.

In October 2022, Hinkle and fellow Twitch streamer Haz Al-Din went to Twitchcon, where they filmed themselves "harassing seemingly random attendees" and mocked topics like COVID-19 face masking, support for Ukraine, and calls for online content moderation. A few days later, the two were joined by "Dark MAGA" streamer Jon Zherka in their attempts to engage with UCLA students on campus.

In June 2023, Hinkle spoke at the Rage Against the War Machine rally in Washington, D.C., which included the involvement of the Libertarian Party, the People's Party, and the far-right conspiratorial LaRouche movement, among others, amplifying Russian disinformation narratives and demanding an end to Western support for Ukraine and to NATO's existence. At the rally, Hinkle expressed support for Russia's invasion of Ukraine.

In February 2024, Hinkle appeared on NewsNation anchor Chris Cuomo's podcast, being described as at the forefront of "political thought in the country" for the next-generation, and according to Mediaite, advocated for "cessation of all American aid to Israel". Cuomo defended his interview with Hinkle saying "It is clearly untrue that I have ever, or would ever, give any deference to any kind of anti-semitism."

In March 2024, Hinkle began posting on Weibo following a collaboration with Guancha and Fudan University's China Institute. In July 2024, Hinkle participated in a Russian sponsored press briefing at the United Nations, during which he talked about the Russian-occupied territories of Ukraine he visited.

On July 21, 2024, Hinkle announced the launch of the American Communist Party (ACP) – a political party where he serves on the Plenary Council. The party describes itself as "[a] reconstitution of the Communist Party USA." Hinkle had previously stated that he had been expelled from the Communist Party USA, though his membership in the party was disputed by party officials. Later in July, Hinkle was invited as an international observer to the 2024 Venezuelan presidential election.

On October 7, 2024, Hinkle launched a new political show, Legitimate Targets with Jackson Hinkle. In the first episode he interviewed representatives from the Houthi movement.

On February 23, 2025, Hinkle attended the funeral of Hassan Nasrallah in Beirut, Lebanon. In an interview with Al Mayadeen during this visit to Lebanon, he stated that he had been living in Moscow, Russia for the past five months, fearing U.S. government retribution for his support of Russia, Hezbollah, and Hamas. On March 22, 2025, Hinkle attended a four-day Ansar Allah conference in Sanaa, Yemen hosting pro-Axis of Resistance figures, where he met Houthi military spokesman Yahya Saree and made a speech condemning the U.S. strikes on Yemen.

In July 2026, Hinkle attended the state funeral of Ali Khamenei in Tehran, Iran, leading a crowd in a chant of "down with the USA".

== Conspiracy theories and misinformation ==
Hinkle has a history of publishing misinformation, disinformation, and conspiracy theories, and The Dive with Jackson Hinkle has also been a source of controversy. In April 2022, the Tech Transparency Project stated that the show was peddling "Putin propaganda" in violation of the site rules of Twitch, where the show was hosted on. The show violated the three new policies outlined by Twitch, namely "(1) persistently sharing (2) widely disproven and broadly shared (3) harmful misinformation topics, such as conspiracies that promote violence." The show was eventually taken off Twitch and YouTube for misinformation about the war in Ukraine.

According to AFP Fact Check, Hinkle has a history of posting pro-Russian and far-right commentary. After being deplatformed from other social media services, Hinkle attracted attention for his tweets regarding the Gaza war, gaining 1.4 million followers on X by October 2023, and has been labeled by The Jewish Chronicle as one of the "most viral misinformation spreaders" in regards to the conflict. In response to being characterized as part of a group of online reactionaries leveraging pro-Palestine views for clout and money, he once proclaimed: "I do everything for the clout, you will never see me do something not for the clout." Chinese state media outlet The Paper called Hinkle a "spreader of false information", although some advocates close to the Chinese Communist Party have promoted him.

Hinkle's tweeting style has come into question, with much of it being criticized as misinformation as well as misleading. His posts have been cited and referenced repeatedly by Russian and Iranian state-affiliated media. For example, the Russian news outlet Lenta.ru used a headline quoting Hinkle's suggestion that the 2023 Ukrainian counteroffensive be labeled as a suicide mission.

In August 2023, Bloomberg reported that Hinkle had requested antisemitic AI-generated images of "satanic George Soros" using a tool called Midjourney, which a study found to be easy to generate racist and conspiratorial images. A Bloomberg article in November 2023 about misinformation on X said Hinkle was "known for spreading antisemitic hate speech in the past".

After October 7th, 2023, Jackson Hinkle promoted misinformation and disinformation about the Hamas-led attack on Israeli civilians and subsequent Gaza war. The ADL identified him as one of five key far right influencers on X who had used the conflict to gain an audience, whose combined follower count increased by over 1070% in the period, Hinkle reaching over 2.6 million in late 2023. In the wake of the Israel–Hamas conflict, Hinkle was deplatformed from YouTube, calling himself the "most censored man on YouTube", as well as the "most viral worldwide". With posts reaching over 20 million views as of November 2023, Hinkle reached 2 million followers on X, where he offers a premium subscription to those wanting to help him "DEFEAT THE ZIONIST LIES".

In October 2023, he claimed that Israel had lied about its casualty numbers claiming that only 900 people had died, half of whom were IDF soldiers. The post received over 5 million views, and while Hinkle cited the left-wing Israeli news source Haaretz, the newspaper subsequently denied Hinkle's allegations, although their social media post received five times fewer views. A graphic image from the October 7 attacks was shared on X by Israel's prime minister Benjamin Netanyahu, as well as the conservative commentator Ben Shapiro. Hinkle subsequently claimed that the image was fake due to an inaccurate AI detector classification; however, the image was not determined to be fake by other AI detectors according to DW fact-checkers. The same month, he shared a fake news release stating that the United States was sending billions of dollars in aid to Israel. He also published fake news on the arrival of the United States Marines in Israel, using an image from July 2022 in Romania that was unrelated to Israel. Hinkle followed up by falsely claiming that Iran had declared war on Israel and that Yemen had announced they were at war with Israel. Before deleting his post, Hinkle also claimed that video footage showed Israel bombing hospitals; however, the footage instead showed an infirmary in Aleppo dated to 2016. He also posted an old video from 2018 of a three-year old being detained by border police in Hebron, in the southern West Bank, receiving over one million views.

On November 12, 2023, Hinkle posted on X a photo of a woman near a demolished building, with the caption: "You CANNOT BREAK the Palestinian spirit." Fact checking discovered that the captioned photo, which showed a woman stepping down the stairs of a demolished building, was not from Palestine but from Syria, and had been submitted in 2020 for the Siena International Photo Awards.

In December 2023, Hinkle called for a boycott of the video game Grand Theft Auto VI, linking the game to Zionism. Vice disputed the game's links to Zionism and described them as a conspiracy theory.

In July 2024, Hinkle was one of the main social media influencers sharing a fake story about Olena Zelenska, the First Lady of Ukraine, purchasing a Bugatti.

After the September 2026 incident on flydubai Flight 1073 in which the first officer was subdued after attempting to stab the pilot of a flight from Dubai to Tel Aviv, a post from Hinkle on X viewed more than 1.5 million times implied that the circumstances were "all too predictable", citing a mix of factual and unsubstantiated claims that Israeli prime minister Benjamin Netanyahu had just been in the UAE, had warned about an incident before the forthcoming legislative election and that there were Israeli special ops onboard prepared to overcome the attacker, which could then be used by Netanyahu to cancel elections.

== Views ==
As a young man, before embracing his current positions as a social media influencer, Hinkle was an admirer of Senator Bernie Sanders and an environmentalist.

Hinkle has been variously described as far-right, right-wing, conservative, "a pro-Putin propaganda machine", "pro-Trump", "the most famous American communist today", and an "extreme left-wing ideologue", primarily in his roles as a social media influencer and political commentator, but also as an Internet troll and YouTuber. Hinkle has described himself as a proponent of left-libertarianism, as an "American conservative Marxist–Leninist", as a Stalinist and Maoist, and as a "MAGA communist". Hinkle has also been described as a pro-Russia operative, and grouped as part of the anti-Israel far-right.

On Twitter, Hinkle described his views in a November 2023 post as "American PATRIOT, GOD fearing, Pro-FAMILY, Marxist Leninist, Pro-PALESTINE, RUSSIA & CHINA, Anti-DEEP STATE, Anti-IMPERIALIST, Anti-WOKE, Pro-GROWTH, ANTI-MONOPOLY, Pro-GUN, [and] Pro-FOSSIL FUEL". In a January 2025 post, Hinkle described his political messaging as supporting "Anti-Imperialism, Multipolarity, [and] Orthodox Communism".

Hinkle has professed admiration for Soviet dictator Joseph Stalin.

=== Geopolitics ===
Hinkle claims to be an anti-imperialist and is an advocate of a multipolar world, consequently supporting several authoritarian states that are geopolitical adversaries of the US.

Hinkle is a supporter of Vladimir Putin. He has been described as vocally pro-Russia and anti-Ukraine. He tweeted that Ukrainian president Volodymyr Zelenskyy is "responsible for every death in the Ukraine war" and shared posts on Instagram that praised Putin. According to Euromaidan Press, Hinkle claimed that Zelenskyy is a dictator who was building a "fascist, dystopian state" in Ukraine, and newspaper Türkiye wrote that he believed the president would suffer the same fate as Osama bin Laden. Hinkle has made an alliance with Russian ultranationalist philosopher Alexander Dugin, whom he met in 2024.

Ottolenghi and Rosenberg said in 2023 that Hinckle is an "admirer" of Syria's former dictator Bashar al-Assad. He has denied the existence of the ongoing persecution of Uyghurs in China and the al-Assad regime's use of chemical weapons in the Syrian civil war. Hinkle has referred to al-Assad as a hero, and he denounced the 2024 fall of the Assad regime describing it as a "victory for the US-backed al-Qaeda". Hinkle takes a pro-Pakistan stance on the Kashmir conflict, claiming that the 2025 Pahalgam attack was an Indian false flag operation.

According to the Middle East Media Research Institute, he is a supporter of Muammar Gaddafi's Pan-Africanist Third International Theory. He has called on Ibrahim Traoré and other leaders of the Coup Belt in Sahelian Africa to develop nuclear weapons. MEMRI says Hinkle has been accused by some elements of the MAGA movement of promoting anti-white racism due to his support of South African black nationalist and communist politician Julius Malema and the Economic Freedom Fighters (EFF) party.

In March 2025, Hinkle posted that Trump “should be doing TARGETED STRIKES on Kiev, London, Brussels & Paris — NOT YEMEN!”

Hinkle is an anti-Zionist. He views Israel as part of a “globalist” deep state network and espouses views consistent with the ZOG conspiracy theory. He has urged the Republican Party (GOP) to reject Zionism, and called for MAGA-aligned GOP Representative Jim Jordan to focus on American domestic issues rather than backing military aid to Israel. During the Gaza war, Hinkle associated himself with the Pro-Palestinian cause in order to amplify his reach, generating a surge in visibility that saw his X follower count going from 500,000 to 2.5 million. This showed a division within the MAGA movement, with Hinkle criticizing the likes of conservative pundit Ben Shapiro and Trumpist activist Laura Loomer for supporting Israel.

=== Social conservatism and conspiracy theories ===
Emanuele Ottolenghi and Marina Rosenberg, a senior fellow at the Foundation for Defense of Democracies and the senior vice-president for international affairs at the Anti-Defamation League, respectively, wrote in 2023 that Hinkle is a "known conspiracy theorist". In 2022, just after Russia's invasion of Ukraine, Hinkle posted: “The media lied to you every day for two straight years about Covid. Why would you believe anything they’re telling you about Russia & Ukraine?” In 2024, he asserted on Instagram that Ukraine was behind a terrorist attack on a concert hall in Moscow that was actually claimed by Islamic State.

Hinkle has been praised by conservative and far right personalities such as Michael Flynn and Tucker Carlson. Hinkle dubbed the firing of conservative-populist pundit Tucker Carlson as the "end of an era". He was allied to Nick Fuentes in 2023 but fell out with him. In March 2025, MSNBC noted that Trump-appointed Director of National Intelligence Tulsi Gabbard was associated with Hinkle, having gone on his podcast.

He has a documented history of anti-trans comments.

=== MAGA communism ===
In late 2022, Hinkle and fellow political commentator Haz Al-Din began advocating for the idea of "MAGA communism". Vice described it as a "swirl of social conservatism, patriotism and subversive energy", and described Hinkle as coming from "the far-right entertainment playbook by agitating on livestreams". Hinkle and other supporters of the idea argued that those who care about the working class should ally with the MAGA movement, which they considered to be the largest anti-establishment movement in the United States, to incite a populist revolution. While MAGA communism is seen as supporting Donald Trump and Trumpism, Celia Fernández of El País wrote, "they don't fully agree with Trump's political vision. But addressing the working class through him, they explain, is the only way to channel working-class militancy away from capitalism and towards a communist future". In 2024 The Guardian said:

According to an infographic regularly recirculated by Hinkle, proposed Maga communist policies include “dismantling big tech”, banning “antifa street terrorism”, ending “woke academia” and subsidizing gyms in every community. They also propose exiting Nato; deporting the Obamas, Bushes and Clintons to the International Criminal Court; ending “open borders”; and “putting banking into the hands of the people”.

Interviewed by One America News Network host Addison Smith in September 2022, Hinkle echoed conspiracy theories about George Soros while defending his MAGA communism ideology, saying: "Communism and Marxism historically have been conservative. It's a new era in the West that has made it adhere to liberal-leftist values. This is not true Marxism. It's Marxism funded by George Soros. They don't want communists, left-wing populists, right-wing populists, uniting on common issues to fight the deep state."

The Guardian notes that Hinkle and al-Din's "links to communism are tenuous at best, but they may be opportunistically emphasizing the label". When Hinkle was questioned on whether he actually supported communism; he said that the United States can learn from the Soviet Union and Communist China, that Marxism–Leninism has historically been conservative, and that what he described as modern communism's "liberal-leftist values" are a perversion "funded by George Soros".

One of the core beliefs of MAGA communism is opposition to NATO in favor of supporting a "multipolar axis", which is to include Russia, North Korea, and the Islamic Republic of Iran. MAGA communists criticize liberal identity politics, denounce American imperialism, and dismiss climate change concerns as "virtue-signaling" and "green fascism". They consider themselves Marxist–Leninists and are opposed to the social-democratic and "woke" left. MAGA communism also opposes feminism, environmentalism, and the LGBTQ movement; it seeks to combat "negative developments in society", which they list as "the decline of basic masculine virtues", "the rise of a kind of effeminization, especially among men", and "trans terrorists and propagandists".

The model of communism followed by MAGA communists is that of the Chinese Communist Party. Hinkle stated: "What we're trying to do as MAGA communists is show American youth that yes, communism is good. China is its embodiment, and we should respect them and also try to work with them instead of going to war with them." MAGA communists consider themselves post-liberal and illiberal, arguing that liberalism is no longer a progressive ideology, but rather became the doctrine of the American ruling class; because of this, MAGA communists declare their support for anti-liberal movements regardless of their political orientation. MAGA communists also support the Chavistas, the government of the People's Republic of China, and Palestine, regardless of whether it is Hamas-led or not. MAGA communists admire Vladimir Putin, Bashar al-Assad, Nicolás Maduro, and Kim Jong-Un, as well as Joseph Stalin – because of this, MAGA communism has been described as a form of Stalinism.

On July 21, 2024, Hinkle and Al-Din announced the launch of the American Communist Party (ACP), described by The FP as a MAGA communist party. The party positions itself as a patriotic and anti-revisionist alternative to the Communist Party USA. The party has been met with criticism from some elements of the MAGA movement, notably Trumpist activist Laura Loomer, who described it in an X post as anti-Trump, pro-Iran, and linked to the Open Society Foundation, and additionally called for Hinkle's arrest.

Left-wing critics have described MAGA communism as an alt-right ideology which seeks to combine aspects of "authoritarian MAGA" with "tankie communism", eschew communism's leftist values, and co-opt socialism. Ana Kasparian of The Young Turks said of MAGA communism: "We should be careful [when discussing MAGA communism], because when you think of Nazis and fascists and how they brought people over to their sides. They co-opted socialist rhetoric to bring people in, and then their 'populist' movement was what? Extermination."

MAGA communism has been described as lacking ideological consistency and focusing its appeal to people disillusioned with modern American liberalism. Daniel HoSang, a professor at Yale University and an expert on modern American right-wing movements, said:

It doesn't necessarily mean communism in the literal sense of, say, demanding collective ownership. I think it's meant to be a kind of cultural invocation—a defense from that which the elites want you to believe. It suggests something about how people's political moorings are unsettled, and the search to find new bearings.

Brian Hughes, the associate director of the Polarization and Extremism Research and Innovation Lab (PERIL) at American University, said:

"Various figures are trying to take advantage of the moment. Skull-mask [neo-fascist] networks, and accelerationist networks more broadly, have been juicing MAGA Communism because they like to inhabit odd, esoteric subcultures. They're smaller and easier to exploit. It helps that MAGA Communism has little ideological consistency, and can vibe with people who want to be edgy, on the political fringe."

Kathleen Hayes, a former leftist and now Zionist, rejected characterising MAGA communism as right-wing or far-right and instead described MAGA communists as "[genuine] creatures of the left" who repeat Stalinst imagery and Marxist language, although she noted Hinkle seemed likely to cast off the communist label.

Hinkle's movement has also been placed within the context of an American conservatism that, in the words of Democratic Party strategist David Shor, was getting "really very weird", with The New Republic describing it as a movement that "combined American nationalism with praise for another authoritarian leader despised by most Americans, China's Xi Jinping."

== Personal life ==
Hinkle is an Orthodox Christian. He was engaged to Miss Russia 2022 Anna Linnikova and they lived together in Miami, but the couple reportedly separated in December 2023. Hinkle currently resides in Moscow, Russia.

== Electoral history ==
2019 San Clemente City Council special election
Party	Candidate	Votes	%
Nonpartisan	Gene James	8,253	54.92
Nonpartisan	Jackson Hinkle	4,683	31.17
Nonpartisan	Dee Coleman	785	5.22
Nonpartisan	Christina Selter	667	4.44
Nonpartisan	Michael (Mickey) McLane	638	4.25
Total votes		15,026	100.0

== See also ==
- Collaboration with Russia during the Russian invasion of Ukraine
- Russian information war against Ukraine
- Haz Al-Din – MAGA Communist American live streamer and activist
- Eva Bartlett – pro-Assad Canadian activist and journalist
- Guy Christensen
- Patrick Lancaster – pro-Russia American vlogger
- Gonzalo Lira – Chilean-American YouTuber who died in a Ukrainian prison
- Graham Phillips – anti-Ukraine journalist from the United Kingdom
