= Ecology Center (Berkeley) =

Environmental education and climate body

- Founded: 1969; Berkeley, CA, United States
- Purpose: Urban sustainability, Environmental education, Climate change
- Location: Berkeley, CA, United States
- Method: Farmers' markets, Bookstore, Curbside recycling
- Key people: Martin Bourque, Executive Director, and Raquel Pinderhughes, Board President
- Website: http://ecologycenter.org

The Ecology Center is a non-profit organization based in Berkeley, California to provide environmental education and reduce the ecological footprint of urban residents.

== Programs ==
=== California Alliance of Farmers' Markets ===
The Ecology Center coordinates the California Alliance of Farmers’ Markets, a newly formed coalition of farmers’ markets from around the state of California, committed to working together for the betterment of the farmers' market industry.

=== Climate Action Coalition ===
The Ecology Center coordinates the Berkeley Climate Action Coalition (BCAC), a network of local organizations and community members working to implement the City of Berkeley’s Climate Action Plan. The BCAC includes residents, non-profits, the City of Berkeley, neighborhood groups, faith based organizations, schools, businesses, UC Berkeley, and others.

=== Curbside Recycling ===
Ecology Center launched the first curbside recycling program in the nation in 1973. The Ecology Center has since contracted with the City of Berkeley to continue to provide curbside recycling service to residents.

=== EcoHouse ===
EcoHouse is a demonstration home and garden located in a North Berkeley residential neighborhood. Classes, workshops, and tours of the house and garden are designed to teach people from all walks of life how to make their living spaces healthier, more productive, energy and water efficient, and ecologically friendly. EcoHouse demonstrates ecological ways of living that are accessible and affordable to people of all ages, ethnic/racial backgrounds, and income levels.

=== Farmers' Markets ===
The Ecology Center runs the Downtown Berkeley, South Berkeley, and North Berkeley farmers' markets. The markets focus primarily on organic produce, with all of them having imposed a ban on GMOs. The markets host local farmers, many of these small family farms, and food artisans from the greater San Francisco Bay Area, all year round. Frequent shoppers include local restaurants and different houses of the Berkeley Student Cooperative.

=== Farm Fresh Choice Stands ===
Farm Fresh Choice is the Ecology Center’s food justice program that engages low-income East Bay residents in reclaiming their optimal health through youth empowerment, nutrition education, and weekly produce stands. We make fresh, organic, regionally grown, and culturally appropriate foods convenient and affordable. Adult mentors and teen leaders facilitate peer-education workshops that raise critical health awareness.

=== Hotline and Help Desk ===
The Ecology Center provides information on a wide range of environmental issues from toxics to composting to activism. Staff are available to answer questions over the phone, via e-mail, or on a walk-in basis. Staff handle questions on a wide range of issues. If unable to answer a question, the Ecology Center can make a referral.

=== Market Match ===
Market Match is California’s healthy food incentive program, which matches customers’ federal nutrition assistance benefits, like CalFresh and WIC, at farmers’ markets. The program empowers low-income customers to make healthy food choices and benefits hundreds of small and mid-size California farmers. Led by the Ecology Center, it is offered at more than 250 farmers’ markets across the state, in collaboration with 30 regional community-based organizations and farmers’ market operators.

=== Store ===
The Ecology Center operates a retail store specializing in recycled goods and other items that encourage environmentally and socially responsible lifestyle practices.

=== Youth Environmental Academy ===
The Ecology Center’s Youth Environmental Academy (YEA) is a green leadership development program, designed for young people ages 14–22. YEA provides structured, paid internships to youth at the headquarters in West Berkeley. Through programming based on the nationally acclaimed Roots of Success curriculum, youth emerge with content knowledge across the following areas: 1) Health, Food Systems, Food Justice, and Sustainable Agriculture, 2) Alternative Energy, 3) Climate Change, 4) Water Conservation, and 5) Waste Management and Recycling.
