= Alexander Reid Ross =

American author

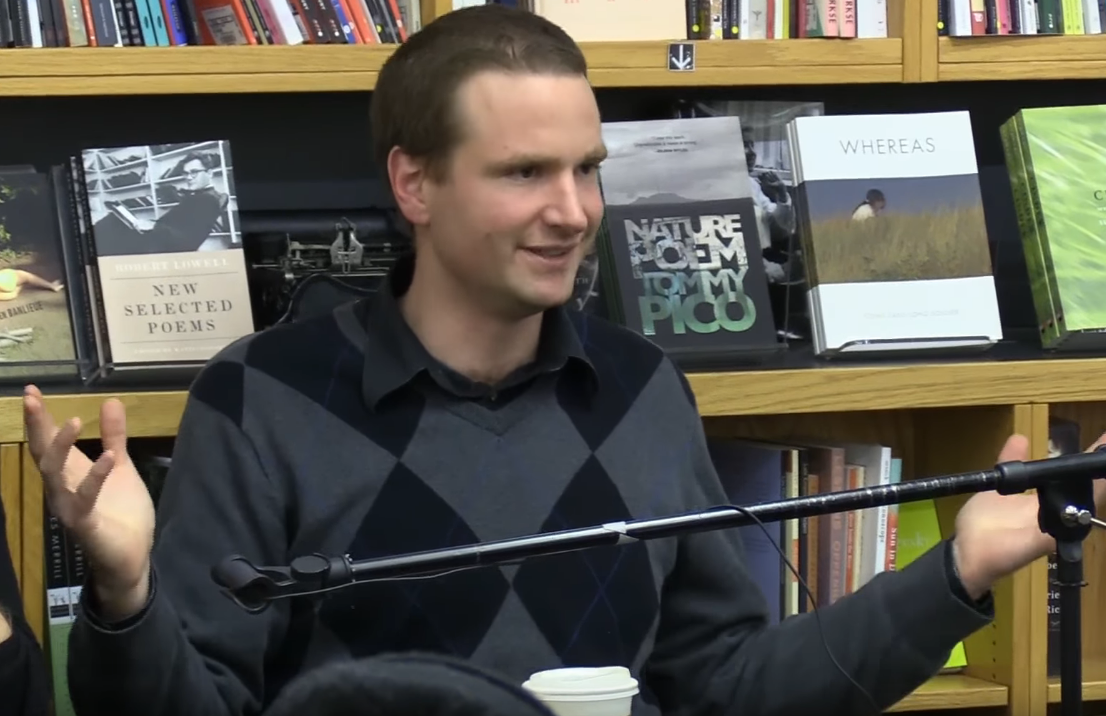
Reid Ross discussing his book Against the Fascist Creep in 2018

Alexander Reid Ross is an American author and adjunct geography lecturer at Portland State University with fellowships at the Centre for the Analysis of the Radical Right (CARR) in the UK and at Political Research Associates. He is author of Against the Fascist Creep.

== Against the Fascist Creep ==
Against the Fascist Creep
- Published: 7 February 2017
- Publisher: AK Press
- Pages: 400
- ISBN: 9781849352444

Ross published the book Against the Fascist Creep in 2017. In it, Ross defines the phenomenon and term "fascist creep", "the crossover space between right and left" through which "at least in its early stages, fascists often utilize 'broad front' strategies ... to gain access to mainstream political audiences." This can take the appearance of individuals who attempt to position themselves as outside of political divides. In practice, this takes the form of rightwing movements appropriating the language of the left, such as attempts by the right to infiltrate the radical environmentalist factions of the left. The book also describes how the right weaponizes detached irony to break taboos against far-right politics.

=== Reception ===
The arts staff of the Portland Mercury, a left-wing or "alternative" publication, listed the book as among 2017's best, describing it as "one of the most thoroughly researched histories of fascist organizing and theoretical lineage from Mussolini to the so-called alt-right of today". The Mercury highlighted the book as both clarifying and subtle.

=== Book tour disruption ===
During a book tour event in June 2017, men wearing "Make America Great Again" hats visited the event including Jamie Troutman, an organizer of Unite the Right. Ross told the men they could stay as long as they remained quiet in the back, which they did. After attendees at the event described the new arrivals on social media, antifascists began visiting the bookstore. The crowd swelled from around twenty to over sixty, according to Ross, and the talk continued without further disruption. The MAGA hat wearers left after the event, and some antifascists followed.

== Map project ==
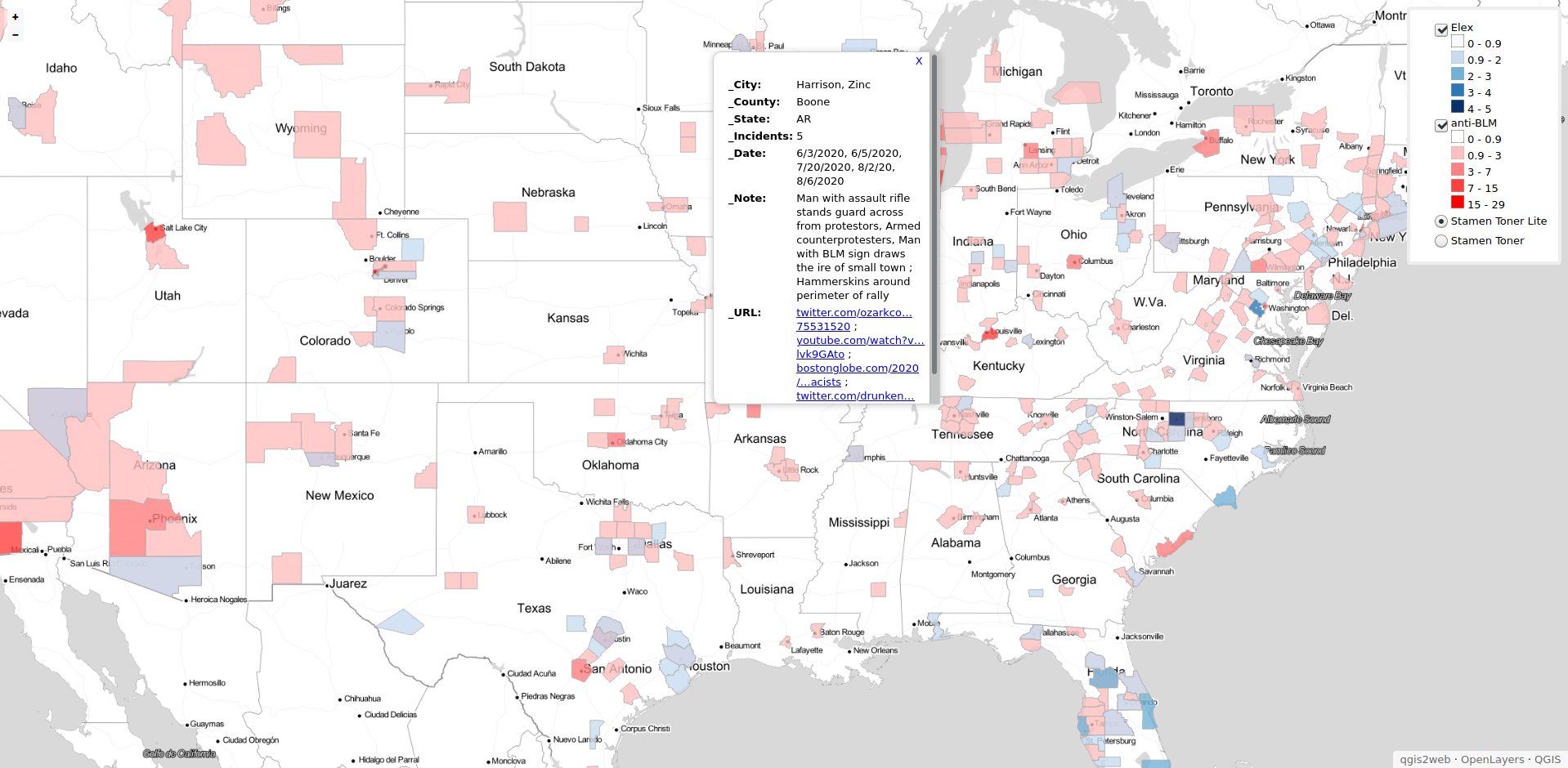
A screenshot of the interactive incident map

Ross began collecting cases in which far-right actors and vigilantes appeared at demonstrations and similar events starting on May 27, 2020. Using this data, he developed an interactive map of the United States describing events and metadata such as involved groups. By early September, Ross had accumulated over 500 such incidents.

By mid-October, he had accumulated over 800 incidents. Approximately 90% of the data is sourced from social media and news outlets. The remainder comes from the Armed Conflict Location & Event Data Project (ACLED), a non-partisan, international political violence tracking group. Ross categorizes over 400 of the events as beyond harassment or intimidation. Ross found that, although vigilante-style attacks and threats had fallen since summer, the proportion of gun violence and vehicular attacks increased. Though demonstrations and violence at demonstrations were both decreasing, the severity of attacks was increasing, Ross found. The project has been praised by the research director at ACLED, and Heidi Beirich.

== "The Multipolar Spin" ==
In 2018, Ross published an article title "The Multipolar Spin: how fascists operationalize left-wing resentment" in the Southern Poverty Law Center's (SPLC) blog Hatewatch. After receiving complaints, the article was taken down and an apology was extended to "those who believe they have been falsely described" as "white supremacists, fascists, and/or anti-Semites".

According to the SPLC, "neither we nor the article's author intended to make any such accusations" and the article was only intended to show "that individuals on the left share some policy views with respect to multipolarism that are also held by the far right and/or appear on far-right media and conferences advocating them". The article described links from members and media of the far-right and the Russian sphere of influence to those on the left. Among those discussed was Max Blumenthal, a former AlterNet senior writer, whom Ross argues has used the guise of anti-imperialism to align with Russian and Syrian interests. Blumenthal strenuously opposed these statements and brought his concerns to the SPLC.

The article was the third in a series. The first two titles were "The Internet Research Agency: behind the shadowy network that meddled in the 2016 Elections" and "The far-right influence in pro-Kremlin media and political networks". After the retraction of the third entry, the first two were also removed.
