= The Ecology Center (Orange County) =

Environmental education center in Orange County, California

- Abbreviation: TEC
- Type: Nonprofit organization
- Purpose: Environmental education
- Location(s): Joel R. Congdon House; 32701 Alipaz St. San Juan Capistrano, CA 92675
- Region served: Orange County, California
- Executive Director: Evan Marks
- Website: http://www.theecologycenter.org

The Ecology Center is an educational nonprofit located in Orange County, California, that focuses on environmental awareness.

== History ==
The organization was founded by Evan Marks in 2008 on a two-acre plot that was once an 1898 homestead, the historical Joel Congdon house. It is well known locally for its annual Green Feast event.

The Ecology Center's "Water Shed" program involves educating Orange County residents about water conservation, and its "Grow Your Own" program builds gardens for local schools. There is also a fermentation lab, a grain lab, and a seeds and soil lab.

In 2023, the center opened its own farm-to-table Campesino Café.

== See also ==
- Ocean Institute
- Tucker Wildlife Sanctuary
- Ecology of California
