= The Failure of Technology =

1946 book by Friedrich Georg Jünger

- Author: Friedrich Georg Jünger
- Original title: Die Perfektion der Technik
- Translator: F. D. Wieck
- Language: German
- Subject: technology
- Publisher: Verlag Vittorio Klostermann
- Publication date: 1946
- Publication place: Germany
- English publication date: 1949
- Pages: 157

The Failure of Technology: Perfection Without Purpose (German: Die Perfektion der Technik, lit. 'The Perfection of Technology') is a 1946 book by the German writer Friedrich Georg Jünger. It is a critical examination of technology and the application of a technician's mindset to society, which it argues creates alienation, lacks human purpose and is connected to exploitative capitalism that does not create wealth.

The book was written in 1939, when Jünger was subject to a publishing ban in Germany, and expresses a development away from his earlier view of humans as ultimately in control of the weapons that technology provides. Jünger revised and expanded the book for the fourth edition in 1953. German editions after the first have been published in a shared volume with Jünger's 1949 book Maschine und Eigentum.

The Failure of Technology was initially met with scepticism among reviewers, who did not regard it as relevant outside of its time-specific reaction to warfare, but it had lasting influence among activists concerned with ecology, criticism of globalisation and sustainability. Later critics have likened it to Dialectic of Enlightenment, The Outdatedness of Human Beings and The Limits to Growth. Its content has been analyzed as related to systems theory and as a precursor to green politics.

== Background ==
Friedrich Georg Jünger fought in World War I and became engaged in German nationalist circles in the 1920s, especially around the magazine Widerstand. In his 1926 book Der Aufmarsch des Nationalismus (lit. 'The Marching Up of Nationalism'), he presented a vision where technology has its own dangerous trajectory, but where human will ultimately controls the weapons it produces. Later in the 1920s, he began to abandon this position. By the 1930s he had a much more critical view of technology than what his brother Ernst Jünger presented in The Worker (1932), which envisions a new type of person who is able to live in harmony with new technology.

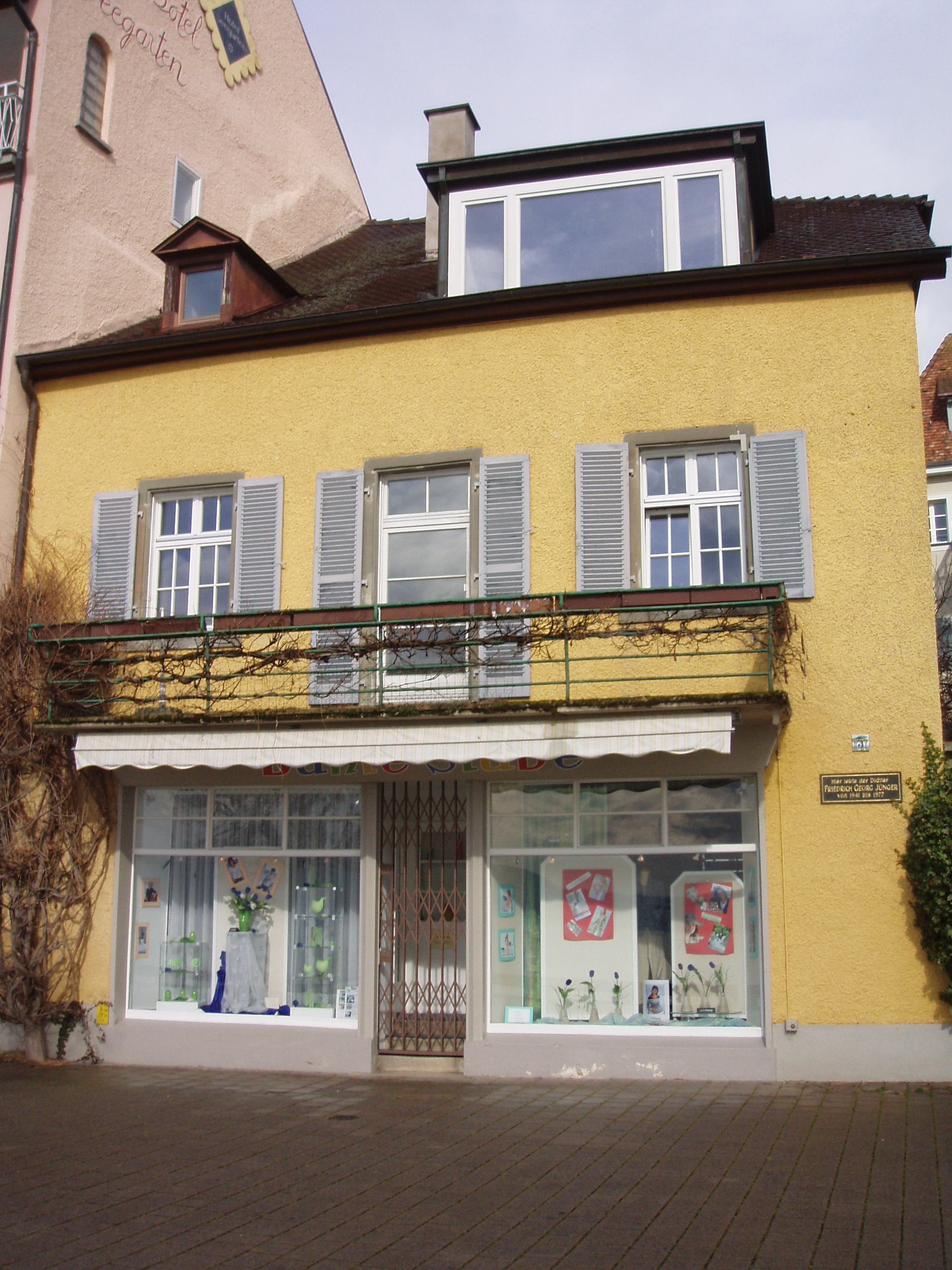
Jünger's house in Überlingen

Friedrich Georg Jünger ended up in ideological conflict with the National Socialist government and expressed this in his poetry, notably "Der Mohn" (1934). He was banned from publishing and moved from Berlin to Überlingen. He wrote The Failure of Technology, which in the original German is called Die Perfektion der Technik (lit. 'The Perfection of Technology'), in 1939. It was an expression of his increasing disbelief in humans as in possession of a decisive role. The book had the working title Illusionen der Technik (lit. 'Illusions of Technology'), which reflects how it also is about Jünger processing how he changed his views of war and technology.

== Summary ==
Jünger presents technology in modernity as something that causes standardisation, conformity, objectification and fragmentisation, and thereby alienates people from rootedness in living human contexts inspired by the past. He analyses the technician as someone whose goal is technical perfection, which, if reached, would mean the end of technical thinking. Having a technician's approach to life in general leads to consumption of human energy that exceeds any wealth it may return for the humans. It leads to automation without any human purpose, mechanises all aspects of human life and reduces people to bearers of functions.

The book connects its theme of technology to capitalism, which it attacks as unconcerned with creating wealth and for short-term exploitation of what has been achieved through other means. Jünger dismisses Karl Marx' belief in technology as a liberator and describes the choice between "machine capitalism" and "machine socialism" as an illusion, because technology is a force in its own right.

== Publication ==
Verlag Vittorio Klostermann published the book in German in 1946. From the second edition onward, German editions of The Failure of Technology has been published in a shared volume with Jünger's 1949 book Maschine und Eigentum (lit. 'Machine and Property'). The Henry Regnery Company published F. D. Wieck's English translation of The Failure of Technology in 1949. The book was revised and heavily expanded for its fourth German edition, published in 1953. Verlag Vittorio Klostermann republished it in 2010.

== Reception ==
Upon the original publication, the book was regarded sceptically in printed media. Stephan Hermlin wrote in 1947: "It is a tragic book. Future people will leaf through it not as a utopia, but as an epoch's magnificently bleak decay product." According to Karl Jaspers, the book fails to reach beyond its own era's reaction to warfare, "which falsely is understood as a natural necessity arising from the matter of technology". Hellmut Diwald emphasised how Jünger used imagery, writing that The Failure of Technology "portrays a condition that recalls the dream landscapes of the younger Brueghel brought into daylight".

The book had a lasting impact on the environmental movement, criticism of globalisation and conceptions of sustainability. According to Jünger's biographer Andreas Geyer, it became a secret Bible in certain activist circles concerned with those issues. Geyer writes that its approach is close to systems theory and groups it with Dialectic of Enlightenment (1947) by Max Horkheimer and Theodor W. Adorno and The Outdatedness of Human Beings (1956) by Günther Anders.

In 1998, the Berliner Zeitung wrote that The Failure of Technology has some similarities with Dialectic of Enlightenment and that the passage of time makes their ideological differences increasingly blurry. The newspaper presented Jünger's book as similar in conclusions to the Club of Rome's 1972 report The Limits to Growth and as "right-wing prehistory to The Greens". In 2000, the scholar Klaus Gauger called The Failure of Technology "a significant achievement" whose "fundamental theses have been increasingly confirmed by reality and point to the insights of the modern ecological movement and philosophically grounded critiques of technology".

Upon the 2010 republication, Jan Röhnert of Der Tagesspiegel called the book "a green classic avant la lettre" and a "stylistically refined, very condensed essay". He described Jünger's perspective as close to those of Ernst Jünger and Martin Heidegger and his analysis as in line with "phenomenological humanism". He saw Jünger's attitude to technology as a radicalisation of Johann Wolfgang von Goethe's, writing that this makes the book useful when technological dependence creates worry and the "grand theories" have fallen. Deutschlandfunk Kultur's Lesart grouped The Failure of Technology with works by Horkheimer, Ludwig Klages, Anders and Oswald Spengler due to its rejection of "Enlightenment totalitarianism", writing that Jünger makes technology feel conspiratorial, because it legitimises itself as man's assistant but makes man subservient to itself.
