= Anton Maegerle =

German journalist

- Occupation: Journalist

Anton Maegerle is the pseudonym of the German journalist Gernot Modery. He is also the author of books about far-right politics, right-wing radicalism, the New Right, and right-wing policy in general.

== Personal life ==
Only very few personal details of his life and career are known to the public. He was in his early 40s in 2002, and lives in a village in Southern Germany, where he always lived except when he was studying social science. During the time of his studies, the German right-wing party The Republicans was founded. He describes this occasion as the “priming” for his activism. He himself is a member of the Social Democratic Party of Germany (SPD). After finishing his studies he moved home and started to make his inquiries. His articles and books are published under his pseudonym.

Maegerle does not publish any personal data because he is exposed to hostility and threats, as well as threats of murder from neo-Nazis due to his professional activity. At times he was dependent on state personal protection. Therefore, he chose a pseudonym under which his articles, book and TV contributions appear.

== Work ==
Maegerle started collecting information on the right-wing party The Republicans in 1983, and observes right-wing extremists as well as right-wing conservative circles in Germany and abroad. Maegerle's database contains some 550,000 items and data on ca. 17,000 individuals, and is said to be one of the largest of its kind, providing information to journalists and governments agencies including the Federal Office for the Protection of the Constitution. In 2001, he published a book against right-wing extremism in Baden-Württemberg together with the president of the Landesamt für Verfassungsschutz Helmut Rannacher. Maegerle also collects information on right-wing extremist, xenophobic and anti-semitic acts of violence, regularly publishing chronicles of such events.

In the past he has worked for the public broadcasting ARD TV shows Panorama and Report Mainz; the Berliner Zeitung ; the Federal Agency for Civic Education ; the news magazine Stern ; and Die Welt Die WELT. He is a regular contributor to the controversial government-funded Internet newsletter Blick nach Rechts (View to the Right) and wrote for the Informationsdienst gegen Rechtsextremismus (Information Service against Right-Wing Extremism) until it was closed down in 2006. As a result of his feature in Report Mainz in 2000 several banks cancelled the bank accounts of right-wing extremists.

Maegerle belongs to the critics of the Ingolstadt Research Institute for Contemporary Historical Research, a portrayal of which he published in 1996 in the View to the Right.

== Honors ==
On 16 November 2007 Netzwerk Recherche awarded Maegerle, Andrea Röpke and Thomas Kuban its "Lighttower Award".

== Reaction ==
Some New Right publishers accuse Maegerle's work of containing a leftist bias because he makes nearly no distinction between conservatives and Nazis, and criticize that he receives public money for this. For example, Maegerle defends the use of political correctness, and published an article in the left-wing newspaper Jungle World during the 2002 German federal election in which he, as a SPD member, accused CDU chancellor candidate Edmund Stoiber of having "best ties to the twilight zone of right-wing extremism". The extremism researcher Eckhard Jesse has criticized Maegerle for "scent[ing] in the well-known Antifa manner almost everywhere right-wing extremists."

In 1996, Maegerle's real name was exposed by "nationalist-pacifist", Neue Rechte politician Alfred Mechtersheimer.

The Holocaust denier Germar Rudolf published under the name Anton Mägerle in order to discredit the journalist's research on Holocaust denial.

In 2007, Felix Krautkrämer, an editor of Junge Freiheit claimed repeatedly, that Maegerle is a far left extremist and he publishes in multiple far left media. Maegerle filed a lawsuit against the claim that he is still publishing in four of the far left media mentioned by name. Krautkrämer, as well as Focus Michael Klonovsky, were later ordered by a court not to repeat this claim.

== Publications ==
- "Rechtsextreme Publikationsorgane und -strategien. Verlage, Antiquariate, Zeitschriften und Internet". In: Thomas Fliege, Kurt Möller (Hrsg.):Rechtsextremismus in Baden- Württemberg. Verborgene Strukturen der Rechten. Dezember 2001, S. 85-101, ISBN 3-89902-019-7
- "Autoren des Grabert-Verlags und des Hohenrain-Verlags. Ihre Funktion und ihre Bedeutung in der rechten Szene." In: Martin Finkenberger, Horst Junginger (Hrsg.): Im Dienste der Lügen. Herbert Grabert (1901–1978) und seine Verlage. Alibri-Verlag, Aschaffenburg 2004, S. 155-174, ISBN 3-932710-76-2
- Globalisierung aus Sicht der extremen Rechten. Bildungsvereinigung Arbeit und Leben Niedersachsen Ost, Braunschweig 2005, ISBN 3-932082-12-5
- Rechte und Rechtsextreme im Protest gegen Hartz IV. Bildungsvereinigung Arbeit und Leben Niedersachsen Ost, Braunschweig 2006, ISBN 3-932082-22-2
- Gewerkschaften im Visier von Rechten und Rechtsextremisten. Bildungsvereinigung Arbeit und Leben Niedersachsen Ost, Braunschweig 2007, ISBN 3-932082-30-3
- "Politischer und publizistischer Werdegang von Autoren der "Jungen Freiheit"." In: Stephan Braun, Ute Vogt (Hrsg): Die Wochenzeitung "Junge Freiheit". Kritische Analysen zu Programmatik, Inhalten, Autoren und Kunden. VS Verlag für Sozialwissenschaften. Wiesbaden 2007, S. 193-215,ISBN 978-3-531-15421-3

together with Martin Dietzsch

- Das Plagiat. Der Völkische Nationalismus der Jungen Freiheit. Duisburger Institut für Sprach- und Sozialforschung e.V., 1994, ISBN 3-927388-44-0
- "Digitales Braun. Die Nutzung Neuer Medien durch Neonazis". In: Jens Mecklenburg (Hrsg.): Handbuch deutscher Rechtsextremismus. Berlin (Elefanten Press) 1996, ISBN 3-88520-585-8
- "Rechtsextremisten und Neue Medien". In: Jens Mecklenburg (Hrsg.): Antifa Reader. Antifaschistisches Handbuch und Ratgeber. Berlin (Elefanten Press) 1996, ISBN 3-88520-574-2

together with Friedrich Paul Heller

- Thule. Vom völkischen Okkultismus bis zur Neuen Rechten. Schmetterling-Verlag, 2. aktualisierte und überarbeitete Auflage, Stuttgart 1998, ISBN 3-89657-090-0
- Thule. Von den völkischen Mythologien zur Symbolsprache heutiger Rechtsextremisten. Schmetterling-Verlag, 3. überarbeitete Auflage, Stuttgart 2007, ISBN 3-89657-092-7
- Die Sprache des Hasses. Rechtsextremismus und völkische Esoterik: Jan van Helsing und Horst Mahler. Schmetterling-Verlag, Stuttgart 2001, ISBN 3-89657-091-9
