= Alfred Schickel =

German revisionist historian (1933–2015)

Alfred Schickel (18 June 1933 – 30 September 2015) was a German revisionist historian and Scientific Director of the Zeitgeschichtliche Forschungsstelle Ingolstadt.

== Life ==
Schickel was born in Ústí nad Labem/Aussig an der Elbe, Czechoslovakia. He attended Kolleg St. Blasien, a Jesuit school, from 1947 till graduating in 1954 and studied history and philosophy in Munich. After finishing his studies he taught at a private school in Ingolstadt. In 1966 Schickel earned a doctorate in Ancient History with a dissertation on Roman legal history. His research has since focused on contemporary history, particularly the history of Central Europe. From 1974 till 1995 he was head of a Catholic educational institution, the Katholisches Bildungswerk Ingolstadt.

Schickel, a Sudeten German, experienced the expulsion of Germans after World War II and came as a refugee to West Germany. Nominated by the Bavarian government, he was decorated with the Federal Cross of Merit in 1989. The award was criticized by the leading German newsmagazine "Der Spiegel" as Schickel was allegedly working towards an exculpation of Nazism. Heinz Nawratil wrote a "A 'Diatribe' in Honor of Dr. Alfred Schickel" published in the Journal of Historical Review.

Schickel has written an obituary for Hellmut Diwald, published in the far-right National Zeitung and Criticon.

== Honours ==
- Dr. Walter-Eckhardt-Ehrengabe für Zeitgeschichtsforschung (1986)
- Federal Cross of Merit (1989).
