= Alfred Baeumler =

German philosopher (1887–1968)

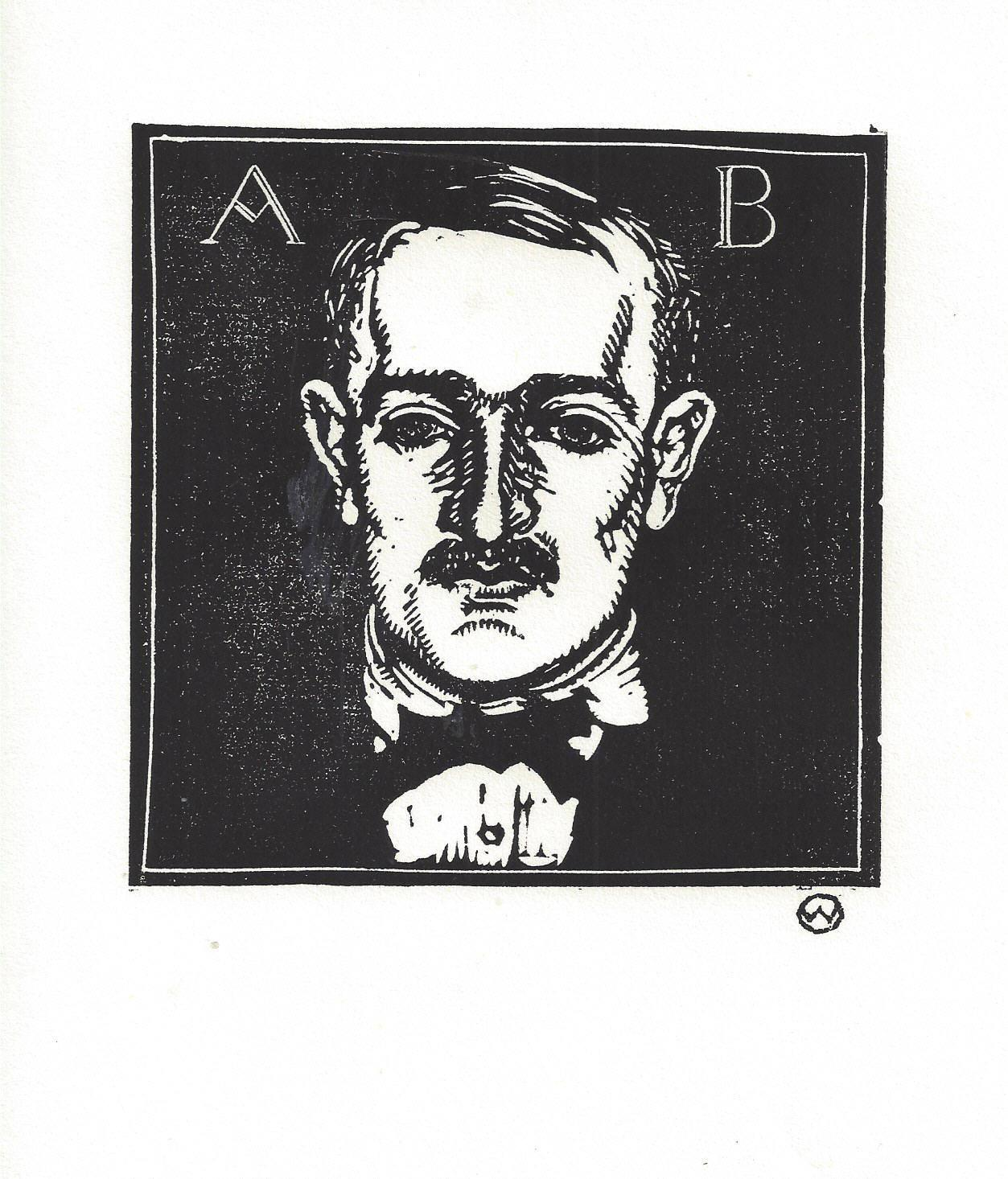
- Portrait, 1914
- Born: 19 November 1887; Neustadt an der Tafelfichte, Bohemia, Austria-Hungary
- Died: 19 March 1968 (aged 80); Eningen unter Achalm, Baden-Württemberg, West Germany

Philosophical work
- Era: Contemporary philosophy
- Region: Western philosophy
- School: Continental philosophy Nietzscheanism

Albin Alfred Baeumler (sometimes Bäumler; German: [ˈbɔʏmlɐ]; 19 November 1887 – 19 March 1968), was an Austrian-born German philosopher, pedagogue and prominent Nazi ideologue. From 1924 he taught at the Technische Universität Dresden, at first as an unsalaried lecturer Privatdozent. Bäumler was made associate professor (Extraordinarius) in 1928 and full professor (Ordinarius) a year later. From 1933 he taught philosophy and political education in Berlin as the director of the Institute for Political Pedagogy.

== Biography ==
After studying philosophy and art history in Berlin and Bonn, Baeumler received his doctorate in Munich in 1914 with a thesis on the problem of general validity in Kant's aesthetics. From 1924 he taught at the Technical University of Dresden, habilitated there and became associate professor in 1928 and full professor in 1929. In 1933, he was appointed by the National Socialist Prussian Minister of Culture Bernhard Rust to a newly established chair of philosophy and political pedagogy at the Friedrich Wilhelm University of Berlin, without the faculty's involvement, and at the same time director of the newly founded Institute for Political Pedagogy. Victor Klemperer commented on the appointment: "Poor Berlin faculty: Baeumler their philosopher, Neubert their Romanist." Alongside Ernst Niekisch, with whom he was a close friend, he had contributed to the first volumes of the journal Widerstand. He contributed to the Zeitschrift für nationalrevolutionäre Politik under the pseudonyms "Leopold Martin" and "Wolf Ecker".

Baeumler was originally close to the Bündische and the Jungkonservativen, but then turned to National Socialism. In 1930 he was a co-founder of the Völkisch and antisemitic Kampfbund für deutsche Kultur. From the beginning of the 1930s, he had personal contact with Hitler and the "Nazi chief ideologist" Alfred Rosenberg. At the Reichstag elections of 1932, Baeumler openly declared his allegiance to the NSDAP along with other philosophers, but it was not until after the party had come to power that he applied for membership.

=== Nazi Regime ===
On 10 May 1933, Baeumler gave his inaugural lecture, "Wider den undeutschen Geist" ("Against the Un-German Spirit"), as part of his college "Wissenschaft, Hochschule, Staat" ("Science, University, State") in the crowded lecture hall 38 of the Friedrich Wilhelm University. Most of the students had turned up in SA uniforms. At the beginning of the lecture, a student flag delegation marched in with the swastika banner. The little-noticed key quote from this lecture was as follows: "Politics can only be made by those who are responsible for it. There is indeed a philosophy and science of politics, but not a scientific politics and just as little a political science. Thought must answer to thought." Baeumler went on to explain: "In a word, it can be said here what National Socialism means intellectually: the replacement of the educated by the type of soldier." The "epoch of freedom of conscience, of individualism" was over. "They are now going out to burn books in which a spirit foreign to us has used the German word to fight us. [...] What we dismiss from ourselves today are poisons that have accumulated in the time of a false toleration." Later, the procession of torchbearers - but without Baeumler at the head - formed up to the Opernplatz. There, according to the Völkischer Beobachter, the "German spirit" was to be symbolically purified by burning 20,000 books.

In 1934, Baeumler demanded the "political soldier" as a student ideal, the establishment of "men's houses" and the exclusion of the "feminine-democratic". Martin Heidegger criticised what he perceived as a lack of depth in both Baeumler and Ernst Krieck, and that both wanted to realise the national pedagogical model of the "political soldier" through external training programmes and military training. Since July 1934, Baeumler had been a member of the NSDAP's Higher Education Commission. In 1934, Reichsleiter Rosenberg also appointed him "Head of the Office of Science of the Führer's Commissioner for the Supervision of Intellectual Training and Education of the NSDAP", and in 1941 he was promoted to Head of Service. Baeumler worked there primarily as Rosenberg's liaison to the universities and also edited the Internationale Zeitschrift für Erziehung and, from 1936, the journal Weltanschauung und Schule, whose editor was Hans Karl Leistritz. His task in the Rosenberg Office, Science Department, was in particular "to work on the assessment of humanities scholars to be appointed to universities and to deal with the fundamental questions of pedagogy."

For Adolf Hitler's 50th birthday in 1939, Baeumler wrote an article in the Festschrift Deutsche Wissenschaft. At that time, Ernst Krieck and Baeumler were considered "the two leading philosophers of National Socialism". From April 1942, Baeumler was head of the "Aufbauamt der Hohen Schule", a planned party university called the NSDAP's Hohe Schule.

=== Post War ===
After 1945, Baeumler was interned for three years in camps in Hammelburg and Ludwigsburg. He was one of the few Nazi professors who did not return to a university post.

== Pedagogical and philosophical views ==
=== "Hellas and Germania" ===
One of Baeumler's more well-known texts is "Hellas and Germania", published in his 1937 book, "Studies in German Intellectual History". The basic thesis of this text is that any renewal for Germany, and indeed the West in general, would require a recovery of the values which permeated Ancient Hellas. As with much of his work, Baeumler made use of Nietzsche's legacy to lend force to the thesis of the article. Baeumler summarised his thesis thus:

"We are certain that only a system of values essentially similar to the Hellenic system will be able to pull Europe out of the anarchy of values. The discovery of the Hellenic world means nothing less than the premonition of a new age, an age beyond Gothic and Enlightenment. For us, the Hellenic is not a value among others, not just something great next to the Roman, the Iranian or the Indian. Rather, our knowledge confirms the intuitive certainty of Winckelmann, Hölderlin and Nietzsche that our fate is decided in the face of Hellas."

=== "Race as a Basic Concept of Educational Science" ===
In this 1942 paper, Baeumler shows how, in the Nazi regime, the concepts of race and heredity have a preeminent meaning. Furthermore, he claims that the concept of "The Malleability of Man" had hitherto been misconceived. This proof, he says, is to be provided by racial thinking. He sees a problem in intellectualism. In his view, intellectualism assumes:

1. That man comes into the world as a pure, undetermined being (tabula rasa);
2. That the environment has the power to write what it wants on this tablet;
3. That the organ by which man relates to the world is the intellect;
4. That man's actions are guided by the intellect and can therefore be decisively influenced by influencing the intellect.

From this intellectualistic assumption, the concept of "unrestricted malleability" would be derived. The science of education does not start from the real human being; the goal of education is the human being as such, as he has never existed and will never exist. The success of education results from the correct application of the means. Without a sound scientific knowledge of man, the theory of education had no basis. The opponents of the science of life and race in education would still be working with a historically outdated science of man. Based on a correct relationship between intelligence and character, a realistic theory of education would emerge.

Therefore, it was of utmost importance to form character and intelligence. Racial thinking would not oppose a principle of unlimited likeness with the principle of limited likeness, but would first "discover" the true principle of likeness. The unity of character does not consist in its static, resting nature, but in its dynamically moving moments. It is the unity of direction. Education follows on from this unity; this unity can never be produced through intellect and environment.

The task of education arises from the relatively undetermined direction of unity. Only through the formative effect of others does the soul attain itself. At the end of education is the clearly defined form of the "type", which can only be achieved through education by the community. With the insight into the impossible concept of "unrestricted education", the concept of any "restriction" through educational measures also falls:

"Limitation is not an invention of racial educational science, but an essential characteristic of the human being."

=== "The German School and its Teacher" ===
In this writing from 1942, Baeumler explains what he understands by political pedagogy. In doing so, he states that the "Dictionary of Compassionate Love" would not be available to the National Socialists. He interprets the word "new", claiming content that never existed in this simple explanation. For him, Pestalozzi and Herbart are classical models that were only surpassed by the "new age". The role of the teacher should be "set in motion" from the political. Pedagogy could not take on this role. For him, historical epochs of the harvest are only suitable for an intellectual content to reach "that degree of its formation in which it becomes teachable".

"The National Socialist age, too, will produce the school that is spirit from its spirit, but we must be aware that we are at the beginning of the new education." Only after the new world view had undergone its "shaping" by artists and thinkers would it be handed over to the school as teaching material. However, the school is excluded from the achievement of the worldview itself. Thus, Baeumler sees the school as the object and mediator of yesterday's shaped worldview. On the other hand, for him the school receives meaning and content from the national community and is thus no longer independent of life, but a piece of national and historical life, and it can no longer escape its laws.

=== "The New Teacher Training" ===
In this work from 1942, Baeumler justifies the teacher training college, which at this time had taken on its final form according to a Führer decree, with "necessities of national existence" and "circumstances of the matter". In this way, he indirectly identifies pedagogy only as a product of Nazi ideology.

For him, the concept of the "camp", where a "pedagogical atmosphere" reigns, is at the top of the list in the training of teachers. Without describing this NS concept in more detail, it is sufficient to mention the vocabulary used: "community life", "experience", "inner participation", "school camp", "readiness", "adoring heart", "miracles", "to talk would mean to break up", "air of educational life", etc.

== Baeumler and Nietzsche ==
At the end of the 1920s, Baeumler began to present Friedrich Nietzsche as a philosopher of National Socialism. As an influential philosopher in Nazi Germany, Baeumler used Friedrich Nietzsche's philosophy to legitimize Nazism. Thomas Mann read Baeumler's work on Nietzsche in the early 1930s, and characterized passages of it as "Hitler prophecy". He wrote a book entitled "Nietzsche, der Philosoph und Politiker" (Nietzsche, the Philosopher and Politician), which appeared in Reclams Universal-Bibliothek in 1931 and was widely read. In the book, Baeumler states:

A theory of the state is not to be found in Nietzsche's work – but this work has opened all paths towards a new theory of the state. … His attack on the "Reich" arises from the feeling of a world-historical task that awaits us. He wanted to hear nothing of the state as a moral organism in Hegel's sense, he also wanted to hear nothing of Bismarck's Christian Lesser Germany ("Kleindeutschland"). Before his eyes stood the task of our race: the task of being leader of Europe. … What would Europe be without the Germanic North? What would Europe be without Germany? A Roman colony. … Germany can only exist world-historically in the form of greatness. It has the choice to exist as the anti-Roman power of Europe, or not to exist. … The German state of the future will not be a continuation of Bismarck's creation, but will be created out of the spirit of Nietzsche and the spirit of the Great War (from pp. 180–183. Italics in the original).

Aside from using Nietzsche to legitimize National Socialism, Baeumler made other contributions to Nietzsche studies. He compiled an extensive volume, "Nietzsche in seinen Briefen und Berichten der Zeitgenossen" (Nietzsche in his Letters and Reports of Contemporaries) in 1932 for Alfred Kröner Verlag: Die Lebensgeschichte in Dokumenten (Nietzsche's Life Story in Documents); and he edited a 12-volume edition of Nietzsche's writings, which was also published by Alfred Kröner from 1930 onwards and is still available today (2009) in new editions. Baeumler wrote introductions or epilogues to the individual volumes of the edition, which continued to be printed in new editions after 1945. Martin Heidegger praised Baeumler's edition of Der Wille zur Macht as a "faithful reprint of Volumes XV and XVI of the Complete Edition, with an intelligible afterword and a concise and good outline of Nietzsche's life story." Later, Baeumler's texts were successively replaced by texts by Walter Gebhard. Only the two volumes compiled by Baeumler under the title Die Unschuld des Werdens (The Innocence of Becoming) with materials from Nietzsche's estate are still in the original version from 1931 in the programme of the Kröner publishing house.

== Works ==
- Weltdemokratie und Nationalsozialismus. Berlin: Duncker & Humblot, 1943.
- Alfred Rosenberg und der Mythus des 20. Jahrhunderts. München: Hoheneichen-Verlag, 1943.
- Bildung und Gemeinschaft. Berlin: Junker und Dünnhaupt Verlag, 1943.
- Studien zur deutschen Geistesgeschichte. Berlin: Junker und Dünnhaupt, 1937.
- Politik und Erziehung. Reden und Aufsätze. Berlin: Junker und Dünnhaupt, 1937. (Collected speeches and essays).
- Männerbund und Wissenschaft. Berlin: Junker und Dünnhaupt, 1934.
- Ästhetik, in: Handbuch der Philosophie. Munich, 1934.
- Was bedeutet Herman Wirth für die Wissenschaft? Leipzig: Koehler & Amelang, 1932.
- Nietzsche, der Philosoph und Politiker. Leipzig: Reclam, 1931.
- Nietzsches Philosophie in Selbstzegunissen. Ausgewählt und herausgegeben von Alfred Baeumler. Leipzig: Reclam, 1931.
- Die Unschuld des Werdens. Der Nachlass, ausgewählt und geordnet von Alfred Baeumler. Leipzig: Kröner, 1931. (Collection of unpublished writings by Nietzsche).
- Bachofen und Nietzsche. Zurich: Verlag der Neuen Schweizer Rundschau, 1929.
- Einleitung zu Bachofen, Der Mythus von Orient und Okzident. Munich: Manfred Schröter, 1926.
- Kants Kritik der Urteilskraft, ihre Geschichte und Systematik. 2 vols. Halle (Saale): Niemeyer, 1923.
- Das Problem der Allgemeingültigkeit in Kants Ästhetik. Dissertation. Munich, 1914.
