= Šatov =

- Market town
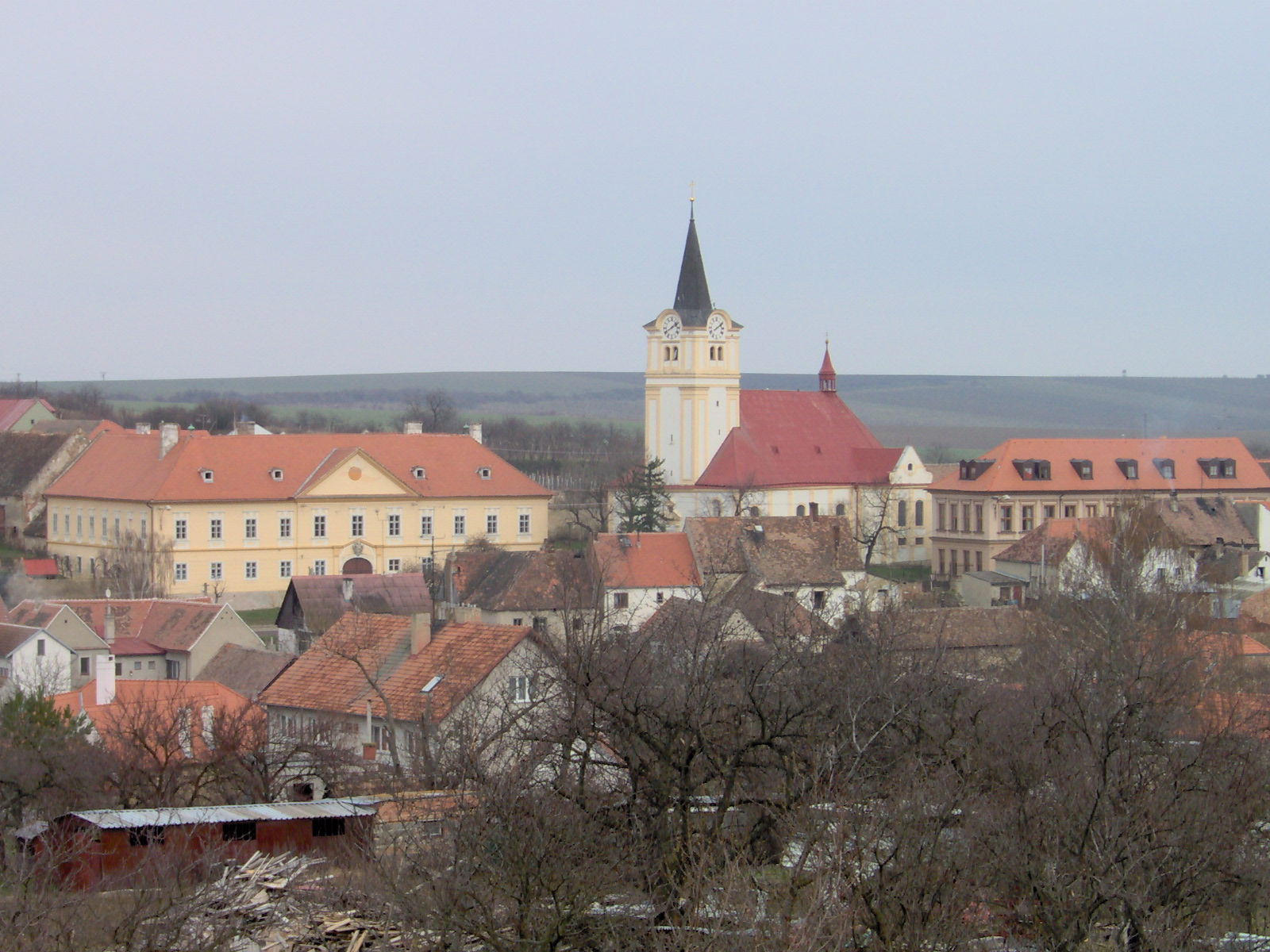
- View from the southwest

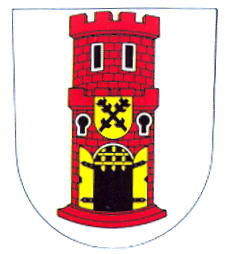
- Coat of arms

- Location in the Czech Republic
- Coordinates: 48°47′36″N 16°0′36″E
- Country: Czech Republic
- Region: South Moravian
- District: Znojmo
- First mentioned: 1201

Area
  - Total: 13.44 km^{2} (5.19 sq mi)
- Elevation: 248 m (814 ft)

Population (2026-01-01)
  - Total: 1,144
  - Density: 85.12/km^{2} (220.5/sq mi)
- Time zone: UTC+1 (CET)
  - Summer (DST): UTC+2 (CEST)
- Postal code: 671 22
- Website: www.obecsatov.cz

Šatov (Czech pronunciation: [ˈʃatof]; German: Schattau) is a market town in Znojmo District in the South Moravian Region of the Czech Republic. It has about 1,100 inhabitants.

== Etymology ==
The name was probably derived from the personal name Šat. According to local legend, the village was named in honour of Queen Svatava (also called Šatava).

== Geography ==
Šatov is located about 7 kilometres (4 mi) south of Znojmo and 60 km (37 mi) southwest of Brno, on the border with Austria. It lies in the Dyje–Svratka Valley. The highest point is at 291 m (955 ft) above sea level. The Daníž Stream flows through the market town.

== History ==
The first written mention of Šatov is from 1201. In 1338, the village became property of the town of Znojmo. In 1497, Šatov was promoted to a market town by King Vladislaus II. In 1600, Šatov was acquired by the Berka of Dubá family and annexed to the Jaroslavice estate.

== Demographics ==
Historical population

Year	Pop.	±%
1869	1,564	—
1880	1,700	+8.7%
1890	1,963	+15.5%
1900	2,494	+27.1%
1910	2,323	−6.9%

Year	Pop.	±%
1921	2,079	−10.5%
1930	2,065	−0.7%
1950	1,302	−36.9%
1961	1,317	+1.2%
1970	1,168	−11.3%

Year	Pop.	±%
1980	1,168	+0.0%
1991	1,138	−2.6%
2001	1,174	+3.2%
2011	1,132	−3.6%
2021	1,082	−4.4%

Source: Censuses

== Economy ==
Šatov is known for viticulture. It lies in the Znojemská wine subregion.

== Transport ==
Šatov is located on the railway line heading from Znojmo to Vienna in Austria. There is the railway border crossing Znojmo / Retz in the municipality.

== Sights ==
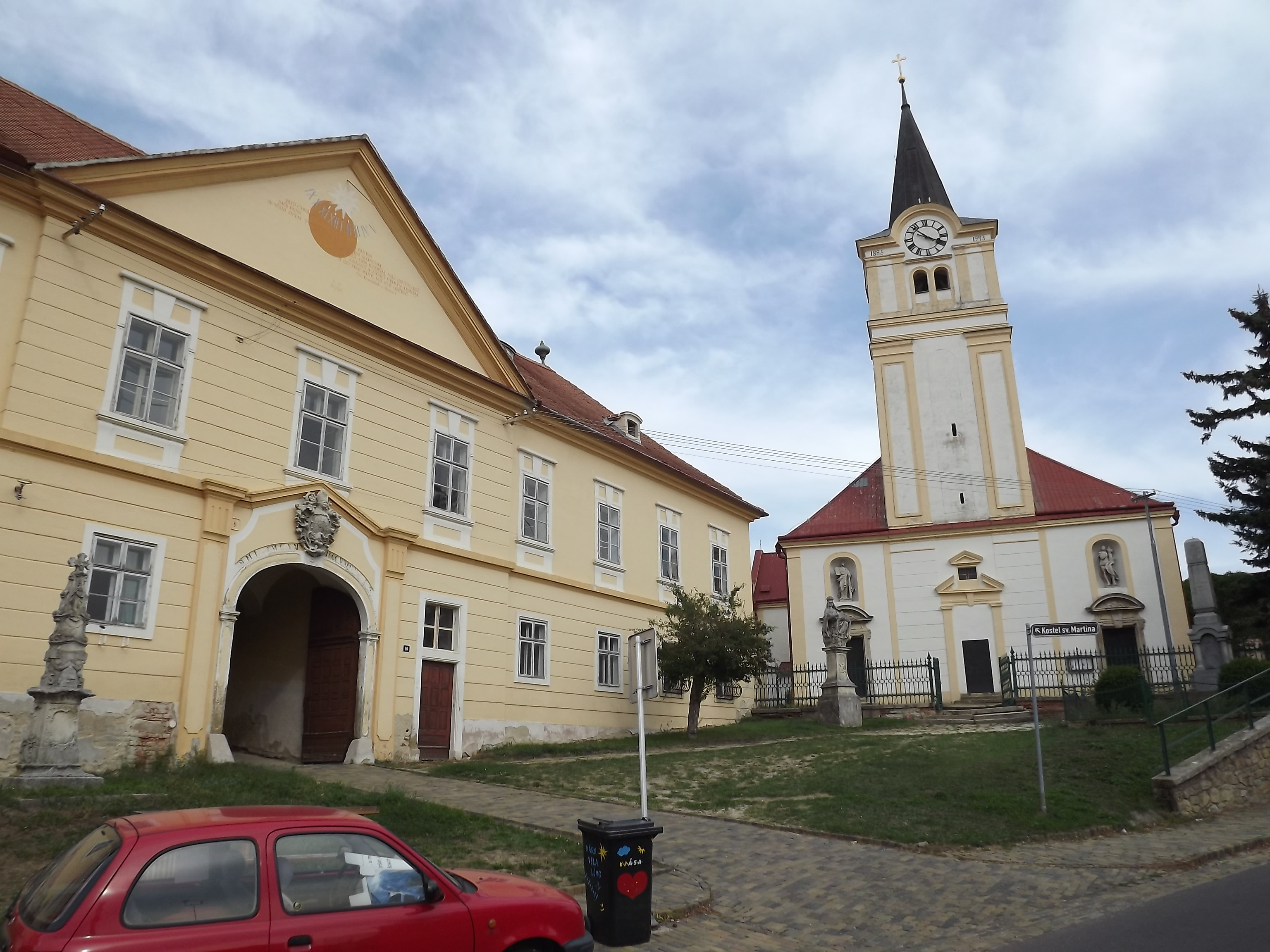
Rectory and Church of Saint Martin

The main landmark of Šatov is the Church of Saint Martin. It has a late Gothic core from the 15th century. In 1656 and twice in the 19th century, it was rebuilt into its present form. Next to the church is the Chapel of the Holy Sepulchre. The chapel with a Gothic core and preserved Romanesque fragment is the oldest building in Šatov.

The historic centre of Šatov is well preserved and is protected as a village monument zone. It is a traditional wine-growing village with preserved sets of elements of folk architecture.

== Notable people ==
- Hellmut Diwald (1924–1993), German historian

== Twin towns – sister cities ==
Šatov is twinned with:

- Semerovo, Slovakia
