= Zeitgeschichtliche Forschungsstelle Ingolstadt =

Historical revisionist association in Bavaria

The Zeitgeschichtliche Forschungsstelle Ingolstadt e. V. (Ingolstadt Research Institute for Contemporary Historical Research registered association, ZFI, also known as Institut für Zeitgeschichtsforschung Ingolstadt) is a historical revisionist association located in Dunsdorf, Bavaria.

== Political orientation ==
The ZFI was founded in 1981 and shaped by Alfred Schickel, Hellmut Diwald and Alfred Seidl, in opposition to the renowned Institut für Zeitgeschichte (Institut für Contemporary History) in Munich. It has about 500 to 600 members. It organizes large meetings twice a year, and publishes the Zeitgeschichtliche Bibliothek and the ZFI-Informationen. Stephen E. Atkins has stated that the ZFI is a Holocaust denial institution in Germany, while the head of the ZFI, Alfred Schickel, was careful to avoid German restrictions against disputing the Holocaust and has concentrated on what Atkins describes as "so-called Allied atrocities against the Germans". For instance, Schickel wrote in 1980 that the number of six millions Jews killed in the Holocaust was "no longer advocated seriously today in contemporary historical science". "The ZFI rejects the findings of historical research, and uses ideologically based pseudohistory. In doing so, it creates a "parallel universe" isolated from scholarly discourse by self-referencing to its own publications." In conferences and meetings, National Socialism is trivialized, and the German guilt for the Second World War is denied. This happens in close collaboration with periodicals such as Europa Vorn, Nation und Europa and Deutschland in Geschichte und Gegenwart, which pursue similar goals. The founders of ZFI, who are now dead, have collaborated with historical revisionist and Radical right organizations. Former GDR policeman Bernd Wagner regarded the ZFI in 1994 as "one of the intellectual centers of far right historical revisionism in Germany".

== Criticism ==
The ZFI was previously observed by the intelligence service of the Bavarian government. However, the ZFI no longer features in the yearly reports of the intelligence service, that depict extremist and anti-constitutional activities. In February 2007, the service stated, though, that "Publications belonging to the far right refer to the Head of the ZFI and his articles in order to propagate thoughts which are not compatible with the free democratic order."

The SPD and others have made allegations that Alfred Lehmann (CSU), Lord Mayor of Ingolstadt, has participated several times in ZFI conferences, while Horst Seehofer (CSU), the minister for food, agriculture and consumer protection, had sent a laudatory greeting to the organization.

Some of the more active critics of the institution include the left-wing journalist Anton Maegerle, who published his portrait of the ZFI in 1996. Its publications are widely considered to be of revisionist nature.

== Award program ==
Die ZFI also awards the Dr. Walter-Eckhardt-Ehrengabe für Zeitgeschichtsforschung ("Dr. Walter Eckhardt Honorary Gift for Contemporary Historical Research"). Among the recipients in the preceding years were:

- Alfred Schickel (1986)
- Joachim Hoffmann (1991)
- Walter Post (1993)
- Franz W. Seidler (1998)
- Alfred-Maurice de Zayas (2001)

== Literature ==
- Andreas Angerstorfer, Annemarie Dengg: Rechte Strukturen in Bayern. Eine Dokumentation mit Schwerpunkt Oberbayern, Oberpfalz und Niederbayern. Second revised edition, Munich 2005
- Anton Maegerle: "Club der Revisionisten". Blick nach Rechts No. 25, 11 December 2006.
- Bernd Wagner: Handbuch Rechtsextremismus - Netzwerke, Parteien, Organisationen, Ideologiezentren, Medien, Reinbek near Hamburg 1994
