= BNR =

BNR may refer to one of the following:

- BNR Nieuwsradio, a Dutch radio station
- Banca Naţională a României (Romanian for "National Bank of Romania")
- Banque nationale du Rwanda (French for "National Bank of Rwanda")
- Belarusian National Republic
- Bell-Northern Research, telecoms R&D company in Canada
- Bengal Nagpur Railway (BNR), now renamed South Eastern Railway, Kolkata, India
- Bergen Nordhordland Rutelag, a Norwegian transport corporation
- Binary number representation, or two's complement, a format for representing signed numbers using binary notation
- Biological nutrient removal, a process for treating wastewater
- Blick nach Rechts, an information service about activities of the extreme right
- "Body Not Recovered", an appellation to those killed in action or to those missing in action during a military operation, with the implication that the subject in question may be deceased
- Breazeale Nuclear Reactor, Pennsylvania State University, United States
- Bulgarian National Radio
- Burlington Northern Railroad
- Backus–Naur form, a notation language in computer science
