= Criticism of technology =

Criticism of technology is an analysis of adverse impacts of industrial and digital technologies. It is argued that, in all advanced industrial societies (not necessarily only capitalist ones), technology becomes a means of domination, control, and exploitation, or more generally something which threatens the survival of humanity. Some of the technology opposed by the most radical critics may include everyday household products, such as refrigerators, computers, and medication. However, criticism of technology comes in many shades.

== Overview ==
Some authors such as Chellis Glendinning and Kirkpatrick Sale consider themselves Neo-Luddites and hold that technological progress has had a negative impact on humanity. Their work focused on seeking meaning out of technological change, specifically wrestling with the question of "how tools and their affordances change and alter the fabric of everyday life." Ellul, for instance, maintained that when people assert that technology is an instrument of freedom or the means to achieve historical destiny or the execution of divine vocation, it results in the glorification and sanctification of Technique so that it becomes that which gives meaning and value to life rather than mere ensemble of materials. This is echoed by rhetorical critics who cite the way technological discourse damages institutions and individuals who make up those institutions due to its idealization and capacity to define social hierarchies.

In its most extreme, criticisms of technology produce analyses of technology as potentially leading to catastrophe. For instance, activist Naomi Klein described how technology is employed by capitalism in its commitment to a "shock doctrine", which promotes a series of crises so that speculative profit can be accumulated. There are theorists who also cite the 2008 financial crisis as well as the Chernobyl and Fukushima disasters to support their critique. Critiques also focus on specific issues such as how technology—through robotics, automation, and software—is destroying people's jobs faster than it is creating them, contributing to the incidence of poverty and inequality.

In the 1970s in the US, the critique of technology became the basis of a new political perspective called anarcho-primitivism, which was forwarded by thinkers such as Fredy Perlman, John Zerzan, and David Watson. They proposed differing theories about how it became an industrial society, and not capitalism as such, that was at the root of contemporary social problems. This theory was developed in the journal Fifth Estate in the 1970s and 1980s, and was influenced by the Frankfurt School, the Situationist International, Jacques Ellul and others.

The critique of technology overlaps with the philosophy of technology but whereas the latter tries to establish itself as an academic discipline the critique of technology is basically a political project, not limited to academia. It features prominently in neo-Marxist (Herbert Marcuse and Andrew Feenberg), ecofeminism (Vandana Shiva) and in post development (Ivan Illich)

== See also ==
- Critical theory
- Deep ecology
- Development criticism
- The Failure of Technology
- Frankfurt School
- History of science and technology
- Luddite
- Medicalization
- Paradigm shift
- Postdevelopment theory
- Science, technology and society
- Social criticism
- Social effect of evolutionary theory
- Technology and society
