= Nietzsche (Jünger book) =

1949 book by Friedrich Georg Jünger

- Author: Friedrich Georg Jünger
- Language: German
- Subject: philosophy of Friedrich Nietzsche
- Publisher: Verlag Vittorio Klostermann
- Publication date: 1949
- Publication place: West Germany
- Pages: 172

Nietzsche is a book about the philosophy of Friedrich Nietzsche by the German writer Friedrich Georg Jünger. It was one of several books by Jünger that Verlag Vittorio Klostermann published in 1949.

== Background ==
Friedrich Georg Jünger's readings of Friedrich Nietzsche during the interwar period, where he combined them with German nationalism, had influenced what became known as the Conservative Revolution. According to Armin Mohler, who established the term Conservative Revolution in the post-war discourse, it was Jünger's interpretation of Nietzsche's conception of eternal return that defined the movement and set it apart from all other movements. When he wrote Nietzsche, Jünger had moved away from nationalism and separated his philosophy from political life, but retained its core elements and adapted them to the practical realities of post-war Germany.

== Summary ==
The book consists of Jünger's interpretation of the philosophy of Friedrich Nietzsche, centred on noble morality and the eternal return. It approaches Nietzsche through his relationship with the poetry of Friedrich Hölderlin and his analysis of modernity. It focuses on the three works by Nietzsche that Jünger considered the most important: The Birth of Tragedy, Thus Spoke Zarathustra and The Will to Power.
