= Jünger-Haus Wilflingen =

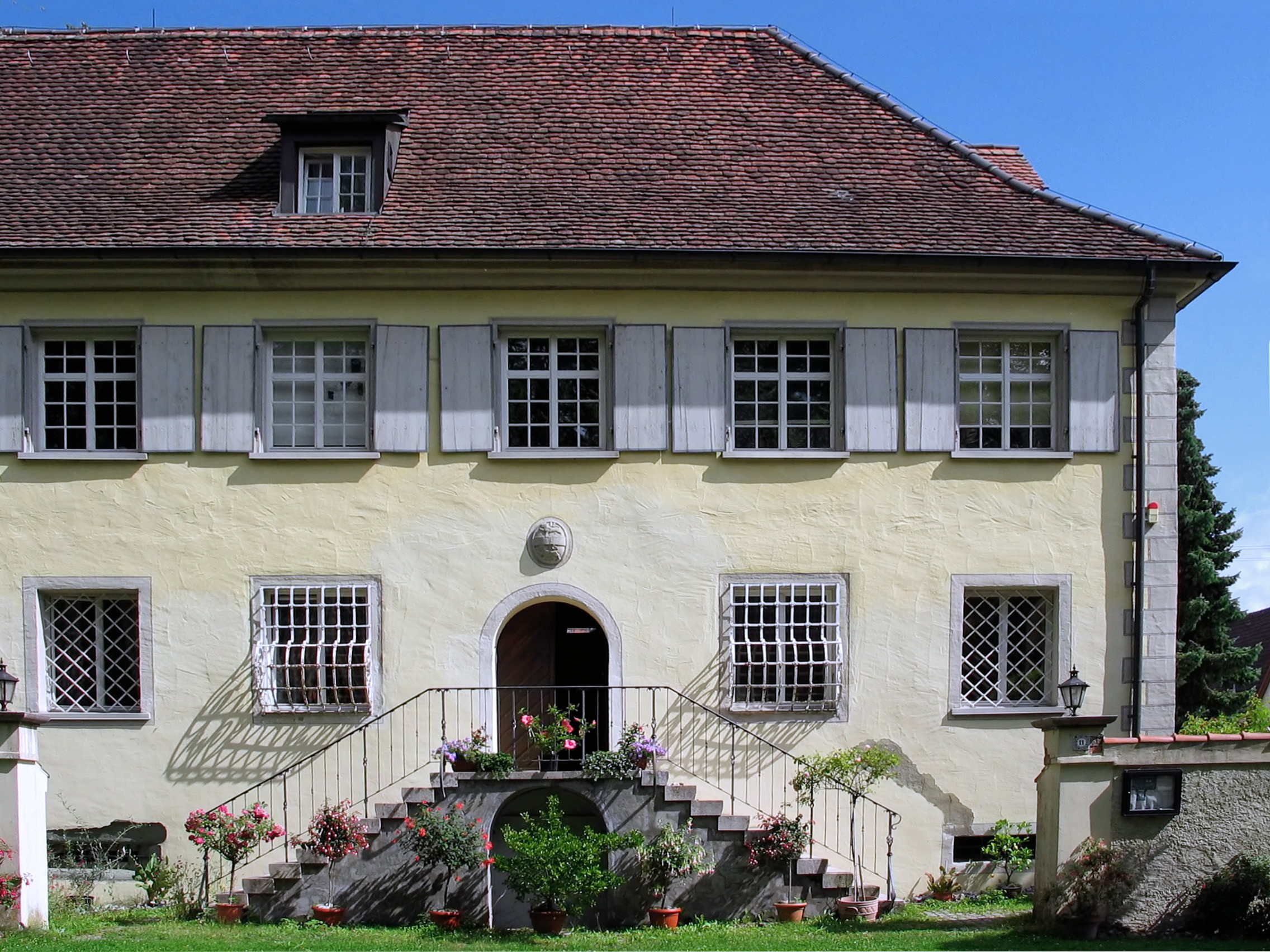
- Location: Germany
- Coordinates: 48°08′15″N 9°21′23″E
- Website: www.juenger-haus.de
- Location of Jünger-Haus Wilflingen

The Jünger-Haus Wilflingen (German for "Jünger's house in Wilflingen", a village near Langenenslingen in Upper Swabia, a region in the German state Baden-Württemberg) was the last home of the German writer Ernst Jünger. After Jünger's death in 1998 it became a memorial place for him. Since its restoration in 2010/2011 it now functions as a museum. During the renovations, the items contained in the house were stored in the Center of Literary Museums in Marbach am Neckar.

== Memorial place and museum ==
The museum has the following sights:

- Living room and office of the writer
- Library
- Collection of beetles
- A room about the works of Jünger's brother, Friedrich Georg Jünger
- A general exhibition

The museum contains about sixty thousand objects and over nine thousand books. The house also contains diverse carpets and souvenirs which Jünger brought from his voyages.
