= Andreas Paul Weber =

German lithographer, draftsman and painter (1893-1980)

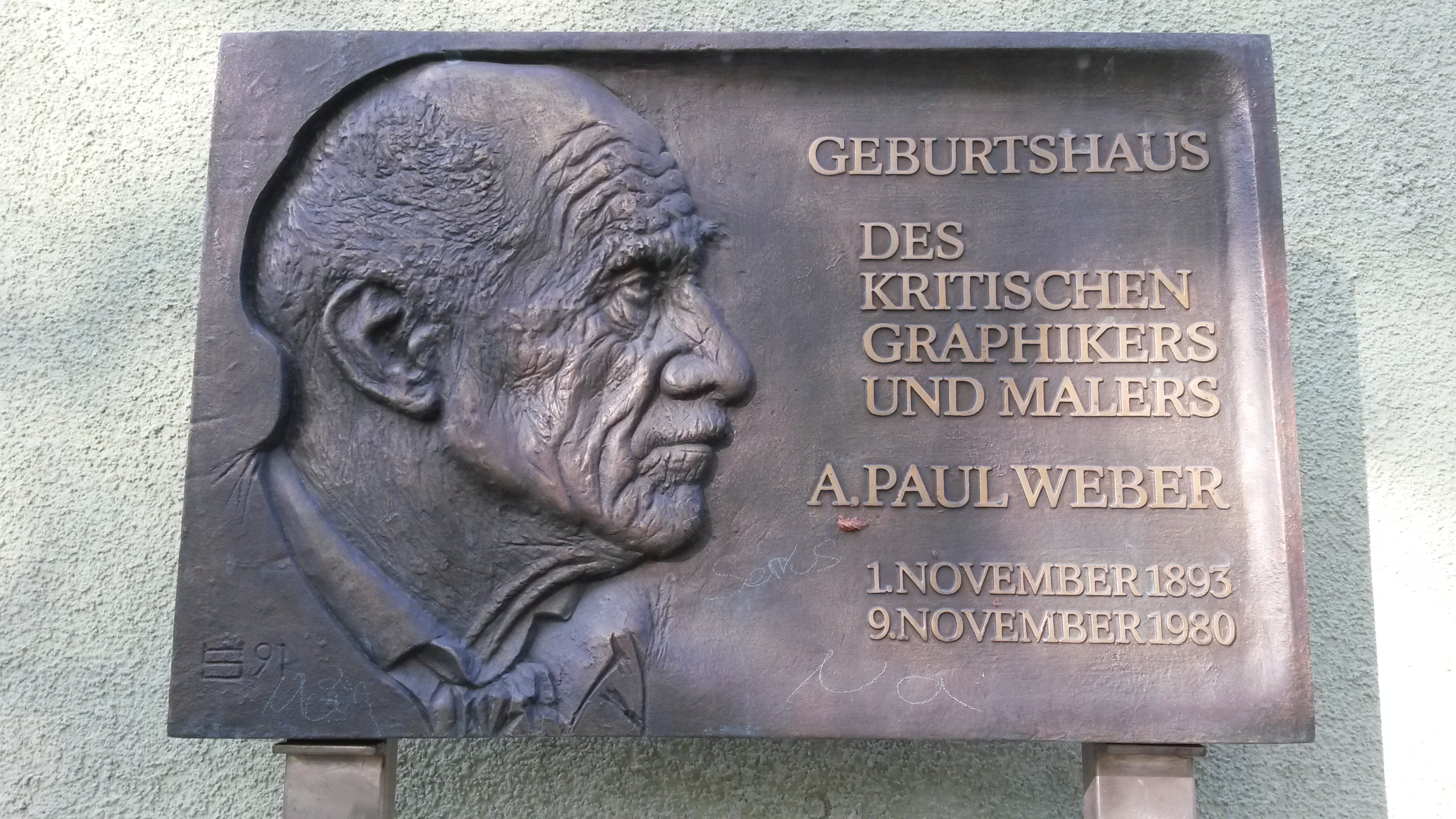
Memorial plaque at the birthplace of A. Paul Weber in Arnstadt, Thuringia

Andreas Paul Weber (1 November 1893 – 9 November 1980) was a German lithographer and painter.

== Early life ==
Weber grew up in Arnstadt, where his father was a rail assistant. Encouraged by his mother and grandfather, he briefly attended the Kunstgewerbeschule Erfurt (School for decorative and applied arts) before joining the Jungwandervogel, a movement of Germans who wanted to start a new lifestyle closer to nature, in 1908.

Weber served in the Jungwandervogel until 1914, when he was drafted in World War I. He was conscripted to fight on the Eastern Front, before working as a caricaturist for an army magazine. He began to come into his own when it came to art and lithography, as he had his work published in such journals as the Magazine for National Revolutionary Politics.

== Family ==
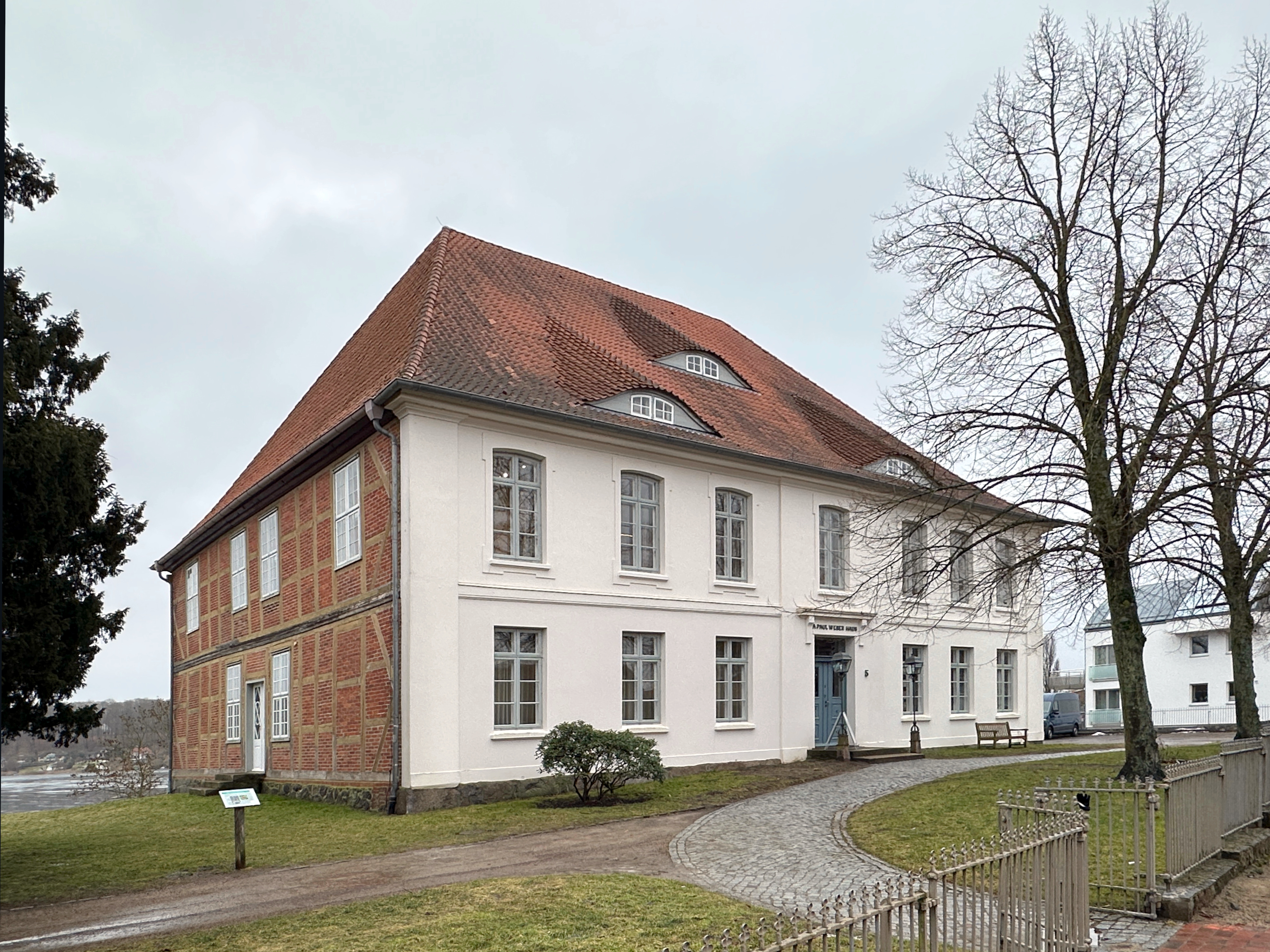
A. Paul Weber Museum in Ratzeburg

In 1920, Weber married Toni Klander, with whom he had five children. He and his son Christian started a design press in 1925, where they produced logos, bookplates and advertising graphics.

== Work ==
Weber left behind an extensive graphic and lithographic body of work. Among other things, he dealt with the topics of Nazism, politics, the environment and medicine. He also designed commercial graphics and a number of book illustrations. Other series of images are The Chess Players, portrait caricatures, satirical / allegorical representations of animals and drawings for the magazine Resistance published by Ernst Niekisch. Journal of National Revolutionary Politics; the best known is probably the lithograph Das Gerücht (The Rumor). The series British Pictures (1941) and Leviathan, was later criticized as war propaganda.

== Ideological background ==
Weber was openly antisemitic, and worked in illustration for many antisemitic publications.

He also became a member of a National Bolshevik group when Adolf Hitler rose to power in Germany. As a result, he was imprisoned by the Nazi Party in 1937 and sent to Fuhlsbüttel concentration camp however was released shortly after.

== Later life ==
Weber's relationship to the Nazi regime was ambivalent. Due to his work with a National Bolshevik resistance movement, headed by Ernst Niekisch, against the regime, he was sent to the Hamburg-Fuhlsbüttel concentration camp on 2 July 1937. He later spent time in regular prisons until December 15. Some of his nationalist and anti-Communist works came in to the liking of the Reich Ministry of Propaganda and published during wartime. During the final months of the war, Weber was enrolled into the Wehrmacht and served on the Eastern Front.

After 1945, Weber lived in Großschretstaken near Mölln. In 1951, the A. Paul Weber Circle was founded in the Hamburg Griffelkunst Association – for which Weber had been working from 1940. From then on he received financial support from the Griffelkunst Association.

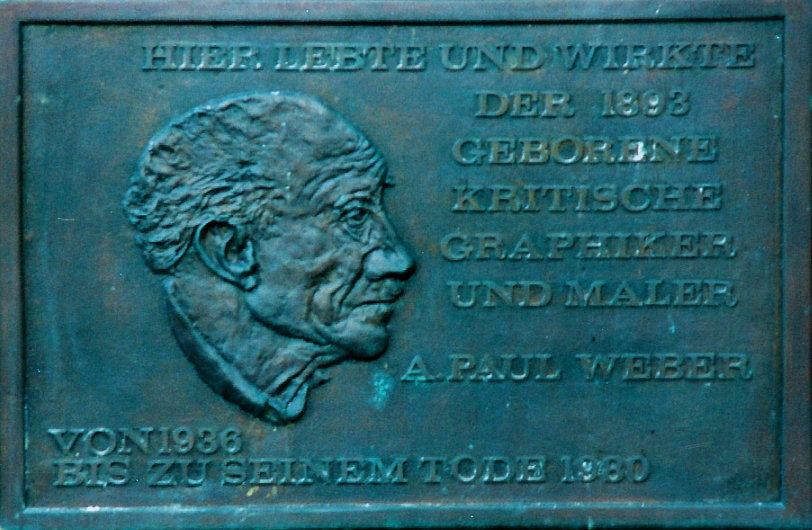
Memorial plaque for Weber on his house in Schretstaken

In 1955 he was awarded the Art Prize of the State of Schleswig-Holstein and in 1963 the Hans Thoma Medal. In 1971 he received an honorary professorship from the state of Schleswig-Holstein "in appreciation of his complete work as a graphic artist. Weber was also awarded the Great Cross of Merit in 1971 by the then Federal President Gustav Heinemann. Heinemann was one of his great admirers and it was also the one who opened the A. Paul Weber Museum on the cathedral peninsula in Ratzeburg in 1973 on the occasion of Weber's 80th birthday.
