= Ernst Krieck =

German professor

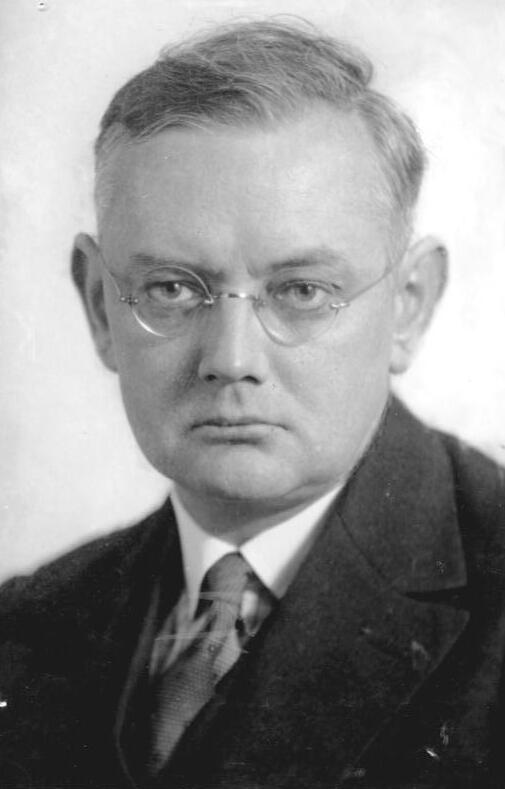
Krieck in 1930

Ernst Krieck (6 July 1882–19 March 1947) was a German teacher, writer, and professor. Along with Alfred Baeumler, Krieck was considered a leading National Socialist theoretical scientist.

== Life ==
=== Before the Third Reich ===
Krieck was born in 1882 in Vögisheim to a working-class family. He was unable to attend high school since he lacked the funds to do so. Therefore, after graduating from middle school, he enrolled in a teacher's college in Karlsruhe because it was his only option for furthering his education. In 1900, he entered the Baden elementary school district; in 1904, he was transferred to a school in Mannheim. During his work as an elementary school teacher, he began to criticize the dominant school system as being mechanical and too bureaucratic.

Persönlichkeit und Kultur (Personality and Culture) was his first literary work, published in 1910. In 1917, Krieck published Die deutsche Staatsidee (The German National Idea). In 1920, Die Revolution der Wissenschaft (The Revolution of Science) was published, followed in 1922 by his most important work Philosophie der Erziehung (The Philosophy of Education), which earned him an honorary doctorate from Heidelberg University.

In 1928, after four years of working as a freelance writer, Krieck was employed at Frankfurt am Main Pedagogical Academy. Until the end of the 1920s, he supported the traditional liberal teaching staff's views, which clashed with the school politics of the Social Democratic Party (SPD), Centre Party, and the Catholic Church. It was in 1931 when he turned to politics and joined the nationalistic anti-Semitic Militant League for German Culture. After declaring "Heil auf Dritte Reich" ("Hail to the Third Reich") at the solstice festival that year, Krieck was transferred to the Dortmund Pedagogical Academy.

During this time, throughout the Ruhr region in Germany, Krieck acted frequently as a political speaker. On 1 January 1932, he became a member of the Nazi Party and the National Socialist Teachers League. The increased aggression from the Nazi Party led to his suspension as a professor in 1932.

=== Third Reich Era ===
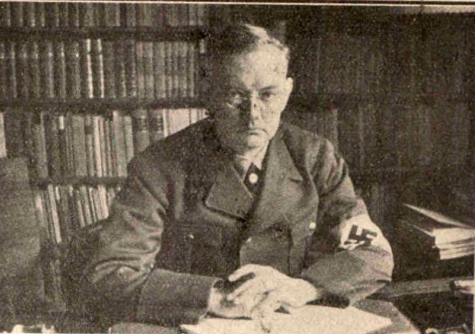
Krieck in 1935

In April 1933, Krieck became the first Nazi president of Goethe University Frankfurt through a secretarial decree after the Nazi takeover. The previous day, despite not having attended secondary school and lacking an Abitur, he was appointed Professor Education and Philosophy.

Krieck's election marked the start of a union "between the Führer (leader) of the town, the guidance of the NSDAP, and the Führer of the University". He announced an aggressive cleanup of the school, saying, “It is our collective goal to make a stronghold for the German spirit in the city of Frankfurt. We are marching toward a new culture, that of National Socialism and its Führer, to make way for the political revolution”. One of the first measures was the public burning of books in Römerberg on 10 May 1933.

Krieck became the publisher of magazine Volk im Werden (People Coming into Being), which was published every two months from 1933 to 1944 and focused on Nazi educational ideas. In 1934, he took the position as chairman of the Philosophy and Education department at Heidelberg University, where he later served as president from April 1937 to October 1938. From 1934, he worked for the Security Service of the Reichsführer-SS as a spy in the science department. In 1935, he became leader of the Gau Nazi Teachers' Union in Baden. In the summer of 1936, he made public and programmatic appearances alongside Bernhard Rust.

His core philosophy caused severe controversy with the National Socialist race theorists in the years 1936–1938, whereupon he left all political and academic offices. In 1938, he left the SS, but was given the honorary role of Obersturmbannführer.

In 1944, he became one of several leaders of the National Socialist Teachers League.

=== After the Third Reich ===
Following the end of World War II, he was dismissed from the university and detained by U.S. occupying forces. He died on 19 March 1947 in an internment camp located in Moosburg an der Isar.

The Heidelberg University Archives has received estate items belonging to Krieck and his daughter, Ilse. This inheritance includes photo albums, single-frame pictures, a bust, correspondence, and five gramophone records featuring Krieck's 1933 speech.

== Works ==
- Heil und Kraft: Ein Buch Germanischer Weltweisheit. Leipzig: Armanen-Verlag, 1943.
- Erlebter Neuidealismus. Heidelberg: Carl Winter's Universitätsbuchhandlung, 1942.
- Natur und Naturwissenschaft. Leipzig: Oswald Schmidt, 1941
- Der Mensch in der Geschichte. Leipzig: Armanen-Verlag, 1940
- England: Ideologie und Wirklichkeit. München: Zentralverlag der NSDAP, 1940.
- Volkscharakter und Sendungsbewußtsein. Politische Ethik des Reichs. Leipzig: Armanen, 1940.
- Weltanschauliche Entscheidung. Leipzig: Österreichischer Landesverlag, 1939.
- Mythologie des bürgerlichen Zeitalters. Leipzig: Armanen-Verlag, 1939.
- Leben als Prinzip der Weltanschauung und Problem der Wissenschaft. Leipzig: Armanen-Verlag, 1938.
- Völkisch-Politische Anthropologie. 3 Bände. Leipzig: Armanen-Verlag, 1936–1938.
- Nationalpolitische Erziehung. 20. Auflage. Leipzig: Armanen-Verlag, 1936.
- Grundriß der Erziehungswissenschaft. Fünf Vorträge. Leipzig: Quelle & Meyer, 1936.
- Wissenschaft, Weltanschauung, Hochschulreform. Leipzig: Armanen-Verlag, 1934.
- Der Staat des Deutschen Menschen. 2. Auflage. Berlin: Junker und Dünnhaupt Verlag, 1933.
- Musische Erziehung. 1933.
- Volk im Werden. Leipzig: Gerhard Stalling, 1932.
- Völkischer Gesamtstaat und nationale Erziehung. Heidelberg: Bündischer Verlag, 1932.
- Erziehungsphilosophie. München, 1930.
- Geschichte der Bildung. München, 1930.
- Staat und Kultur. Frankfurt am Main, 1929.
- Deutsche Kulturpolitik?. Frankfurt am Main, 1928.
- Bildungssysteme der Kulturvölker. Leipzig, 1927.
- Menschenformung: Grundzüge der vergleichenden Erziehungswissenschaft. Leipzig: Quelle & Meyer, 1925.
- Philosophie der Erziehung. Jena: Eugen Diederichs Verlag, 1922.
- Erziehung und Entwicklung. Vorspiele zur autonomen Pädagogik. Karlsruhe, 1921.
- Die Revolution der Wissenschaft. Karlsruhe, 1921.
- Die deutsche Staatsidee. Ihre Geburt aus dem Erziehungs- und Entwicklungsgedanken. Jena, 1917.
- Persönlichkeit und Kultur. Heidelberg: Carl Winter's Universitätsbuchhandlung, 1910.
