= Franz W. Seidler =

German historian

- Born: 2 March 1933 (age 93); Vítkov/Wigstadt, Czechoslovakia
- Citizenship: German
- Education: LMU Munich, University of Cambridge, Sorbonne University, NATO Defence College
- Awards: Federal Cross of Merit (1978); Dr. Walter-Eckhardt-Ehrengabe für Zeitgeschichtsforschung (a historical negationist association)
- Scientific career
- Fields: Modern history, particularly military history and social history
- Workplaces: University of the Bundeswehr Munich (1973–1998)

Franz Wilhelm Seidler (born 2 March 1933) is a German historian, author and expert on German military history. From 1973 to 1998, he was Professor of Modern History at the University of the Bundeswehr Munich. Since retirement, he has published works of revisionist nature with extreme right-wing publishers, such as Pour le Mérite Verlag.

== Career ==
As a child, Seidler came as a refugee to West Germany, following the expulsion of Germans after World War II by the Czechoslovak government from his native Moravian Silesia.

Seidler studied history, German and English at LMU Munich, the University of Cambridge and the Sorbonne University of Paris between 1951 and 1956. He was a civil servant (Studienreferendar and Studienassessor) of the state of Baden-Württemberg from 1956 to 1959. From 1959 to 1963, he was the deputy director of the Bundeswehrfachschule in Cologne, and was subsequently employed by the Federal Ministry of Defence, as an Adviser in the Department of Administration and Law, from 1963 to 1968. He was the Scientific Director of the Heeresoffiziersschule München from 1968 to 1972, and attended the NATO Defence College Senior Course in Rome in 1972.

From 1973 until his retirement in 1998, he was Professor of Modern History, particularly social and military history, at the University of the Bundeswehr Munich. He has been active as an expert adviser for the CDU/CSU faction in the Bundestag in the 1990s.

Since his retirement Seidler has published books with the extreme right-wing publisher Pour le Mérite Verlag of Dietmar Munier. A reviewer in the conservative Frankfurter Allgemeine Zeitung, writing about Seidler's book Phantom der Berge, stated: "Since his retirement he publishes one book after the other, with which he has distanced himself from serious historical research." Seidler's biography of Fritz Todt has been described as offering too positive a picture of Todt and as reflecting a neo-conservative perspective.

== Honours ==
- Federal Cross of Merit, 1978
- Sudeten German Culture Prize, 2004
- Dr. Walter-Eckhardt-Ehrengabe für Zeitgeschichtsforschung (a historical negationist association)

== Publications ==
- Kriegsverbrechen in Europa und im Nahen Osten im 20. Jahrhundert, with Alfred-Maurice de Zayas. Mittler & Sohn, 2002. ISBN 3-8132-0702-1 and ISBN 978-3-8132-0702-6
- Die Wehrmacht im Partisanenkrieg – Militärische und völkerrechtliche Darlegungen zur Kriegsführung im Osten, Selent: Pour le Mérite Verlag, 1999, ISBN 3-932381-04-1
- Verbrechen an der Wehrmacht, Selent: Pour le Mérite Verlag, 1998 und 2000, 2 Bände, ISBN 3-932381-03-3 and ISBN 3-932381-05-X
- Avantgarde für Europa. Ausländische Freiwillige in Wehrmacht und Waffen-SS [Avantgarde for Europe: Foreign volunteers in Wehrmacht and Waffen-SS]. Pour le Mérite Verlag, Selent 2004, ISBN 3-932381-26-2.
- Die Militärgerichtsbarkeit der deutschen Wehrmacht 1939–1945, München: Herbig-Verlag 1991. TB 1999: ISBN 978-3-926584-60-1
- Fritz Todt: Baumeister des Dritten Reiches, Herbig, 1986, ISBN 3776614463
- Prostitution, Homosexualität, Selbstverstümmelung. Probleme der deutschen Sanitätsführung 1939–1945. Vowinckel-Verlag, Neckargemünd 1977, ISBN 3-87879-122-4
- "Vergewaltigung des Rechts" ("Rape of Justice"), in: Deutsche Militärzeitschrift, 8 December 2010.
