= Friedrich Georg Jünger =

German lawyer and author

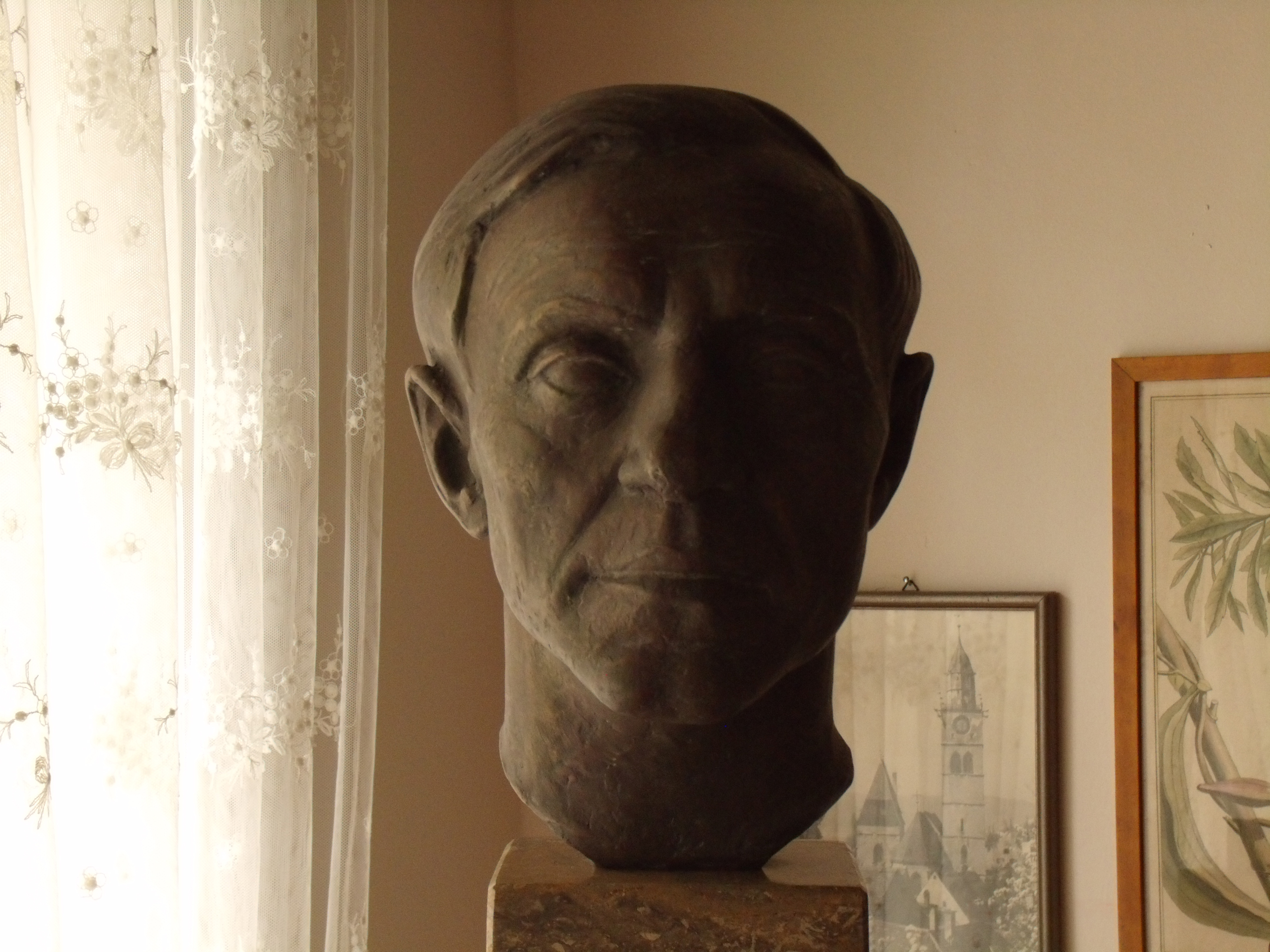
- Sculpture at the Jünger-Haus Wilflingen
- Born: 1 September 1898; Hanover, German Empire
- Died: 20 July 1977 (aged 78); Überlingen, West Germany
- Spouse: Citta Weickhardt (m. 1939)
- Relatives: Ernst Jünger (brother)
- Writing career
- Genres: Poetry, essays, novels
- Subject: Technology

Friedrich "Fritz" Georg Jünger (1 September 1898 – 20 July 1977) was a German writer and lawyer. He wrote poetry, cultural criticism and novels. He was the younger brother of Ernst Jünger.

== Life and work ==
The younger brother of Ernst Jünger, he volunteered for military service in 1916 and was seriously wounded in the Battle of Langemarck. After the First World War he studied law and cameralism at the universities of Leipzig and Halle-Wittenberg. After moving to Berlin, he and his brother became involved with the National Bolshevik magazine Widerstand and the people around it such as Friedrich Hielscher and Ernst Niekisch. In 1926, he published a national revolutionary manifesto, Der Aufmarsch des Nationalismus, where he praised the virility of an envisioned revolutionary state in the following terms: "Let thousands, nay millions, die; what meaning have these rivers of blood in comparison with a state, into which flow all the disquiet and longing of the German being!"

His stance against National Socialism is explicit in the poem "Der Mohn", published in the collection Gedichte (1934), and he was interrogated by the Gestapo because of it. He was interrogated again in 1937 when Niekisch was arrested. The same year he left Berlin to live with Ernst in Überlingen, and two years later the brothers moved to Kirchhorst near Hanover. Here he wrote The Failure of Technology, a study of mechanization with lines of reasoning that later would become associated with the ecological movement. After getting married, he moved back to Überlingen and settled in what had been his parents' house. From there he wrote about Greek mythology and began to work on a translation of the Odyssey, eventually published in 1981.

Jünger's post-war works include poetry, novels, essays and short stories. These include the monograph Nietzsche (1949) and the novel Heinrich March (1979), which traces the experiences of his generation. Important early influences on his thinking and writing had included Jean Paul, Christian Dietrich Grabbe, Georg Trakl, David Hume and Oswald Spengler. Other influences included the poetry of ancient Greece, Icelandic sagas, the poetry of Friedrich Hölderlin, Eduard Mörike, Joseph Freiherr von Eichendorff and Charles Baudelaire, his brother Ernst, Martin Heidegger, Paul Yorck von Wartenburg and Rudolf Kassner.

== Selected works ==
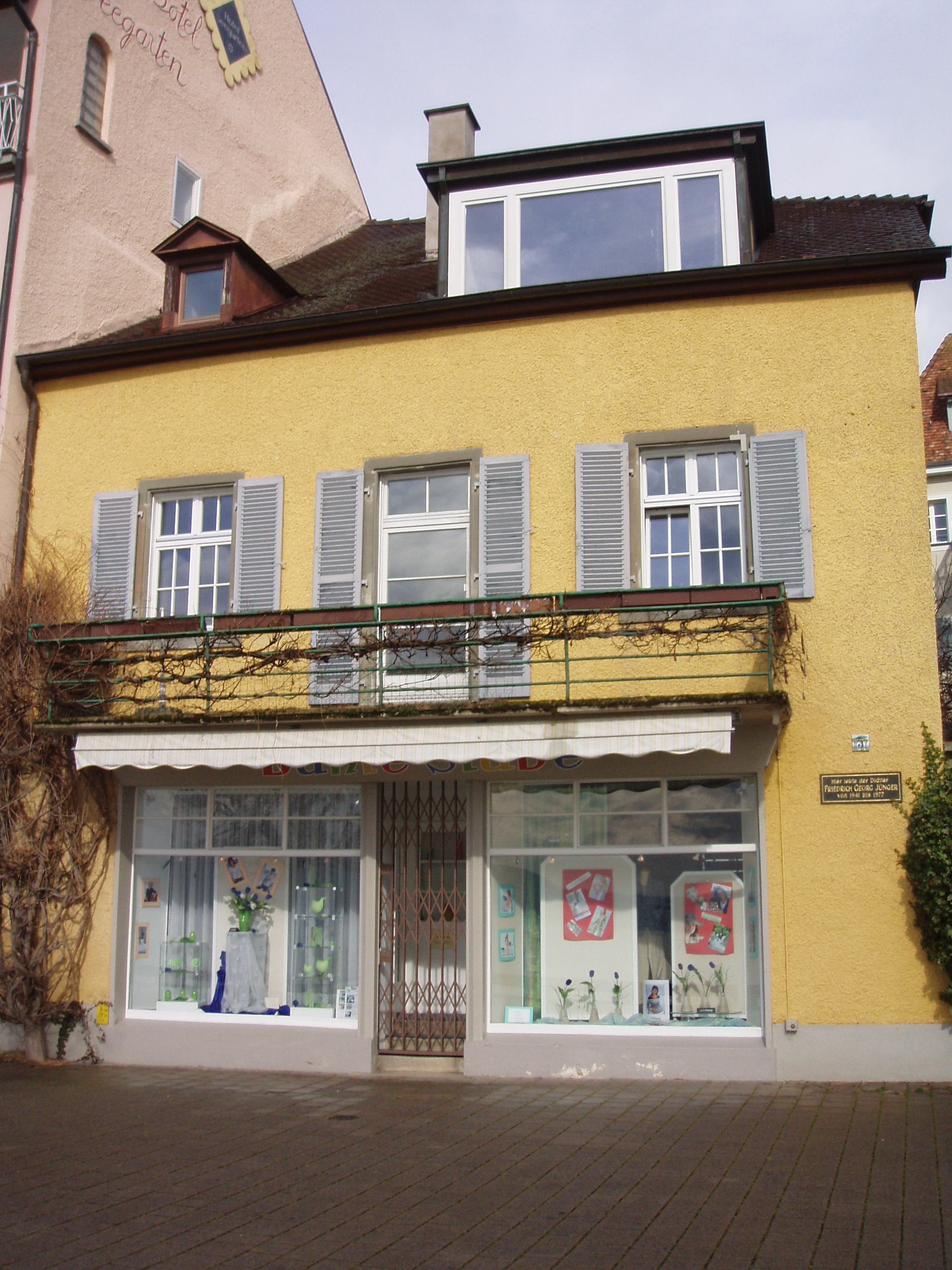
Jünger's house in Überlingen

- Der Aufmarsch des Nationalismus (1926)
- Gedichte (1934) – poetry
- Der verkleidete Theseus (1934) – play
- Der Taurus (1937) – poetry
- Der Missouri (1940) – poetry
- Griechische Götter (1943) – essay
- Die Titanen (1944) – essay
- Die Perfektion der Technik (1946) – essay
  - English translation: The Failure of Technology: Perfection Without Purpose, H. Regnery, Hinsdale, Ill., 1949
- Maschine und Eigentum (1949) – essay
- Nietzsche (1949) – essay
- Grüne Zweige (1951) – autobiography
- Iris im Wind (1952) – poetry
- Die Spiele (1953) – essay
- Der erste Gang (1954) – novel
- Ring der Jahre (1954) – poetry
- Erinnerung an die Eltern (1955) – autobiography
- Schwarzer Fluß und windweißer Wald (1955) – poetry
- Zwei Schwestern (1956) – novel
- Gedächtnis und Erinnerung (1957) – essay
- Sprache und Denken (1962) – essay
- Heinrich March (1979) – novel
- Homers Odyssee (1981) – translation
