= Blick nach Rechts =

The Blick nach Rechts (BNR, View to the Right) is a social democratic German-language information service which appears every two weeks on the Internet. Its concern is the current "information about far-right activities" (subtitle: "Aufklärung über rechtsextreme Aktivitäten"), which in the opinion of the initiators aren't noticed enough by the German media.

== Structure and purchase ==
Between 1984 and 2004, the journal appeared as a printed issue, and since then appears as an online-magazine every two weeks, thus with up to 26 issues per year. For one-year subscribers, these are also available as e-papers.

The articles of the most recent online-issue are usually available for free. They will be archived with the appearance of the subsequent issue.

The front page of the BNR offers a sitemap linking to subpages. it is divided into four main sections:

- "BNR aktuell" for current news, events, and activities
- an archive with issues extending back to 1996. The archive and the internal search function are free for users who are registered with their name and e-mail address, and who have purchased a one-year subscription.
- an "Interaktiv" page, where subscribers can read and write letters to the editor, announce projects against right-wing extremism, and invite friends to become readers of the BNR
- an "Aktiv" page with a steadily updated calendar of activities, a list of initiatives, and gamesagainst right-wing extremism

Subsections which are attainable immediately include:

- "brandaktuell" ("urgent news") with links to daily news relevant to the field
- "Meinungen" ("opinions") with letters to the editor and comments on such events
- "Hintergrund" ("Background") with background information about these
- a summary of the recent issue
- a rubric "Abo" ("subscription")

An internal search function allows one to research every article of the archive and the recent issue via keyword, ordered by relevance. For security reasons, the result of the search will be deleted immediately upon opening a page.

There is no public page for letters to the editor. The BNR editorial staff decides which of the signed letters they print.

== Controversy ==
On 28 September 2004 the CDU/CSU parliamentary group initiated a federal inquiry into the support of the BNR with tax money. The inquiry criticised the "large number of links" ("die Vielzahl der Links") from the homepage to "obviously extremely left movements, which are also mentioned in the reports of the Federal Office for the Protection of the Constitution" („offenkundig linksextremistische Bewegungen, die auch in Verfassungsschutzberichten erwähnt werden"). Together with ten local Antifa groups and alliances, it was listing the Vereinigung der Verfolgten des Naziregimes – Bund der Antifaschistinnen und Antifaschisten (Union of persecuted of the Nazi regime - Alliance of the Antifaschists) and two internet sites. For some of these groups, the inquiry refers to opinions of the Federal offices and State offices (Landesbehörden) for the Protection of the Constitution. This substantiated the suspicion of the inquirers "that the ‘View to the Right’ is a platform for the distribution of far left slogans under the cover of the struggle against the far right" ("dass der 'Blick nach Rechts' eine mit Steuergeldern finanzierte Plattform auch für die Verbreitung linksextremistischer Parolen unter dem Etikett der Bekämpfung des Rechtsextremismus ist").

At the time of the inquiry, the BNR homepage contained a statement that it doesn't agree with the content of other internet sites. The objected links had already been deleted.

According to the answer of the federal government to the small inquiry, in the year 2000 the BNR was funded with collectively 56,497.75 Deutsche Mark by the Ministry of the Interior. The question of ownership did not play a role. The "concern of the ‘bnr’ to inform about current developments and the background of the extreme right-wing scene" ("Anliegen des ‚bnr’, über aktuelle Entwicklungen und Hintergründe der rechtsextremistischen Szene zu informieren und aufzuklären") is "worth to be supported" ("unterstützenswert"). The Federal Government further explained: "The imprint of the ‘bnr’ states the ‘bnr’ does not agree with content from web-sites of third parties to which links from its pages are directed. Additionally, the ‘bnr’ asks their users to announce fallacious, illegal or changed content on such pages of third parties." ("Dem Impressum des ‚bnr’ ist zu entnehmen, dass sich der ‚bnr’ Inhalte von Internetseiten dritter Anbieter, auf die von seinen Seiten aus verlinkt wird, nicht zueigen macht. Zusätzlich fordert der ‚bnr’ seine Nutzer auf, ihn auf fehlerhafte oder rechtswidrige bzw. veränderte Inhalte solcher Internetseiten Dritter hinzuweisen.")

== Editors and authors ==
The current editor is the journalist Helmut Lölhöffel of the Institut für Information und Dokumentation e.V. (Institute for Information and Documentation registered association), the publisher is the Berliner Vorwärts Verlagsgesellschaft mbH, the patron is Ute Vogt, former Minister of State and former chair member of the Social Democratic Party of Germany.

The BNR has no steady list of authors. Several politologists, journalists and experts of the field contribute as free lancers. In 2007, among them were:

- Robert Andreasch
- Horst Freires
- Gudrun Giese
- Michael Klarmann
- Viktor Licht
- Heiner Lichtenstein
- Eberhard Löblich
- Anton Maegerle
- Theo Meier-Ewert
- Thomas Niehoff
- Peter Nowak
- Armin Pfahl-Traughber
- Thomas Pfeiffer
- Andrea Röpke
- Tomas Sager
- Bernhard Schmid
- Andreas Speit
- Volker Stahl

and others.

== See also ==
- Der Rechte Rand
- Dokumentationsarchiv des österreichischen Widerstandes
- Informationsdienst gegen Rechtsextremismus
- Nizkor Project
- redok
