= Alfred Mechtersheimer =

German politician (1939–2018)

Alfred Mechtersheimer (13 August 1939 – 22 December 2018) was a German politician who was a Bundestag member and an author of the "Neue Rechte" (New Right). A former German Air Force colonel and a spokesperson for the far-right "Deutschland-Bewegung" (Movement for Germany), Mechtersheimer was known for his protest against Germany's participation in NATO.

Mechtersheimer was a leading figure in the peace movement in the late 1970s and early 1980s, and one of the founders of the ecopax movement. Consequently, Mechtersheimer's political career saw him move from Bavarian CSU to the Greens in the 1980s. Later he distanced himself from the Greens as well, for their, he thought, lack of patriotism. Afterwards Mechtersheimer organized various movements known for their "stridently nationalist brand of national pacifism". He called his politics since the 1990s "Nationalpazifismus" (literary 'National- pacifism').

Mechtersheimer died on 22 December 2018, at the age of 79.
