= Semerovo =

Village and municipality in Slovakia

Semerovo Komáromszemere
- Municipality
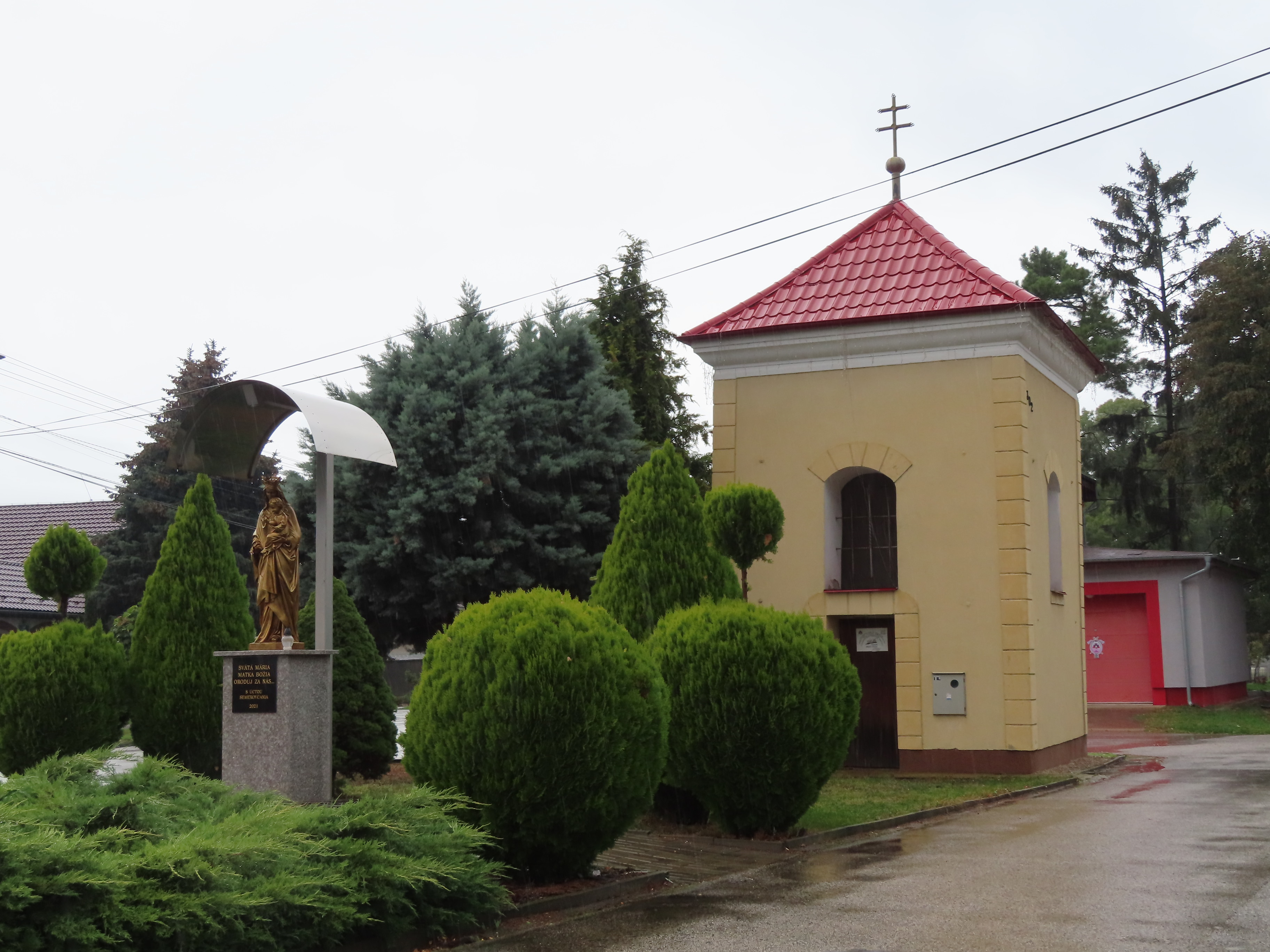

- Flag

- Location of Semerovo in the Nitra Region Location of Semerovo in Slovakia
- Coordinates: 48.02°N 18.35°E
- Country: Slovakia
- Region: Nitra Region
- District: Nové Zámky District
- First mentioned: 1210

Area
  - Total: 23.40 km^{2} (9.03 sq mi)
- Elevation: 152 m (499 ft)

Population (2025)
  - Total: 1,297
- Time zone: UTC+1 (CET)
  - Summer (DST): UTC+2 (CEST)
- Postal code: 941 32
- Area code: +421 35
- Vehicle registration plate (until 2022): NZ
- Website: semerovo.sk

Semerovo (Hungarian: Komáromszemere) is a village and municipality in the Nové Zámky District in the Nitra Region of south-west Slovakia.

== History ==
In historical records the village was first mentioned in 1210.

== Geography ==
The municipality lies at an altitude of 152 metres (499 ft) and covers an area of 23.40 km^{2} (9.03 sq mi) (2025).

== Population ==
Population statistic (10 years)
Year	1995	2005	2015	2025
Count	1249	1384	1411	1297
Difference		+10.80%	+1.95%	−8.07%

Population statistic
Year	2024	2025
Count	1309	1297
Difference		−0.91%

It has a population of 1297 people (31 December 2025).

=== Ethnicity ===
Census 2021 (1+ %)
Ethnicity	Number	Fraction
Slovak	1226	92.04%
Not found out	50	3.75%
Hungarian	42	3.15%
Romani	21	1.57%
Total	1332	

In year 2021 was 1332 people by ethnicity 1226 as Slovak, 50 as Not found out, 42 as Hungarian, 21 as Romani, 8 as Czech, 3 as Ukrainian, 3 as Other, 2 as Italian, 2 as Serbian, 2 as Austrian, 1 as Vietnamese, 1 as Polish and 1 as German.

Note on population: The difference values of population numbers in the table "Population statistic" and in the sections "Ethnicity" & "Religion" is caused by the use of various statistical methods.

There was once a sizable Jewish population consisting of several families; all of them were deported to concentration camps during the years of World War II. There is a small Jewish cemetery on the village's outskirts.

=== Religion ===
Census 2021 (1+ %)
Religion	Number	Fraction
Roman Catholic Church	843	63.29%
None	385	28.9%
Not found out	48	3.6%
Evangelical Church	15	1.13%
Total	1332	

In year 2021 was 1332 people by religion 843 from Roman Catholic Church, 385 from None, 48 from Not found out, 15 from Evangelical Church, 13 from Christian Congregations in Slovakia, 7 from Greek Catholic Church, 5 from Eastern Orthodox Church, 4 from Jehovah's Witnesses, 3 from Other, 2 from Jewish community, 2 from Ad hoc movements, 1 from Old Catholic Church, 1 from United Methodist Church, 1 from Buddhism, 1 from Baptists Church and 1 from Apostolic Church.

== Facilities ==
The village has a small public library a gym and a football pitch, and a Roman Catholic church whose base stone dates from the 9th century.
