= Hellmut Diwald =

German historian and Professor

- Born: 13 August 1924; Šatov (Schattau), Czechoslovakia
- Died: 26 May 1993 (aged 68); Würzburg, Germany
- Citizenship: Czechoslovak; German
- Education: University of Erlangen-Nuremberg, University of Hamburg
- Scientific career
- Fields: Medieval and modern history
- Workplaces: University of Erlangen-Nuremberg (1965–1985)

Hellmut Diwald (13 August 1924 – 26 May 1993) was a German historian and Professor of Medieval and Modern History at the University of Erlangen-Nuremberg from 1965 to 1985.

He was originally from southern Moravia, the son of an Austrian engineer and a Czech mother, and went to school in Prague before the family relocated to Nuremberg in Bavaria in 1938. During World War II, he served in the Wehrmacht. After the war, he went on to study mechanical engineering in Nuremberg before he studied philosophy, German and history at the universities of Hamburg and Erlangen. He earned a doctorate in history in 1953 and completed his Habilitation in 1958. In 1965, he was appointed as Professor of Medieval and Modern History at the University of Erlangen-Nuremberg, where he taught until his retirement in 1985. He was editor of Zeitschrift für Religions- und Geistesgeschichte, a scientific journal, from 1948 to 1966.

Diwald earned much recognition for his books on the philosopher Wilhelm Dilthey (1963) and his publication of the works of Ernst Ludwig von Gerlach (1970), as well as for his biography of Albrecht von Wallenstein (1969) and his book on European history from 1400 to 1555. He also regularly appeared on the ZDF TV show Fragen zur Zeit and was a regular contributor of articles to the newspaper Die Welt. He is also known for a widely discussed book on German history from 1978. He published his opus magnum, Die Großen Ereignisse. Fünf Jahrtausende Weltgeschichte in Darstellungen und Dokumenten, a history of humankind during the last 5000 years in six volumes, in 1990. In 1981, he had co-founded the Zeitgeschichtliche Forschungsstelle Ingolstadt.

Hellmut Diwald was married for thirty years to Susanne Diwald (1922-1989), a scholar of Islamic studies who also taught at the University of Erlangen.

== Works ==
- Das historische Erkennen: Untersuchungen zum Geschichtsrealismus im 19. Jahrhundert. Dissertation. Erlangen 1952; pub. Brill, Leiden 1955
- Der Hegelianismus in Preussen von Heinrich Leo. Hrsg. Leiden-Köln, 1958
- Lebendiger Geist. Hrsg., Leiden-Köln, 1959
- Leopold von Ranke, Geschichte Wallensteins. Hrsg., Düsseldorf, 1967
- Wilhelm Dilthey, Erkenntnistheorie und Philosophie der Geschichte. Goettingen, 1963
- Wallenstein. Eine Biographie. Muenchen-Esslingen, 1969, ISBN 3-7628-0432-X
- Die Freiheit des Glaubens, Freiheit und Toleranz in der abendländischen Geschichte. Hannover, 1967
- Ernst Moritz Arndt. Das Entstehen des deutschen Nationalbewußtseins. München, 1970
- Ernst Ludwig von Gerlach, Von der Revolution zum Norddeutschen Bund. Hrsg., Goettingen, 1970
- Die Anerkennung. Bericht zur Klage der Nation. München-Esslingen, 1970
- Friedrich Schiller, Wallenstein. Frankfurt/M – Berlin – Wien, 1970
- Menschen und Mächte – Geschichte im Blickpunkt. Buchreihe mit 8 Bänden, Hrsg., München, 1973
- Anspruch auf Mündigkeit, Propyläen Geschichte Europas Band 1, 1400–1555. Frankfurt/M – Berlin – Wien, 1975, ISBN 3-549-05481-5
- Geschichte der Deutschen. Propyläen. Frankfurt/M – Berlin – Wien, 1978, ISBN 3-549-05801-2
- Der Kampf um die Weltmeere. München/Zürich, 1980
- Im Zeichen des Adlers, Porträts berühmter Preußen. Hrsg., Bergisch Gladbach, 1981
- Luther. Eine Biographie. Bergisch Gladbach, 1982, ISBN 3-404-61096-2
- Lebensbilder Martin Luthers, ed. with pictures by Karl-Heinz Jürgens. Bergisch Gladbach, 1982
- Dokumente Deutschen Daseins. Hrsg., Krefeld, 1983
- Mut zur Geschichte. 1983, ISBN 3-8334-4593-9
- Die Erben Poseidons. Seemachtpolitik im 20. Jahrh. München, 1984
- Inferiorität als Staatsräson., Hrsg., Krefeld, 1985
- Heinrich der Erste. Die Gründung des Deutschen Reichs. Bergisch Gladbach, 1987
- Der Fall Rose. Ein Nürnberger Urteil wird widerlegt. Einleitung. Mut-Verlag, Asendorf 1988, ISBN 3-89182-033-X
- Geschichte macht Mut. Erlangen, 1989
- Deutschland Einig Vaterland. Geschichte unserer Gegenwart. Ullstein. Frankfurt/M – Berlin, 1990, ISBN 3-8334-5463-6
- Die Großen Ereignisse. Fünf Jahrtausende Weltgeschichte. 6 Bände, Coron, Lachen am Zürichsee, 1990
- Ein Querkopf braucht kein Alibi: Szenen der Geschichte. Frankfurt/M – Berlin, 1991, ISBN 3-8334-5464-4
- Warum so bedrückt? Deutschland hat Zukunft. Hrsg., Hohenrain-Verlag, Tübingen 1992, ISBN 3-89180-034-7.
- Unsere gestohlene Geschichte. Deutsche Akademie für Bildung und Kultur, München 1992
- Handbuch zur Deutschen Nation, Band 4, Deutschlands Einigung und Europas Zukunft. Hrsg., Tübingen, 1992

== Honours ==
- 1979 Kulturpreis für Wissenschaft der Sudetendeutschen Landsmannschaft
- 1980 Südmährischer Kulturpreis
- 1980 Johannes Mathesius – Medaille
- 1983 Kant-Plakette der Deutschen Akademie für Bildung und Kultur
- 1988 Goldener Ehrenring „Der deutschen Literatur“ des Deutschen Kulturwerkes Europäischen Geistes
- 1990 Bismarck-Medaille in Gold
- 1992 Schiller-Preis des Deutschen Kulturwerks Europäischen Geistes (DKEG)
