= Widerstand (magazine) =

German monthly national-revolutionary magazine

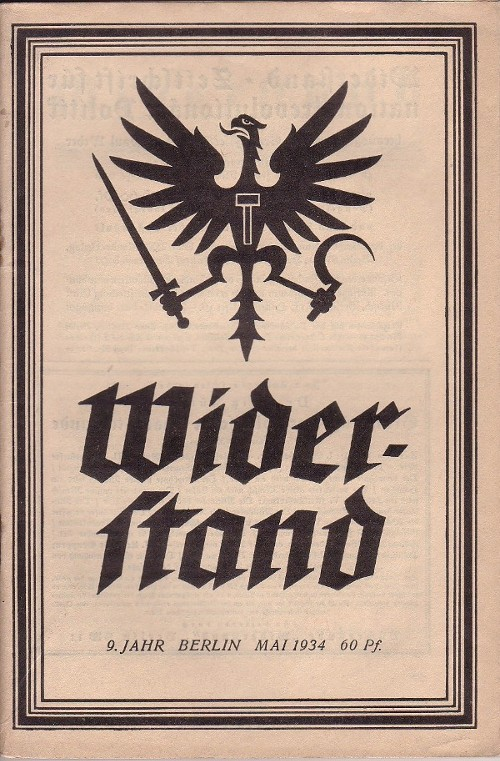

Widerstand. Zeitschrift für nationalrevolutionäre Politik (German: Resistance. Magazine for national-revolutionary politics) was a monthly magazine established in Germany in 1926 to advocate national-revolutionary idea. It was published in Berlin, under the editorship of Ernst Niekisch. Prominent contributors included Ernst Jünger, Friedrich Georg Jünger, A. Paul Weber, August Winnig, and Joseph E. Drexel. The newspaper was shut down in December 1934. After a time in the underground, Niekisch was arrested and held in Nazi prisons from 1937 to 1945.

== Bibliography ==
- Ernst Niekisch (Hrsg.): Schriften des „Widerstand“. Widerstands-Verlag Anna Niekisch, Dresden [Struvestr. 7 III]
- Helmuth von Moltke: Die westliche Grenzfrage. Mit einer Einleitung von Ernst Niekisch und dem Signet des Widerstandsverlages von A. Paul Weber. Widerstands-Verlag Anna Niekisch, Dresden 1929, XV, 58 S. (Schriften des „Widerstand“, Hrsg. Ernst Niekisch, Band 1)
- Ernst Niekisch: Politik und Idee [Erweiterung eines Vortrages]. Buchausstattung von A. Paul Weber. Widerstands-Verlag Anna Niekisch, Dresden 1929, 74 S. (Schriften des „Widerstand“, Hrsg. Ernst Niekisch; Band 2)
- Ernst Niekisch (Hrsg.): Widerstand. Blätter für sozialistische und nationalrevolutionäre Politik. Widerstands-Verlag
- Ernst Niekisch: Widerstand [ausgewählte Aufsätze aus „Widerstand – Blätter für sozialistische und nationalrevolutionäre Politik“]. Mit Zeichnungen von A. Paul Weber. [Hrsg. und eingeleitet von Uwe Sauermann. Hrsg. in Zusammenarbeit mit dem Verein zur Förderung Kultur- und Sozialwissenschaftlicher Publizistik und Bildung e.V.]. Sinus-Verlag, Krefeld 1982, ISBN 3-88289-203-X, 212 S. (Edition d; Band 3)
- Ernst Niekisch und A. Paul Weber (Hrsg.): Widerstand. Zeitschrift für nationalrevolutionäre Politik. Widerstands-Verlag, Berlin (Der 9. Jahrgang 1934 erschien noch, dann Verbot im Dezember 1934)
- Ernst Niekisch (Hrsg.): Entscheidung. Die Wochenzeitung für nationalrevolutionäre Politik. Widerstands-Verlag, Berlin (Erscheinungsverlauf: Nr. 1: 9. Oktober 1932 bis Nr. 11: 26. März 1933; damit Erscheinen eingestellt)
- Joseph E. Drexel: Geschichte und Geschichten – Ein Leben in Franken. Vortrag: Bayerischer Rundfunk, Studio Nürnberg, 27. März 1969. Verlag Nürnberger Presse, Nürnberg 1969, Privatdruck; 38 S.; hier S. 16 f.
- Uwe Sauermann: Ernst Niekisch. Zwischen allen Fronten. Mit einem bio-bibliographischen Anhang von Armin Mohler. Herbig, München / Berlin 1980, ISBN 3-7766-1013-1, 236 S. (Herbig aktuell; Bibliographie E. Niekisch S. 219–236)
- Uwe Sauermann: Die Zeitschrift „Widerstand“ und ihr Kreis. Die publizistische Entwicklung eines Organs des extremen Nationalismus und sein Wirkungsbereich in die politische Kultur Deutschlands 1926-1934. Universität Augsburg, Philos. Fak., Diss. A, 1984, vorgelegt von Uwe Sauermann. 1984, V, 459 S. – 2. Auflage. Bibliotheksdienst Angerer, München 1985, ISBN 3-922128-15-7, V, 458 S.
- Birgit Rätsch-Langejürgen: Das Prinzip Widerstand. Leben und Wirken von Ernst Niekisch. Zugleich: Dissertation Universität München, 1994/95. Bouvier, Bonn 1997, ISBN 3-416-02608-X, 392 S. (Schriftenreihe Extremismus & Demokratie; Band 7)
