= Informationsdienst gegen Rechtsextremismus =

The Informationsdienst gegen Rechtsextremismus (IDGR) (Information Service against Right-Wing Extremism) was a German-language internet portal devoted to collecting information about persons, organisations and publications which promote far-right extremism, antisemitism and Holocaust denial. It was founded in 1998 and maintained until 2006 by Margret Chatwin. Right-wing critics have accused the IDGR of engaging in unduly exposing and defaming individuals on the political right, and of being associated with far-left extremism.
