= Green Alternative =

Green Alternative:

- The Greens – The Green Alternative, an Austrian party founded in 1986
- Green Alternative (Hungary), a political party in Hungary in 1993-2000
- The Greens–Green Alternative, a political party based in Catalonia
- Green Party – Green Alternative, a party in Croatia registered in 2003
- in Russia:
  - Civil United Green Alternative (GROZA), formerly Interregional Green Party, is a Russian movement, founded in 1991, an associate member of the European Green Party
  - Green Alternative, a Russian movement founded by Oleg Mitvol in 2009, co-founder of Green Alliance party
  - Green Alternative, a Russian political party founded in 2020.
- Green Alternative, a British national-anarchist/ecofascist group and magazine founded by Richard Hunt in the late 1990s as a breakaway from Green Anarchist
