= Negres Tempestes =

Negres Tempestes (Spanish: black tempests or storm clouds) may refer to:

- Negres Tempestes (novel), 2010, by Teresa Solana
- Negres Tempestes (organization), an anarchist, pro-Catalan independence group
