= Troy Southgate =

British far-right activist (born 1965)

- Born: 22 July 1965 (age 61); London, England
- Education: University of Kent at Canterbury (1994–97)
- Occupations: Far-right activist; writer; publisher
- Years active: 1984–present
- Known for: Founding national-anarchism

Troy Southgate (born 22 July 1965) is a British far-right political activist, writer, and a self-described national-anarchist. He has been affiliated with far-right and fascist groups, such as National Front and International Third Position. He co-created the think tank New Right alongside Jonathan Bowden and is the founder and editor-in-chief of Black Front Press.

== Early life ==
Southgate was born in Crystal Palace, London in 1965. Soon after his birth, his family moved to Crowborough in East Sussex.

== Far-right activism ==
Southgate joined the National Front in 1984. In 1987 he joined the Society of St. Pius X (SSPX). Southgate later joined the International Third Position (ITP), believing it to be ‘the legitimate heir to the National Revolutionary Movement in Britain’, though he eventually broke with it in 1992, accusing its membership of gross financial impropriety, hypocrisy, racial miscegenation and of practising a ‘bourgeois’ form of reactionary ultra-Catholic fascism incompatible with the ‘revolutionary’ nationalism that, he claimed, they had betrayed. He then formed the English Nationalist Movement (ENM).

In 1998 Southgate was partly the subject of a smear piece by former colleagues in the ITP, in the booklet Satanism and its Allies: The Nationalist Movement Under Attack, published by Final Conflict, and linking him and others that left the ITP to Satanism. Graham D. Macklin refers to this slander as an "attack" due to leaving the "staunchly Catholic ITP" although he points out that it was only later, after the original publication of the booklet, that the ITP decided for to produce an update that "singled out Southgate as a 'Satanist' and 'pro-faggot'".

In 1998, Southgate and other ENM members founded the National Revolutionary Faction. Southgate's national-anarchist ideology has been described by Graham Macklin as an opportunistic appropriation of aspects of leftist counter-culture in the service of a racist, far-right ideology. His formulation of it was influenced by Richard Hunt, a founder of Green Anarchist who had been expelled from the group for his embrace of far right views in the early 1990s to form the group Alternative Green. In the late 1990s, Hunt published a book-length expansion of his earlier pamphlet The Natural Society, entitled To End Poverty: The Starvation of the Periphery by the Core, which argues that humanity should return to hunter-gatherer living.

Hunt's magazine Alternative Green would later merge with Perspectives, the journal of the Transeuropa Collective, which was formed in 1989 to discuss "European identities, autonomies and initiatives" and which emerged from the fascist National Front's "cultural" association IONA (Islands of the North Atlantic), and had been publishing Hunt's material. Southgate encountered Hunt's writings in Perspectives, leading to a re-orientation of his ideas and the shaping of his idea of "Traditional Anarchy" based on decentralised communities. Southgate later noted that “to say that we have been hugely influenced by Richard Hunt’s ideas is an understatement”. Hunt fell ill and relinquished the editorial control of Alternative Green to Southgate. After one issue under his editorship it was suspended and replaced with a new publication entitled Terra Firma. In 2001, Southgate and the NRF were the subject of a Sunday Telegraph article, in which the NRF was accused of being a neo-Nazi organisation infiltrating animal rights groups to spread fascism.

Black Front Press was established in 2010 by Southgate to print his biography of Otto Strasser, and has subsequently become a publisher of historical, political, philosophical and esoteric texts.

== Views ==
Southgate, who graduated in history and theology from the University of Kent at Canterbury in 1997, comes from a non-religious background—although he converted to Catholicism in 1987 and was in that same year, according to Searchlight, associated with the Society of St. Pius X (SSPX). Southgate, to further his ideology of "revolutionary nationalism", later formed the English National movement, which denounced Hitler and Mussolini as "reactionary charlatans". Southgate praised fascists he felt had represented the Third Position more sincerely, such as Otto Strasser, Corneliu Zelea Codreanu, and José Antonio Primo de Rivera.

Southgate rejected Catholicism in 1997, and gravitated towards the extreme-right interpretation of traditionalism espoused by Julius Evola, particularly Evola's "spiritual racism", and synthesized this with Carl Jung's notion of the collective unconscious in order to push the idea of a "primeval Aryan psyche". The multiplicity of his influences led to his espousing an idiosyncratic form of palingenetic ultranationalism that divorced itself from the "artificial" concept of the nation-state.

Southgate subsequently incorporated green-anarchism into his perspective in order to counter the 'corrosive influence of urbanism and decay', and embraced neo-pagan and heathen groups. Along with like-minded musicians, he sought to diffuse the ideals of Mithraic paganism and Nordic folk myths into music-orientated youth cultures.

== Bibliography ==
Southgate has written and published in excess of 170 books, chiefly through Black Front Press, but the following is a list of titles published under his own name.

- Tradition and Revolution: Collected Writings of Troy Southgate
- Hitler: The Adjournment
- Nazis, Fascists or Neither: Ideological Credentials of the British Far Right, 1987-94
- Otto Strasser: The Life and Times of a German Socialist
- Adventures in Counter-Culture: Politics, Music, Film and Literature
- Further Writings: Essays on Philosophy, Religion, History & Politics
- Behold the Hammer! Nietzsche Under Scrutiny
- Imperator Romanorum: Henry the Fowler, Otto the Great & the Rise of the First German Reich
- Intellectual Gallery: A New Collection of Writings
- The Bishop of Hippo: Life and Thought of Saint Augustine
- Runic Sex Postures of the Anglo-Saxon Futhorc (with Zbigniew Boguslawski)
- The Tribe Abhorr'd: Hilaire Belloc and the Jews
- From Lightning: Corneliu Codreanu, Horia Sima and the Story of the Romanian Iron Guard
- Aesthetic Dawn and Other Romantic Verses
- Political Soldier: The Life and Death of Ernst Röhm
- Eagle of Saladin: The Life of Gamal Abdel Nasser
- Judas in Paris: The Remarkable Life of Alfred Dreyfus
- The World Through a Monocled Eye: A Detailed Exposition of Julius Evola's Men Among the Ruins
- Contra Principem: Frederick the Great and the Anti-Machiavellian Riposte
- The Self Unleashed: Max Stirner and the Politics of the Ego
- Beyond East and West: Ayatollah Khomeini & the Iranian Revolution
- Jewish Mysticism: From Pagan Antiquity and the Hebrew Prophets to the Kabbalistic Renaissance and Beyond
- Anti-Zion: A Novel
- Thinking Our Way to God: Romantic Philosophy and the Coming of Absolute Idealism
- Black Nemesis: A Critical Life of Thomas Sankara
- Hogwash & Balderdash: Peculiar Rhymes for Extraordinary Children
- Pendulum of Faith: The Lives of Douglas Hyde
- In Search of the Absolute: German Idealism in Light of Politics, Philosophy & Spirituality
- Return to Evola: A Fresh Look at Revolt Against the Modern World
- To Walk Among the Angels: The Mystical Life and Work of Emanuel Swedenborg
- Truth Dressed as a Lie: The Unmentionable Life of Arnold Spencer Leese
- Surviving Kali Yuga: A Contemporary Reading of René Guénon's The Crisis of the Modern World
- Beneath the Shade of the Lightning Tree: Georges Bataille and The Dawn of Acéphalic Man (with Von Sanngetall)
- The Spirit Unbound: Rudolf Steiner's Philosophy of Freedom
- Quest for the Numinous: The Sacred Mysticism of Rudolf Otto
- The Book of Emptiness: Learning from Japanese Philosophy
- Modernity Under the Microscope: Byung-Chul Han's Damning Critique of Contemporary Society
- Roots in the Sublime: Frithjof Schuon's Traditionalist Interpretation of the Great Religions
- Beyond the Decline: Rudolf Steiner's Visionary Critique of Oswald Spengler's Der Untergang des Abendlandes
- Existentialism Beyond Sartre: The Life & Ideas of Gabriel Marcel
- Nishitani on Nihilism: Western Philosophy through Japanese Eyes
- Chronicle of the Soul: History and Consciousness According to Rudolf Steiner
- Where the Thames Flows into the Shinano
- Gold Among Lead: Riding the Tiger with Julius Evola
- The World According to Fritz: E. F. Schumacher and the Perennial Philosophy
- Zarathustra's Legacy: Rudolf Steiner and Friedrich Nietzsche
- Twentieth-Century Romantic: Impressions of Owen Barfield
- Liberation From Within: Nishihira Tadashi and the Philosophy of No-Mind
