= Autonome Nationalisten =

European nationalist militant groups

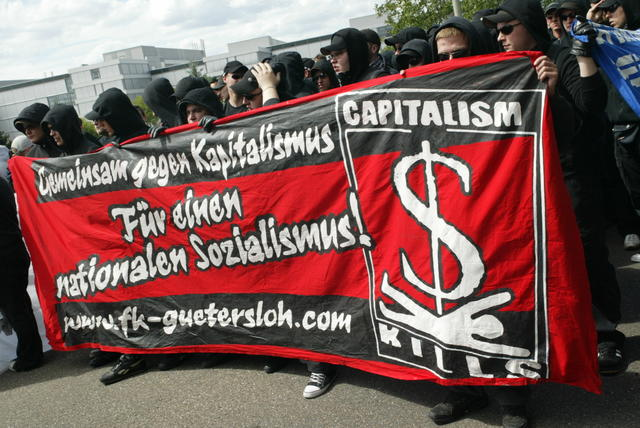
Autonome Nationalisten with an anti-capitalist banner, wearing clothing typical of left-wing black blocs

Autonome Nationalisten (English: Autonomous Nationalists, abbreviated AN) are German, British, Dutch, Finnish, and to a lesser degree Flemish, far-right nationalists, who have appropriated some of the far-left and antifa's organizational concepts (autonomous activism), demonstration tactics (black bloc), symbolism, and elements of clothing, including Che Guevara T-shirts and keffiyehs. Similar groups have also appeared in some central and eastern European countries, beginning with Poland (starting in 2009), the Czech Republic, Ukraine, Romania and Greece and others.

== History ==
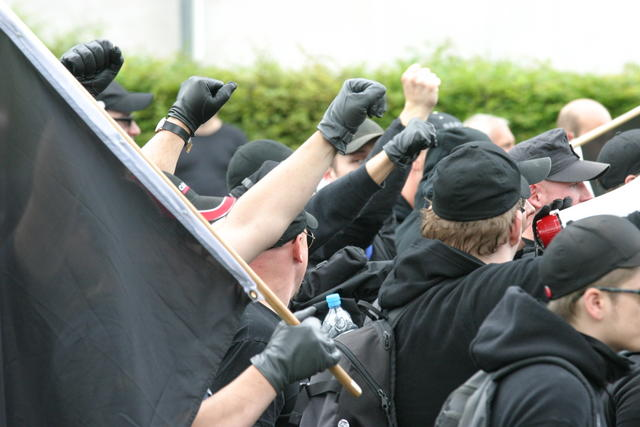
Autonomous Nationalists adopted Black Bloc demonstration tactics from left-wing antifascist groups.

The phenomenon of the Autonome Nationalisten can be traced to "Freie Nationaliste" (Free Nationalists), "Freie Kräfte" (Free Forces) and "Freie Kameradschaften" (Free Comradeships) movements, which developed in the shadow of the Nationaldemokratische Partei Deutschlands (NPD) (National Democratic Party of Germany) since the late-1980s. The police crackdown on the far-right after re-unification and the wave of banning in the early 1990s ("Deutsche Alternative", "Nationalistische Front", "Freiheitliche Deutsche Arbeiterpartei", among others) forced most of the local extreme far-right militant groups to split into "autonomous nationalist cells" of 5-20 members without a formal membership. Instead of conducting regular meetings, they started to use phones and later Internet for communication and organizing. Local cells formed loose umbrella networks in the regions to coordinate actions. In 2008, Germany's Autonomous Nationalists were estimated to number approximately 400 people, 1% of the country's neo-Nazis. The German Federal Office for the Protection of the Constitution, which provides domestic intelligence for the government, estimated the number of active participants of the far right movement in 2008 around 40,000. According to the Southern Poverty Law Center (SPLC), in 2001 there were 75 extreme-right organizations in Germany with 50,000 members.

The emergence of the Autonome Nationalisten was controversial within the German far right milieu, both because some older activists of the German extreme right objected to their "leftist" image and because the NPD feared they would complicate its efforts to take part in mainstream politics. Also controversial was that Autonome Nationalisten had occasionally expressed sympathy for Islamic extremism, as well as Hezbollah and Hamas for their opposition to Zionism and American imperialism. The same controversies arose among the far right in Poland.

The Autonomous Nationalists in Europe made themselves visible starting from 2003–2004 and are now considered more violent than other members of the European far right. However, as of 2010, according to Miroslav Mareš, their impact in these countries has been limited so far.

The Autonomous Nationalist current has been represented in Finland by a group called Musta Sydän (Black Heart) led by Ali Kaurila. The group was allegedly behind a stabbing attack on left-wing activists. Musta Sydän has also organized neo-Nazi Hardcore concerts attended by bands from Germany and Italy on the anniversary of the Kristallnacht in Turku.

== Message ==
Researchers view the syncretic political movement of the Autonomous Nationalists in Europe as a "strategic concept, organization and subculture – all three terms are possible for the designation of this phenomenon." They emphasize that,

autonomous nationalism as a political tendency certainly punches above its weight. It has influenced and sparked debates within the German far right, as well as within fascist youth movements in other European countries. As such it opens up questions over the future of fascist organisation in Europe, at a time when network politics appears to exert stronger mobilising factors than traditional organisational structures.

The Autonomous Nationalists were ideologically inspired by Strasserism. The message of AN shifted to anti-globalist, anti-capitalist, and anti-imperialist ideas. It promotes complete organizational decentralization and autonomy inside the movement.

The adoption of codes and symbols of the far left "Autonome Antifa" by the "Autonome Nationalisten" coincided with the persistence of vibrant alternative subcultures of the radical left and rejection of traditional skinhead cultural-political templates of behavior of the extreme right. The AN thus see themselves as 'autonomous' from established neo-Nazi programs and structures, developing their own ideological discourse, street message, action repertoire, music scenes and fashion codes. These are often meant to display anti-capitalist and anti-systemic rebellion and opposition to globalization and 'American cultural imperialism'. The AN also raised some social and economic issues, including poverty. As of 2011, they were firmly entrenched in the neo-Nazi movement.

== Gallery ==
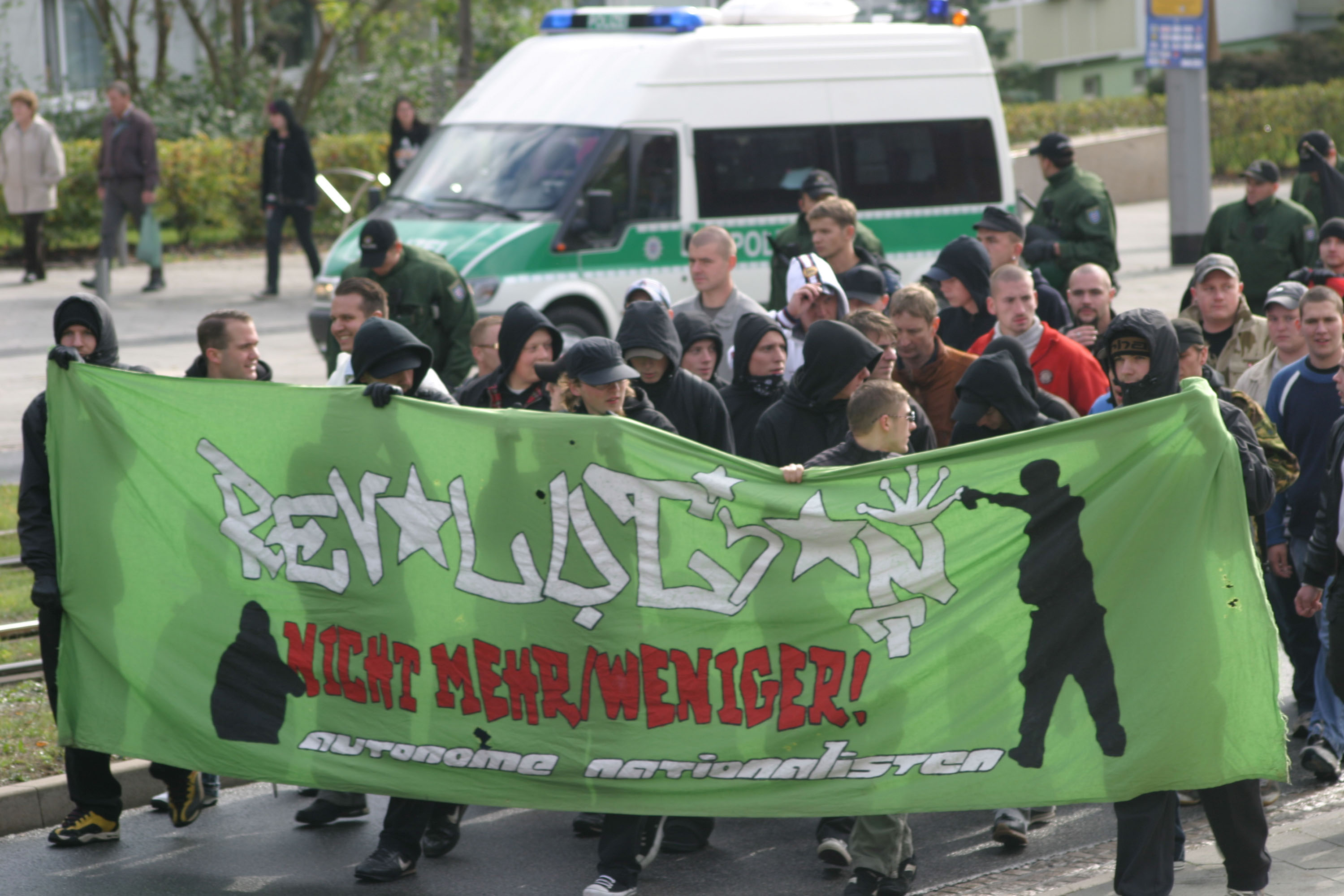
Autonome Nationalisten/Autonomous Nationalists marching behind a banner with graffiti-style lettering in 2006

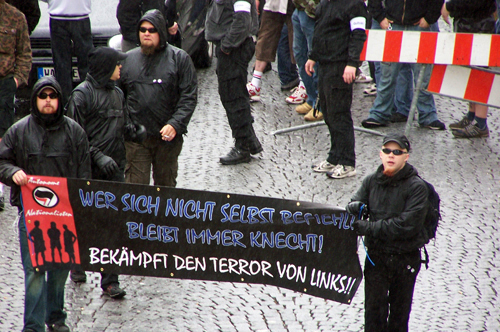
Autonome Nationalisten/Autonomous Nationalists at a 2006 protest. The black and red flags on the banner are of the Antifaschistische Aktion's logo.

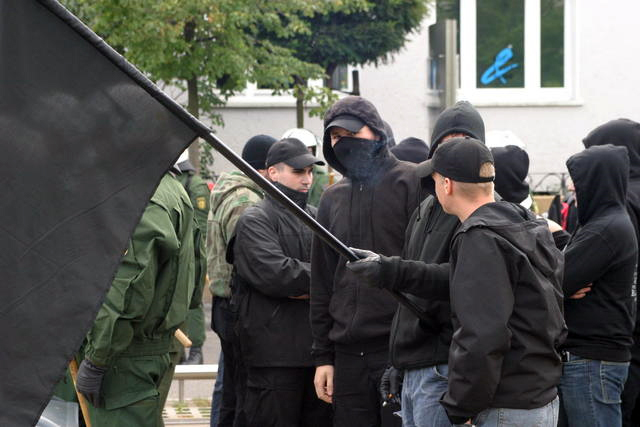
Autonome Nationalisten/Autonomous Nationalists carrying a black flag, a traditional symbol of anarchism

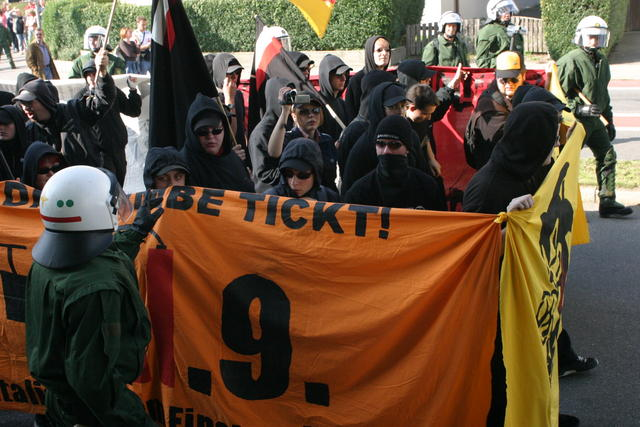
German Autonome Nationalisten/Autonomous Nationalists stage a demonstration

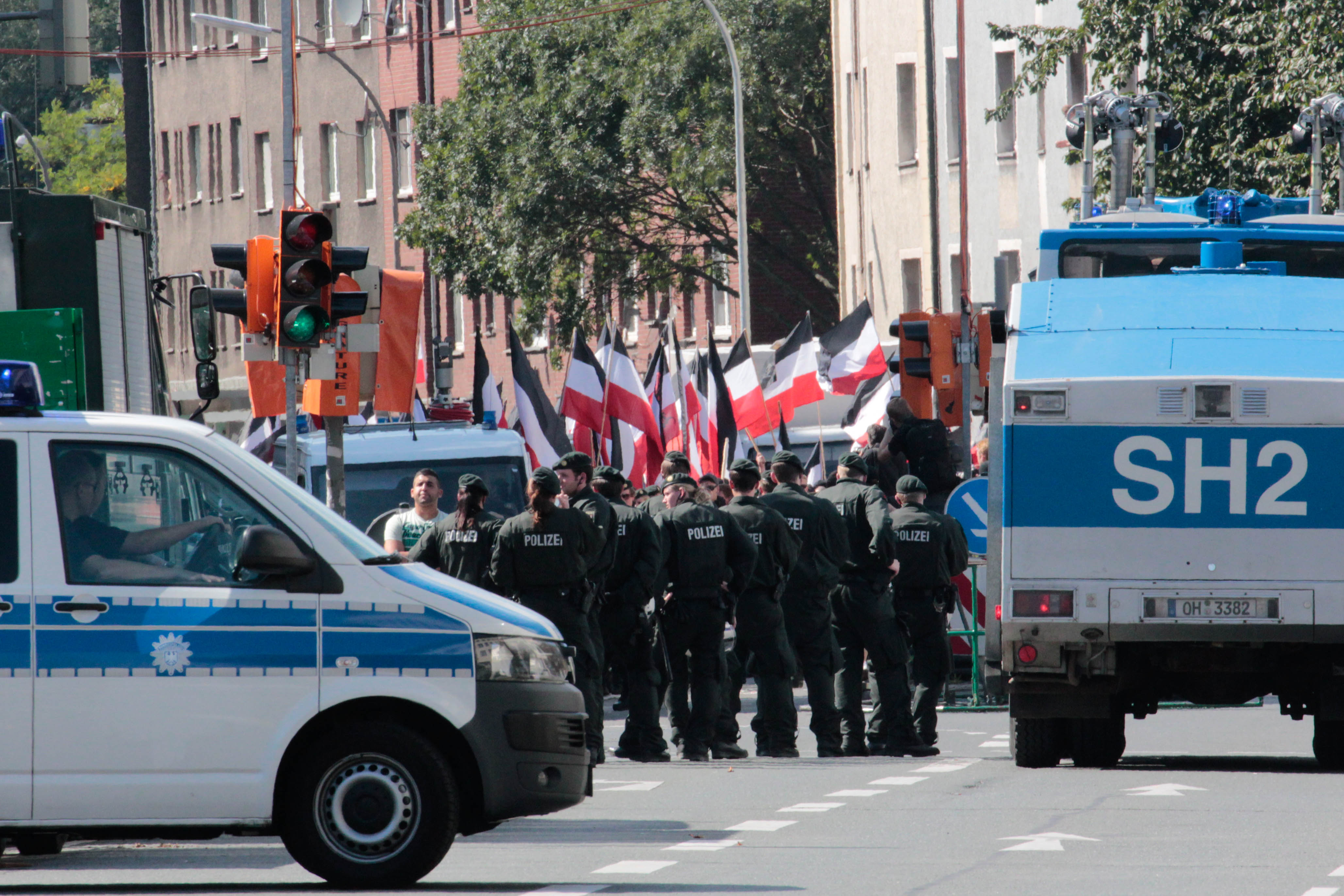
Detention of the members of the Autonome Nationalisten/Autonomous Nationalists in Dortmund

Emblem of the Ukrainian Autonomous Nationalists which is similar to Antifa's symbols

== See also ==
- Bases Autónomas
- Black Front
- Far-right politics in Germany (1945–present)
- Far-right social centre
- Far-right subcultures
- Groupe Union Défense
- National-anarchism
- National Bolshevism
- National Democratic Party of Germany
- National Socialists for Israel
- Nipster
- Political soldier
- Popular Resistance Association
- Querfront
- Third Position
- Anti-Germans
