= National Socialists for Israel =

German neo-Nazi group in support of Israel

The National Socialists for Israel (German: Nationale Sozialisten für Israel) short-form: Nasofi, were a small group within the Autonomous Nationalists that argued for Zionism from an ethnopluralist and neo-Nazi perspective.

== History ==
In late 2007, a website would be created for a supposed group of National Socialists that supported the right of Israel to exist. The reaction of other neo-Nazis and Autonomous Nationalists was largely negative, with some deeming the group a joke or fake; the Office for the Protection of the Constitution concluded however that the texts could be real. The publicly known activities of the group never went past their online postings and the sticking of stickers. According to Polylux, the group had around 20 members in 2008.

The last blog post on the group's website was published in July 2008.

== Ideology ==
The group published an initial 'manifesto' in which they described the Jews as "a healthy and strong people" who were able to preserve their "völkisch [national] identity" throughout their time in the diaspora, citing Jews as a positive nationalist example. Nasofi opposed the "mixing" of peoples and instead promoted the idea of homogeneous nation-states in accordance with the principle of ethnopluralism; this principle, Nasofi argued, should also apply to the Jewish nation and their state, Israel. The group also believed that Jews had asserted themselves in the natural competition between peoples, granting them a right to existence under the motto: "A healthy people deserves to live and a sick people deserves to die!"; Israel had fought for its right to exist within the community of nations, "Honor to whom honor is due", the group wrote. The group however believed that the "so-called Holocaust" was an act of self-deference but notes that Nazi Germany should instead have supported Zionist organizations.

Nasofi has been called the "right-wing counterpart to the pro-Israeli left-wing Anti-Germans", although Nasofi explicitly distanced themselves from the Anti-Germans.

== See also ==
- Anti-Germans (political current)
- Autonome Nationalisten
- Haavara Agreement
- Zionist antisemitism
