= Popular Resistance Association =

Russian national anarchist organization

Popular Resistance Association Ассоциация народного сопротивления
- Abbreviation: ANS (English); АНС (Russian)
- Leader: Collective leadership
- Spokesperson: Nikita Zaytsev
- Founded: 2016; 10 years ago
- Split from: National Bolshevik Party; People's Will; Volnitsa
- Ideology: Russian nationalism; Ultranationalism; Neo-Narodnichestvo; Third Position; Revolutionary nationalism; National syndicalism; National anarchism; National Bolshevism; Right-wing populism
- Political position: Far-right
- National affiliation: Nation and Freedom Committee
- Colours: Green; Black
- Slogan: "Through struggle you will attain your rights!" (Russian: "В борьбе обретёшь ты право своё!")

Party flag

Website
- vk.com/as_nar (archive)

The Popular Resistance Association (Russian: Ассоциация народного сопротивления (АНС), romanized: Assotsiatsiya narodnogo soprotivleniya, ANS) is a Russian national anarchist political organization. It was founded in 2016 by a number of former activists of People's Will, National Bolshevik Party, and other movements

== Ideology and symbolics ==
ANS combines left-wing populism with far-right views. Ideologically it combines neo-narodnichestvo, and Third Position-style views such as National Bolshevism, National-anarchism, and National Syndicalism. The ANS uses the flag of the Green armies during the Russian Civil War, as well as the Sown Field emblem.

ANS call themselves "the heirs of the centuries-old historical tradition of the national liberation struggle of our people: ... the rebels of Razin, Bulavin and Pugachev, the Decembrists, Narodnaya Volya and the Party of Socialist Revolutionaries": "We adhere to left-nationalist, narodnik views... We oppose imperialism, this is our difference from "The Other Russia", we stand for solidarity of nations, and the right to self-determination... ANS is rather a right-wing fragment of the "Left Front", which grew and was later joined by many people with left-right views".

== ANS actions ==
The first significant and annual action of the ANS was the Russian March, which activists, together with other movements, have been organizing since 2017. In addition, the Association participates in the anti-corruption protests of Alexei Navalny, holding its own actions at them. The ANS activists themselves are known to the public for their actions: in support of the protests against the construction of the Church of St. Catherine - "Apologize for the YeKB", "Our candidate is a Russian riot" in St. Petersburg - for a boycott of the 2018 Russian presidential election, "You won't throw it at everyone" - in defense of Ivan Golunov and others.

== Harassment of activists ==
ANS activists are often detained at rallies and demonstrations (including those agreed), by law enforcement officers. In November 2018, two ANS activists and the coordinator were detained on the eve of the Russian March as witnesses in a criminal case about an abandoned fire, searches were carried out in the apartments of the activists and the ANS headquarters. In the spring of 2019, information appeared about a criminal case against an activist of the Volgodonsk branch of the ANS - Vladimir Boyarinov, later activists denied this information, and Boyarinov himself said that he was specially used in order to falsify a criminal case against the ANS leadership. According to other information, Boyarinov simply used the ANS for personal gain. In the summer of 2019, during the Moscow protests on July 27, the press secretary of the ANS, Nikita Zaitsev, was detained, who later cut his veins in the police department.

On May 7 2020, at about seven in the morning, officers of the FSB, Centre E, the department for economic security and anti-corruption (OBEiPK), as well as police special forces, conducted searches at six addresses in Moscow. Operational activities took place at the ANS headquarters and in five apartments where the activists live. The front doors were cut down by the security forces before the arrival of the lawyers. The actions of the law enforcement agencies were filmed by employees of the REN TV channel. The reason for the searches was a criminal case initiated under Part 2 of Article 173.1 - illegal formation of a legal entity. The case itself was brought up against unidentified persons. These persons allegedly registered legal organizations for the ANS activists and were credited.

== See also ==
- Autonome Nationalisten
- Nation and Freedom Committee
- The Other Russia of E. V. Limonov
- National Bolshevik Party
- Skify (almanac)
- Brotherhood (Ukrainian political party) national-anarchist organization in Ukraine
