= Green Anarchist =

British magazine

- Cover of the first issue of 'Green Anarchist' magazine (Summer 1984), featuring artwork by then editor Richard Hunt
- Founding editor: Alan Albon
- Founding editor: Richard Hunt
- Founding editor: Marcus Christo
- Founded: 1984
- Country: United Kingdom
- Language: English

The Green Anarchist, established in 1984 in the UK, was a magazine advocating green anarchism.

== Early years ==
Founded after the 1984 Stop the City protests, the magazine was launched in the summer of that year by an editorial collective consisting of Alan Albon, Richard Hunt and Marcus Christo. Albon had been a member of the editorial collective of Freedom, whilst Hunt had become frustrated with the more mainstream green magazine Green Line for which he had been writing. The younger Christo had come from a more anarcho-punk background – he was also a member of Green CND, and had been involved in the blockade of Ronald Reagan's car at the 1984 Lancaster House summit meeting.

During the UK miners' strike of 1984–85 - in contrast to class struggle anarchists such as Black Flag magazine, Direct Action Movement and newly formed Class War - GA took a "largely apathetic" stance to the struggles in mining areas": according to historian of anarchism Benjamin Franks, by August 1984, it referred to the miners’ strike as being an example of "growing pockets of resistance" and by the third issue in November 1984 its editorial backed the miners, expressing sympathy for strikers who had died, but it was reserved in its support. This led to criticism from social anarchists, who argued that Green Anarchist "ignores class" and "ignores the miners’ strike".

An editorial in issue 8 stated that "it is unlikely that the [British] working class will take any revolutionary initiative" on the basis that it was implicated in the "exploitation of the peasants of the Third World". Similarly an editorial in issue 10 suggested that the striking printworkers at Wapping had actively contributed to attitudes "that have made racism, destruction of the environment, starvation in the Third World more difficult to solve" by working for News International.

Early issues featured a range of broadly anarchist and ecological ideas, bringing together groups and individuals as varied as Class War, veteran anarchist writer Colin Ward, anarcho-punk band The Poison Girls, as well as the Peace Convoy, anti-nuclear campaigners, animal rights activists and so on. However the diversity that many saw as the publication's greatest strength quickly led to strife. Within the GA editorial collective, there was a divergence between the essentially pacifist approach of Albon and Christo, and the advocacy of violent confrontation with the state favoured by Hunt. Albon and Christo left Green Anarchist, and the magazine saw a succession of editorial collectives, although Hunt remained in overall control. During this period he published articles which were increasingly alienating much of the magazine's readership.

=== Hunt's departure and Alternative Green ===
In 1991 matters came to a head after Hunt wrote an editorial which expressed support for British troops in the Gulf War and extolled the virtues of patriotism. Shortly afterwards Hunt left to start another magazine Alternative Green, which continued to promote his own particular view of green anarchism, and eventually became closely linked to the far right National-Anarchist movement from the mid-90s onwards.

In the late 1990s, Hunt published a book-length expansion of his earlier pamphlet The Natural Society, entitled To End Poverty: The Starvation of the Periphery by the Core. According to scholar of fascism, Graham Macklin, To End Poverty argues

that poverty in the ‘periphery’ is caused by western trade demands on a developing world that is starved to feed the ‘core’. This ‘progress’ represents an extension of the taxation and wage slavery that encourages the growth of an increasingly urbanized and ‘biologically unhealthy’ population, creating poverty and crime as society hurtles towards ‘total social breakdown’. Hunt's panacea is to return to ‘the original affluent society’ of the self-sufficient hunter-gatherer living in rural communes, protected by armed militias (evoking the murderous post-apocalyptic tribalism of the Mad Max trilogy) and regimented by a ‘peck order’ of ‘respect and influence’, bound by ‘kinship’, that would re-establish family values and foster a primitive communalism immune to capitalism.

Alternative Green would later merge with Perspectives, the journal of the Transeuropa Collective, which was formed in 1989 to discuss "European identities, autonomies and initiatives" and which emerged from the fascist National Front's "cultural" association IONA (Islands of the North Atlantic), and had been publishing Hunt's material. Troy Southgate, an ideologue of national-anarchism, encountered Hunt's writings in Perspectives, leading to a re-orientation of his ideas and the shaping of his idea of "Traditional Anarchy" based on decentralised communities. Southgate later noted that “to say that we have been hugely influenced by Richard Hunt's ideas is an understatement”. According to Macklin, writing in 2006:

This exposure to anarcho-primitivism has helped Southgate conceive of ‘folk autonomy’ rather than nationalism as the only true bulwark against the further encroachment of globalization... Alternative Green and its ‘overriding aversion to the Capitalist system’ was therefore an ‘ideal platform for formulating practical strategy’ to oppose capitalism. Alternative Green was soon being used by Southgate as a bridgehead to the ecological and anarchist movement in an effort to forge a ‘sincere’ alliance of ‘anti-system’ protesters from both ends of the political spectrum. To do so Southgate and others participated in the Anarchist Heretics Fair in Brighton in May 2000, which drew together several minute splinter groups from the political and cultural fringe... The furore led to Hunt's further marginalization within green anarchist circles and, despite Southgate's frequent contributions to Alternative Green, his views have not permeated further within the far right. Denounced as a ‘fascist’ Hunt found his speaking engagements cancelled, and several independent bookshops refused to stock Alternative Green.

Hunt fell ill and relinquished the editorial control of Alternative Green to Southgate. After one issue under his editorship it was suspended and replaced with a new publication entitled Terra Firma.

== The Nineties ==
Following Hunt's departure the editorial collective felt "free to promote a more pro-situ, primitivist perspective [...] and to become a more unrestrained advocate of direct action.". The new editorial collective included Paul Rogers, Steve Booth and others, who became increasingly aligned with American anarcho-primitivist writers such as John Zerzan, Bob Black and Fredy Perlman.

From 1995, the magazine expressed sympathy for the criminal activities of Ted Kaczynski and in 1998 published a notorious article entitled "The Irrationalists" that supported actions like the Oklahoma City bombing and the sarin gas attacks carried out by the Tokyo based Aum cult. This once again alienated much of the UK anarchist movement, and led to strong criticism of the magazine by Stewart Home, Counter Information, the Anarchist Communist Federation and others. Stephen Booth, the writer of the article, has since renounced the views expressed in it, as well as the primitivist movement altogether.

== The GANDALF trial ==
Starting in 1995, Hampshire Police began a series of at least 56 raids, code named 'Operation Washington', that eventually resulted in the August to November 1997 Portsmouth trial of Green Anarchist editors Steve Booth, Saxon Wood, Noel Molland and Paul Rogers, as well as Animal Liberation Front (ALF) Press Officer Robin Webb and Animal Liberation Front Supporters Group (ALFSG) newsletter editor Simon Russell. The defendants organised the GANDALF Defence campaign.

On 14 November 1997, three of the editors of Green Anarchist, Steve Booth, Noel Molland and Saxon Wood were jailed for three years for conspiracy to incite criminal damage. However, all three were shortly afterwards released on appeal.

On 26 November 1998, the case against Paul Rogers was dismissed on the grounds that the charges were wrongly worded. The Times newspaper reported that the Crown Prosecution Service had been "accused of wasting millions of pounds."

== Booth and Rogers' Green Anarchists ==
In 2001 there was a further split amongst the GA collective, leading to the existence of two entirely separate magazines using the Green Anarchist title. These were respectively published by an editorial team that included Paul Rogers and 'John Connor' (who subtitled their version of the paper as the original and best), and Steve Booth, who has publicly renounced some of his earlier published views and expressed a wish to 'return to the magazine's roots'. Both versions ceased publication in the 2000s.

== See also ==
- Green Anarchy
