= Alan Albon =

British anarchist and publisher

- Born: 24 August 1921; Edmonton, London
- Died: 30 March 1989 (aged 67); Heathrow, London
- Political party: Independent Labor Party

Alan Albon (24 August 1921 – 30 March 1989) was a British anarchist, pacifist, conscientious objector and publisher. He was born in Edmonton, London on 24 August 1921 and died at Heathrow, Greater London, on 30 March 1989.

== Early life ==
Albon was born into a Quaker family which was concerned with pacifism. In the First World War both his father and his uncle were conscientious objectors, for which they were imprisoned. His family background and the injustices of the capitalist system were the major influences which determined his political identification as an adult. Around the early 1930s, anarchist Albert Meltzer encountered Albon in London as the son of the Mayor of Edmonton, London, and a pacifist, when he was a member of the Labour Party. However, later Albon joined the youth section of the Independent Labour Party, in which as a pacifist, he was in the minority.

On leaving school, Albon worked for a very short time in an office, after which he lived in various communities. During the war years he lived in The Barn House, an agricultural community outside Brockweir in the Forest of Dean, Gloucestershire as a conscientious objector, where, because agriculture was classified as a reserved occupation, he avoided conscription into the army.

In 1945, Albon met Joan Carter at a meeting of the Peace Pledge Union, after which they were married in 1947 and built their own home, a bungalow, on a plot of two acres in Suffolk. Fellow anarchist Philip Sansom documented: 'He lived in a caravan, worked on a farm, and in the evenings and weekends he built the house from foundation to roof, complete with plumbing, electric wiring, sewage, the lot, all with his own hands.'

Most of Albon's life was concerned with the practical application of anarchism. As his brother identified, he was a builder. For example, he converted the premises of the anarchist newspaper Freedom from an old industrial building in the East End first for a bookshop and then for a printshop.' And he converted two Martello towers into houses, which his brother considered was perhaps 'his biggest job'. He also had several political commitments. For example, for more than thirty years he contributed a column, 'Land Notes' to the anarchist newspaper Freedom. Also, as fellow anarchist Nicolas Walter claimed, he was 'green long before there was a Green Movement' and was 'later a founder of the Green Anarchist paper.' He attended the Grosvenor Square demonstration about the Vietnam war, and he visited the Greenham Common Peace Camp. He participated in the squatting movement. He took a leading part in the City Farm movement. And he ended his working life as the maintenance manager of the Patchwork housing co-operative.

== See also ==
- Anarchism in the United Kingdom
