= Negres Tempestes (organization) =

Catalan anarchist group

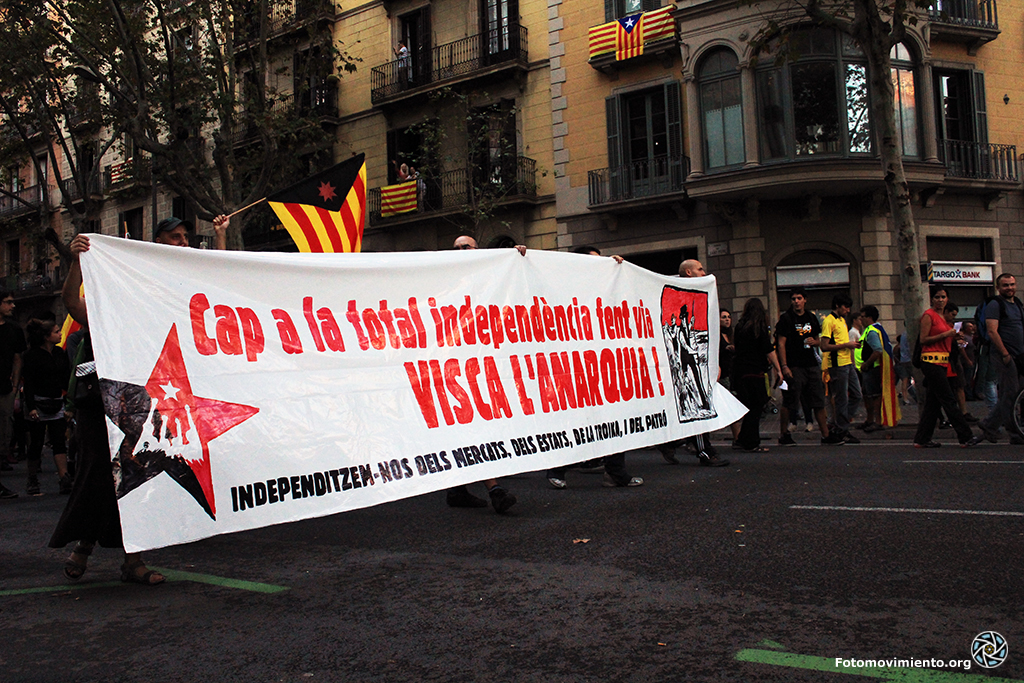
- Founded: 17 June 2005
- Location: Barcelona
- Region served: Catalan Countries
- Website: www.negrestempestes.cat

Estelada variant used by Negres Tempestes

Negres Tempestes (English: Black Storms) is an anarchist organisation based in the Catalan Countries. The group defends the principle of independence and self-determination, but opposes the creation of new statist institutions, being highly critical of the notion that independence necessitates the "attainment of a state, with the authoritarianism it implies". The organisation describes itself as opposed to "the state as a basis of authority, repression and economic exploitation" as well as "dogma, states or borders", while participating in struggles in defence of the Catalan language and culture.

The collective presented themselves to the public on 17 June 2005, after four years of encounters between various individuals in the Black Bloc of the annual 11th of September demonstrations. It gathers in and focuses much of its activity on the Can Vies Self-Managed Social Center, in the Sants district.

Negres Tempestes participated in the 2017 Catalan independence referendum and general strike, together with other Catalan anarchist groups.

== See also ==
- Postcolonial anarchism
- Anarchism and nationalism
- Democratic confederalism
- Anarchist-Communist Federation of Occitania
