= National-anarchism =

Radical right-wing nationalist ideology

National-Anarchist star

National-anarchism is a radical right-wing nationalist ideology which advocates racial separatism, racial nationalism, ethnic nationalism, and racial purity. National-anarchists syncretize ethnic nationalism with anarchism, mainly in their support for a stateless society, while rejecting anarchist social philosophy. The main ideological innovation of national-anarchism is its anti-state palingenetic ultranationalism. National-anarchists advocate homogeneous communities in place of the nation state. National-anarchists claim that those of different ethnic or racial groups would be free to develop separately in their own tribal communes while striving to be politically horizontal, economically anti-capitalist, ecologically sustainable, and socially and culturally traditional.

Although the term national-anarchism dates back as far as the 1920s, the contemporary national-anarchist movement has been put forward since the late 1990s by British strasserist Troy Southgate, who positions it as being "beyond left and right". Scholars who have studied national-anarchism conclude that it represents a further evolution in the thinking of the radical right rather than an entirely new dimension on the political spectrum.

National-anarchism has elicited skepticism and outright hostility from both left-wing and far-right critics. Critics accuse national-anarchists of being ethnonationalists who promote a communitarian and racialist form of ethnic and racial separatism while "wanting" the militant chic of calling themselves anarchists without historical and philosophical baggage that would be said to have to accompany such a claim, including the anti-racist egalitarian anarchist philosophy and the contributions of Jewish anarchists. Most scholars agree that implementing national-anarchism would not result in an expansion of freedom and describe it as an authoritarian anti-statism that would result in authoritarianism and oppression, only on a smaller scale.

== History ==
=== Origins ===
The term national-anarchist dates back as far as the 1920s. However, it would be the writings of other members of the conservative revolutionary movement such as Ernst Jünger which would later provide the philosophical foundation of the contemporary national-anarchist movement. Keith Preston, an influence on the American national-anarchist movement, "blends U.S-based influences" such as "libertarian, Christian rightist, neonazi, and Patriot movements in the United States" with ideas drawn from the European tradition of the New Right, a "right-wing decentralist" offshoot of "classical fascism" and from the German conservative revolutionary movement of the 1920s and 1930s, whose figures "influenced but mostly stood outside of the Nazi movement".

National-Anarchist Movement flag

=== Troy Southgate ===
In the mid-1990s, Troy Southgate, a former member of the British far-right National Front and founder of the International Third Position, began to move away from Strasserism and Catholic distributism towards post-left anarchy and the primitivist green anarchism articulated in Richard Hunt's 1997 book To End Poverty: The Starvation of the Periphery by the Core. However, Southgate fused his ideology with the radical traditionalist conservatism of Italian esotericist Julius Evola and the ethnopluralism and pan-European nationalism of French Nouvelle Droite philosopher Alain de Benoist to create a newer form of revolutionary nationalism called "national-anarchism".

Graham D. Macklin writes that although "at first glance the 'total insanity’ of this incongruous ideological syncretism might be dismissed as little more than a quixotic attempt to hammer a square peg into a round hole or a mischievous act of fascist Dadaism'", national-anarchism "appears as one of many groupuscular responses to globalization, popular antipathy towards which Southgate sought to harness by aligning the NRF with the resurgence of anarchism whose heroes and slogans it arrogated, and whose sophisticated critiques of global capitalist institutions and state power it absorbed and, in the case of anarchist artist Clifford Harper, whose evocative imagery it misappropriated".

Southgate claimed that his desire for a "mono-racial England" was not "racist" and that he sought "ethno-pluralism" (i.e. racial apartheid) to defend "indigenous" white culture from the 'death' of multiracial society". In claiming to defend "human diversity", Southgate "advocated 'humane' repatriation and the reordering of the globe according to racially segregated colour blocs" and "a radical policy of economic and political decentralization" in which the regions of the United Kingdom "were to be governed according to the economic principles of Catholic distributism and a wealth redistribution scheme modelled on the mediaeval guild system. The ensuing growth of private enterprise and common ownership of the means of production would end 'class war' and, ergo, the raison d'être for Marxism, and would also encourage an organic nationalist economy insulated from 'foreign' intervention". Politically, "the regions would be governed by the concept of 'popular rule' extolled by Gaddafi. The resulting restoration of economic and political freedom would re-establish the link between 'blood and soil' enabling the people to overcome the 'tidal wave of evil and liberal filth now sweeping over our entire continent'. 'Natural law' would be upheld and abortion, race mixing and homosexuality forbidden".

About Southgate's vision of Western culture, Graham D. Macklin writes that it is "saturated with a profound pessimism tempered by the optimistic belief that only by 'complete and utter defeat' can tepid materialism be expunged and replaced by the 'golden age' of Evolian Tradition: a return of the Ghibbelines of the Middle Ages or the 'medieval imperium' of the Holy Roman Empire before it collapsed into the 'internecine struggle' and 'imperialistic shenanigans' of the nation-state". Southgate's desire "to create a decentralized völkisch identity has its roots in the ideological ferment gripping National Front News and Nationalism Today in the 1980s".

In 1998, inspired by the concepts of the political soldier and leaderless resistance, Southgate formed the National Revolutionary Faction (NRF) as a clandestine cell system of professional revolutionaries conspiring to overthrow the British state. The NRF stressed this was a "highly militant strategy" and advised that some members may only fund the organization. Southgate claims that the NRF took part in anti-vivisection protests in August 2000 alongside hunt saboteurs and the Animal Liberation Front by following a strategy of entryism, but its only known public action under the national-anarchist name was to hold an anarchist heretics fair in October 2000 in which a number of fringe groups participated. After a coalition of anti-fascists and green anarchists blocked three further events from being held in 2001, Southgate and the NRF abandoned this strategy and retreated to purely disseminating their ideas in Internet forums. The NRF had long been aware of the bridging power of the Internet which provided it with a reach and influence hitherto not available to the groupuscular right. Although Southgate disbanded the group in 2003, the NRF became part of the Euro-American radical right, a virtual community of European and American right-wing extremists seeking to establish a new pan-national and ethnoreligious identity for all people they believe belong to the "Aryan race".

Shortly after, Southgate and other NRF associates became involved with Synthesis, the online journal of a forum called Cercle de la Rose Noire which sought a fusion of anti-statism, metapolitics and occultism with the contemporary concerns of the environmental and global justice movements. Through the medium of musical subcultures (black metal and neofolk music scenes) and the creation of permanent autonomous zones for neo-völkisch communes, national-anarchists hope to disseminate their subversive ideas throughout society in order to achieve cultural hegemony. The national-anarchist idea has spread around the world over the Internet, assisted by groups such as the Thule-Seminar which set up websites in the 1990s. In the United States, only a few websites have been established, but there has been a trend towards a steady increase.

=== In Germany ===
While there exists some minor overlap, the Autonomous Nationalists of Germany are generally not national-anarchists, instead only adopting anarchist and Antifa aesthetics and/or methods while typically adopting a Strasserist, or other non-anarchist, ideology.

==== Peter Töpfer ====
A proponent of the Querfront strategy and notable self-proclaimed national-anarchist (German: Nationalanarchist) in Germany is Peter Töpfer, who has been involved in the distribution of national-anarchist texts, primarily through his website nationalanarchismus.de, since the late 1990s and published the well-known fanzine Sleipnir. Töpfer has been noted for his correspondence with the neo-Nazi Christian Worch, to whom he complained about threats he had received from the Autonomous Nationalists when he showed up at an NPD-demonstration in 1998 with a black-and-red anarchy flag. Töpfer has also cooperated with the National Bolshevik Michael Koth, at the time of the Combat League of German Socialists, and associated himself with the convicted holocaust denier Horst Mahler, at whose events he and his followers apparently distributed leaflets. Leaflets, under the title "Tornado Runter" were also distributed at the 1999 Ostermarsch in Hamburg, which protested the Kosovo War, by a group called "National-Anarchists in the People's Liberation Struggle" (German: National-Anarchisten im Volksbefreiungskampf), apparently associated with Töpfer. In 2004, Töpfer published a book that consisted of a collection of his national-anarchist writing from 1997 to 2000 named nationale Anarchie.

Töpfer's ideology has apparently developed separately from that of Troy Southgate, although Töpfer did later associate somewhat with the National-Anarchist Movement. He notes his ideology to be an expression of radical anti-modernism that combines radical individualism, inspired by Max Stirner, with radical collectivism, inspired by figures like Mikhail Bakunin, combined in the will to ultimate self-determination. Töpfer contrasted his "German national-anarchism" with that of other contemporaries by declaring its roots to be pacifist, "post-left-hegelian" (German: post-linkshegelianisch), and "radical-enlightened" (German: radikal-aufklärerisch); as well as noting his movement to be anti-political in nature. Töpfer also contrasted his ideology with that of an at-the-time emergent group of "Anarcho-Nazis" in Spain and Portugal by stating that he opposes Hitlerlism. In his 2004 national-anarchist manifesto, Töpfer writes, among other thoughts, of spontaneous action and the belief that anarchism mustn't inherently mean statelessness, but only freedom from authority, an idea that has been criticized as nonsensical.

In Töpfer's sense there apparently existed two groups in Germany, one in Berlin, where Töpfer resided, and one in Hamburg, although the latter apparently did not last long. Among the supporters of Töpfer's national-anarchism was the bioregionalist Leif-Thorsten Kramps, who, among other things, advocated for ethnopluralism in an article on Töpfer's website.

==== Thilo Kabus ====
The neo-pagan and former National Democratic Party of Germany (NPD) politician Thilo Kabus independently created an ideology he termed "Anarcho-Nationalism" (German: Anarchonationalismus) which he explicitly contrasted to the national-anarchism of Peter Töpfer. Kabus was a member of the NPD for almost 20 years until ending his membership in 2003 once he started calling himself an Anarcho-Nationalist and seeking employment with the Brandenburg state parliament faction of the German People's Union (DVU); first working in the DVU's faction's press office and later being proposed as a member of the parliamentary youth welfare committee, for which he was declined by the parliament. Kabus noted that his employment was separate from his ideological convictions, stating that he would also work "for the PDS or the CDU" and that he was highly critical of the DVU, calling it bourgeoisie and reactionary. He was an ideological lone wolf, declaring himself to be the only true Anarcho-Nationalist. Kabus was a member of the Odinic Rite Germany, where he helped organize events along with his wife. He caused controversy in the German Odinic Rite, since renamed to the Association for Germanic paganism (VfGH), in 2006 when the organization's leadership was informed of his political activities, with some advocating for his expulsion. Kabus however stayed in the organization and later became the Berlin speaker of the organization, claiming to have left behind some of his views in a 2019 interview.

==== Welf Herfurth ====
Welf Herfurth a former National Democratic Party of Germany (NPD) member is an proponent of national-anarchism, after his own work "A Life in the Political Wilderness", he spread the ideology in Australia.

=== In the United States ===
==== Bay Area National Anarchists ====
National-anarchism in the United States began as a relatively obscure movement made up of probably fewer than 200 individuals led by Andrew Yeoman of the Bay Area National Anarchists (BANA) based in the San Francisco Bay Area and a couple of other groups in Northern California and Idaho. Organizations based on national-anarchist ideology have gained a foothold in Russia and have been accused of sowing turmoil in the environmental movement in Germany. There are adherents in Australia, England and Spain, among other nations. In the San Francisco Bay Area, BANA began appearing in public only in late 2007. Since then, BANA members protested alongside the Christian right with "Keep Our Children Safe" signs and began forming "a fleeting alliance" with the American Front, a white supremacist skinhead group based in California.

On 8 September 2007, the anti-globalization movement mobilized in Sydney against neoliberal economic policies by opposing the Asia-Pacific Economic Cooperation summit. During the street protests, national-anarchists infiltrated the anarchist black bloc, but the police had to protect them from being expelled by irate activists. Since then, national-anarchists have joined other marches in Australia and in the United States. In April 2008, national-anarchists protested on behalf of the Tibetan independence movement against the Chinese government during the 2008 Summer Olympics torch relay in both Canberra and San Francisco. National-anarchists are carefully studying the successes and failures of their more prominent international counterparts whilst attempting to similarly win converts from the radical environmentalist and white nationalist movements in the United States.

A December 2008 report by the Political Research Associates, described as "a Massachusetts-based progressive think tank", stated that "[t]he danger National Anarchists represent is not in their marginal political strength, but in their potential to show an innovative way that fascist groups can re-brand themselves and reset their project on a new footing. They have abandoned many traditional fascist practices — including the use of overt neo-Nazi references. In [their] place they offer a more toned down, sophisticated approach [...] often claiming not to be 'fascist' at all". Similarly, anarchists, who are anti-racists, have been aware of national-anarchists "attempting to infiltrate and exploit their scene" since at least 2005. Entryism, defined as "the name given to the process of entering or infiltrating bona fide organizations, institutions and political parties with the intention of gaining control of them for our own ends", is one of national anarchists' principal tactics. In The Case for National-Anarchist Entryism, Southgate called for national-anarchists to join political groups and then "misdirect or disrupt them for our own purposes or convert sections of their memberships to our cause".

On December 28, 2008, BANA members, dressed with hoodies emblazoned with "Smash All Dogmas" on the back and "New Right" on both sleeves, joined "a protest of several thousand against Israel's bombing of the Gaza Strip. Practicing full-blown entryism, they marched between groups carrying the Palestinian flag and the gay-pride flag, while shouting, "F---, F---, F--- Zionism!" BANA members later started carrying "a black flag with the letter Q in one corner" in reference to "Yeoman's claim that his ancestors rode with Quantrill's Raiders, a notoriously violent pro-Confederate guerrilla outfit that battled for control of the border state of Missouri during the Civil War". BANA members follow Julius Evola, described as "an esoteric Italian writer and 'spiritual racist' lionized by modern-day fascists", in believing themselves to be "in revolt against the modern world". BANA's website includes "long-winded blog posts predicting the imminent collapse of multicultural liberalism" and "carries notes of high praise for neo-Confederate secessionist groups like the League of the South and the Republic of South Carolina. Some of the site's content is unintentionally comical. For example, BANA exalts the lily-white town of Mayberry in the 1960s TV sitcom The Andy Griffith Show as 'a realized anarchist society'".

Writing for the Southern Poverty Law Center, Casey Sanchez argues that national-anarchism "is really just another white nationalist project". According to Sanchez, national anarchists advocates "racial separatism and white racial purity. They're also fiercely anti-gay and anti-Israel". BANA envisions "a future race war leading to neo-tribal, whites-only enclaves to be called 'National Autonomous Zones'". BANA co-founder Andrew Yeoman told the Intelligence Report that "[w]e are racial separatists for a number of reasons, such as our desire to maintain our cultural continuity, the principle of voluntary association, and as a self-defensive measure to protect each other from being victimized by crime from other races". Sanchez describes BANA members "and other likeminded national anarchists" as cloaking "their bigotry in the language of radical environmentalism and mystical tribalism, pulling recruits from both the extreme right and the far left". Sanchez quotes Yeoman as saying that BANA is "an extremely diverse group. We have ex-liberals, ex-neo-cons, we have Ron Paul supporters, we have ex-skinheads, we have apolitical people that have been turned on to our causes".

On May Day 2010, BANA participated in the Golden Gate Minuteman Project's march in front of San Francisco City Hall in support of Arizona SB 1070, an anti-immigration Senate bill. The march took place during International Workers' Day demonstrations as an attempt to counter mass protest against the bill in Mission District, San Francisco. Local news media reported that Yeoman and four other national-anarchists were physically assaulted by about ten protesters as they left the march.

According to Matthew N. Lyons, "freedom from government tyranny has always been a central theme of right-wing politics in the United States". Lyons cites "the original Ku Klux Klan that denounced 'northern military despotism'" and the Tea Party movement, "who vilify Barack Obama as a combination of Hitler and Stalin", as examples of the radical right, of which national-anarchism is part of, that has invoked "the evil of big government to both attract popular support and justify their own oppressive policies". Lyons describes "the rise of so-called National-Anarchism (NA), an offshoot of British neonazism that has recently gained a small but fast-growing foothold in the United States", writing that national-anarchists advocate "a decentralized system of 'tribal' enclaves based on 'the right of all races, ethnicities and cultural groups to organize and live separately'". While criticizing "statism of both the left and the right, including classical fascism", national-anarchists "participate in neonazi networks such as Stormfront.org and promote anti-Jewish conspiracy theories worthy of The Protocols of the Elders of Zion". According to Lyons, anti-statism is "a key part of National-Anarchism's appeal and helps it to deflect the charge of fascism".

==== Keith Preston ====
American Keith Preston, a proponent of the national-anarchist movement who promotes an authoritarian anti-statist "eclectic synthesis" called "anarcho-pluralism" and advocating "a revolutionary alliance of leftist and rightist libertarians against U.S. imperialism and the state", argues that despite the anti-Americanism of European national-anarchists and the patriotism of American paleoconservatives, classical American ideals of Jeffersonian democracy are reconcilable with national-anarchism because of their common values, namely agrarianism, localism, regionalism and traditional values. Preston's opposition to oppression is linked only to the state, arguing that "the state is a unique force for destruction". In The Thoughts That Guide Me: A Personal Reflection (2005), Preston wrote that "what I champion is not so much the anarchist as much as the 'anarch,' the superior individual who, out of sheer strength of will, rises above the herd in defiance and contempt of both the sheep and their masters". Preston is described as "the moving force behind" the anti-state website Attack the System and the American Revolutionary Vanguard, its affiliate organization".

According to Matthew N. Lyons, "Preston's own relationship with fascism is much closer than he acknowledges. While he lacks fascism's drive to impose a single ideological vision on all spheres of society, he offers a closely related form of revolutionary right-wing populism. Above all, Preston and his rightist allies embody the main danger associated with fascism — to preempt the radical left as the main revolutionary opposition force". Lyons describes Preston as "an intelligent, prolific writer" who has "established himself over the past decade as a respected voice in libertarian, paleoconservative, and 'Alternative Right' circles", hence "in some ways even more dangerous" because it "represents a sophisticated reworking of far right politics that is flexible, inclusive, and appeals to widely held values such as 'live and let live'", having the potential to create a bridge that is unlike most far-right ideologies between national-anarchists and "a wide variety of rightist currents such as white nationalists, Patriot/militia groups, Christian rightists, [...] and even some left-wing anarchists, liberal bioregionalists/environmentalists, and nationalist people of color groups".

Although claiming "many leftist ideas in his political philosophy and apparently is still in touch with some actual leftists", unlike other far-rightists who advocate Third Position, Lyons describes Preston as a "former left-wing anarchist", arguing that his politics "are fundamentally right wing with a leftist gloss". While defending his choice to "collaborate with racialists and theocrats", Preston has nonetheless called for "a purge, if not an outright pogrom" in an effort "to drive anti-racist whites, feminists, and queer activists from the anarchist movement" in order to "attract more young rebels into our ranks", although Preston later claimed that critics had taken this statement "way too seriously". Lyons describes Preston as "an individualist who does not directly advocate the racial determinism and separatism of his friends the National-Anarchists". Lyons describes Preston's call for a "pan-secessionist" strategy as being based on "a coalition of those across the political spectrum who want to carve out separate, self-governing political enclaves free" of American government and imperialist control. Lyons includes "Marxist-Leninists, white separatists, libertarians, neo-Confederates, indigenous rights activists, Christian rightists, Islamic rightists, militant environmentalists, and anti-Zionist Orthodox Jews" as "a broad array of potential partners" for Preston's "pan-secessionist" strategy.

Preston embraces a conservative view of regarding human nature and society, whose tenets include "natural inequality of persons at both the individual and collective levels, [and] the inevitability and legitimacy of otherness". Preston is described as being "harshly critical of the left's egalitarianism and universalism. Instead, he offers an elitist, anti-humanist philosophy that echoes Friedrich Nietzsche, Ernst Jünger, and Ayn Rand". While stating that it would be a mistake "to see Preston's elitism as a mask for bigotry against any specific group of people", Lyons argues that "standard right-wing prejudices periodically creep into his prose". Lyons states that "Preston only acknowledges oppression along lines of race, gender, sexuality, or other factors to the extent that these are directly promoted by the state, particularly through formal, legal discrimination against specific groups of people", ignoring or trivializing "the dense network of oppressive institutions and relationships that exist outside of, and sometimes in opposition to, the state".

According to Lyons, "it is these societally based systems of oppression, not state intervention, that perpetuate dramatic wealth disparities between whites and people of color, widespread domestic violence that overwhelmingly target women, and suicide rates much higher among LGBT teens than heterosexual teens, among many other examples". Lyons further argues that merely "dismantling the central state won't abolish other systems of oppression. It will simply create a power vacuum where they can function in a more fragmented, unregulated way. This is a recipe for warlordism, a chaotic society where anyone with enough physical force can make the rules". In contrast to Preston, Lyons concludes that "authoritarianism doesn't require a large centralized state, but can operate on any scale, such as a region, a neighborhood, or a family. With no program for liberation except ending big government, pan-secessionism", as advocated by national-anarchists such as Preston, "would foster many smaller-scale authoritarian societies".

== Ideology ==
The conservative revolutionary concept of the anarch as articulated by German philosopher Ernst Jünger is central to national-anarchism. National-anarchists stress that the "artificial nationalism" of the nation state which they claim to oppose must be distinguished from the primordial "natural nationalism" of the people (volk) which they believe in its more consistent expressions is a legitimate rejection of both foreign domination (imperialism) and internal domination (statism). National-anarchists see "American global capitalism", consumerism, globalization, immigration, liberalism, materialism, modernity, multiculturalism, multiracialism and neoliberalism as the primary causes of the social decline of nations and cultural identity. They propose a strategic and ideological alliance of ethnic and racial nationalists and separatists around the world (especially in the Global South), neo-Eurasianists in Russia, Islamists in Muslim-majority countries and anti-Zionists everywhere to resist the New World Order—globalization viewed as an instrument of American imperialism and the antisemitic canard of Jewish-dominated international banking—that is inevitably leading to global economic collapse and ecological collapse.

National-anarchism expresses a desire to reorganize human relationships with an emphasis on replacing the hierarchical structures of the state and capitalism with local community decision-making. However, national-anarchists stress the restoration of the "natural order" and aim towards a decentralized social order where each new tribe builds and maintains a permanent autonomous zone for a self-sufficient commune which is economically mutualist, ecologically sustainable and socially and culturally traditional. Politically, national-anarchists believe in something of a meritocratic system, wherein leaders would rise to their positions based on their talents. These leaders, however, would not have any sort of vested authority, and would be more akin to big men than rulers. Asserting the right to difference, national-anarchists publicly advocate a model of society in which communities that wish to practice racial, ethnic, religious and/or sexual separatism are able to peacefully coexist alongside mixed or integrated communities without requiring force. National-anarchists claim that "national autonomous zones" (NAZs) could exist with their own rules for permanent residence without the strict ethnic divisions and violence advocated by other forms of "blood and soil" ethnic nationalism. National-anarchist Andrew Yeoman has stated that this racial segregation is actually a belief adopted from anarchists of color, who sometimes refuse to allow those of white descent into their spaces.

Some leading national-anarchists have stated in the past as having originally conceived the idea of establishing whites-only NAZs which have seceded from the state's economy as no-go areas for unwelcomed ethnic groups and state authorities. In their view, this was an insurrectionary strategy to foment civil disorder and racial tensions as an essential prelude to racial civil war and the collapse of the global capitalist system. National-anarchists such as Keith Preston advocate "a vision of revolutionary change that centers on replacing centralized nation-states with a diverse array of small-scale political entities". According to Preston, "anarcho-pluralism" is "anti-universalist" because "it rejects the view that there is one 'correct' system of politics, economics, or culture that is applicable much less obligatory for all people at all times and in all places". According to this view, "any group of people could organize and govern themselves as they wished, as long as they leave other groups free to do the same. These self-governing units could be based on ethnicity, religion, gender, sexual orientation, political philosophy, or cultural practice". For those national-anarchists, this is "the best possible method of avoiding the tyrannies and abuses of overarching Leviathan states, and accommodating the irreconcilable differences concerning any number of matters that all societies inevitably contain".

In terms of cultural and religious views, national-anarchists are influenced by the radical traditionalism and spiritual racism of Julius Evola, who called for a "revolt against the modern world". National-anarchists have a pessimistic vision of modern Western culture yet optimistically believe that "the decline of the West" will pave the way for its materialism to be expunged and replaced by the idealism of the primordial tradition. Although some adhere to a form of Christian Identity, most of its members within the national-anarchist movement reject Christianity because those national-anarchists believe it to be a Semitic religion that usurped the "Aryan" racial legacy of Mithraism as the historically dominant religion and moral system of the West. National-anarchists embrace a spiritual anarchism based on different forms of neopaganism, occultism and the ethnic religion of national mysticism, especially Nordic racial paganism which they view as genuine expressions of Western spirituality, culture and identity that can also serve as an antidote to the socially alienating effects of consumer culture. National-anarchists hold racial separatism and cultural revitalization through the establishment of confederations of autonomous neo-völkisch communes as the ultimate barrier against globalized racial mixing and cultural homogenization.

== Position on the political spectrum ==
Scholars who have examined national-anarchism consider it to be on the radical right.

In his 2003 essay "From Slime Mould to Rhizome: An Introduction to the Groupuscular Right", Roger Griffin argued that national-anarchism is a segment of the groupuscular right which has evolved towards a "mazeway resynthesis" between "classic fascism, third positionism, neo-anarchism and new types of anti-systemic politics born of the anti-globalization movement", whose main ideological innovation is a stateless palingenetic ultranationalism.

In his 2005 essay "Co-opting the Counter Culture: Troy Southgate and the National Revolutionary Faction", described as a "case study of the National Revolutionary Faction (NRF)" which "provides a salutary example of fascism's cogent syncretic core and its ability to produce novel and pragmatic syntheses", Graham D. Macklin argued that the conservative revolutionary concept of the anarch provides sanction for the ideological shapeshifting and unrestrained syncretism of national-anarchism, allowing its adherents to assert they have transcended the dichotomy of conventional politics to embrace higher political forms that are "beyond left and right". While stating that national-anarchists claim to promote "a radical anti-capitalist and anti-Marxist 'anarchist' agenda of autonomous rural communities within a decentralized, pan-European framework", Macklin further argued that despite a protean capacity for change, far-right groupuscules retain some principles which he calls core fascist values (anti-communism, anti-liberalism, anti-Marxism, violent direct action, palingenesis, Third Positionism and ultranationalism), describing national-anarchism as "racist anti-capitalism" and "communitarian racism". Macklin concludes that national-anarchism is a synthesis of anarcho-primitivism and the radical traditionalist conservatism of Julius Evola in a "revolt against the modern world". Macklin concludes that "[a]lthough Southgate's impact on left-wing counter-cultural concerns has been completely negligible, this case study of the NRF's wanton intellectual cannibalism shows that groupuscular fascism poses a clear danger, particularly for ecological subcultures whose values are profoundly different from the ecological agenda mooted by the far right. [...] If this article is anything to go by, then anarchist, ecological and global justice movements need to remain on their guard in order to ensure that the revolution will not be national-Bolshevized".

In his 2005 book The Radical Right in Britain: Social Imperialism to the BNP, Alan Sykes argued that national-anarchism represents a further evolution in the thinking of the radical right rather than an entirely new dimension, a response to the new situation of the late 20th century in which the process of globalization (cultural, economic and political) and the apparent triumph of materialist capitalism in the form of economic materialism and neoliberalism on a global scale requires a greater assertion of the centrality of anti-materialist and idealistic ethnic nationalism.

== Analysis and reception ==
National-anarchism has critics on both the left and right of the political spectrum as they both look upon their politics with skepticism, if not outright hostility, mainly because of the multifaceted threat they conclude it represents. Scholarly analysis asserts that national-anarchism is a "Trojan horse for white nationalism" and represents what many anti-fascists see as the potential new face of fascism. This analysis argues that it is a form of crypto-fascism which hopes to avoid the stigma of classical fascism by appropriating symbols, slogans and stances of the anarchist movement while engaging in entryism to inject some core fascist values into the anti-globalization and environmental movements. According to scholars, national-anarchists hope to draw members away from traditional white nationalist groups to their own synthesis of ideas which national-anarchists claim are "neither left nor right". Some scholars also warn that the danger national-anarchists represent is not in their marginal political strength, but in their potential to show an innovative way that neo-fascist groups can rebrand themselves and reset their project on a new footing in order to preempt the radical left as the main revolutionary opposition force. Even if the results are modest, this can disrupt left-wing social movements and their focus on egalitarianism and social justice, instead spreading separatist ideas based on antifeminism, antisemitism, heterosexism, naturalistic fallacy and racism amongst grassroots activists.

Scholars have reported how far-right critics argue that neo-Nazis joining the national-anarchist movement will lead to them losing credit for the successes of their anti-Zionist struggle if it is co-opted by anarchists. Scholars further noted how those far-right critics argue that national-anarchists want the militant chic of calling themselves anarchists without the historical and philosophical baggage that accompanies such a claim, namely the link with 19th-century Jewish anarchists. Scholars such as Graham D. Macklin use apostrophes when describing national-anarchists' "anarchism" and write that "despite its alleged 'anarchism', [it] looks favourably on the heptarchy of Anglo-Saxon England as a model of racial 'kingship'". Macklin describes national-anarchism as "a seemingly incongruous synthesis of fascism and anarchism" that owes more the "conservative revolutionary thought" of the anarcha than anarchism as it is "totally devoid of anarchism's humanistic social philosophy, which is rejected as 'infected' with feminism, homosexuality and Marxism". Macklin also argues that "[its] political organization reveals the NRF to be closer in inspiration to the Leninist 'revolutionary vanguard' than anarchism".

Scholars such as Matthew N. Lyons argue that implementing national-anarchism would not result in an expansion of freedom as its proponents claim and that "in reality it would promote oppression and authoritarianism in smaller-scale units". According to Lyons, the opposition to the state of national-anarchists such as Keith Preston is based on "a radically anti-humanistic philosophy of elitism, ruthless struggle, and contempt for most people".

== See also ==
- Alt-right
- Anarcho-capitalism
- Anarcho-communism
- Counter-Enlightenment
- Crusade of Romanianism
- Ecofascism
- Ethnocacerism
- Eumeswil
- Far-right social centre
- Issues in anarchism
- Kinism
- Nationalism and Anarchism
- National syndicalism
- Nativism
- Neo-feudalism
- Neo-Luddism
- Pedro Durruti
- Peste Noire
- Popular Resistance Association
- Right-libertarianism
- Ruscism
- Sovereign citizen movement
- Sorelianism
- Survivalism
- Traditionalist School
- Ted Kaczynski
- Yegor Letov
- White genocide conspiracy theory

== Sources ==
=== Books and journal articles ===
- Dahl, Göran (1999). Radical Conservatism and the Future of Politics. London: SAGE Publications. ISBN 978-0-7619-5414-9.
- Goodrick-Clarke, Nicholas (2003). Black Sun: Aryan Cults, Esoteric Nazism and the Politics of Identity. New York: New York University Press. ISBN 978-0-8147-3155-0.
- Griffin, Roger (March 2003). "From Slime Mould to Rhizome: An Introduction to the Groupuscular Right". Patterns of Prejudice. 37 (1): 27–63. doi:10.1080/0031322022000054321. S2CID 143709925.
- Lyons, Matthew N. (Summer 2011). "Rising Above the Herd: Keith Preston's Authoritarian Anti-Statism". New Politics. 7 (3).
- Macklin, Graham D. (September 2005). "Co-opting the Counter Culture: Troy Southgate and the National Revolutionary Faction". Patterns of Prejudice. 39 (3): 301–326. doi:10.1080/00313220500198292. S2CID 144248307.
- Preston, Keith (2003). The Failure of Anarchism. London: Black House Publishing. ISBN 9781910881361.
- Ross, Alexander Reid (2017). Against the Fascist Creep. Oakland: AK Press. ISBN 9781849352444. OCLC 1023827103.
- Sanchez, Casey (Summer 2009). "'National Anarchism': California racists claim they're Anarchists". Intelligence Report.
- Sunshine, Spencer (Winter 2008). "Rebranding Fascism: National-Anarchists". The Public Eye. 23 (4): 1, 12–19.
- Sykes, Alan (2005). The Radical Right in Britain: Social Imperialism to the BNP (British History in Perspective). New York: Palgrave Macmillan. ISBN 978-0-333-59923-5.
- Whine, Michael (January 1999). "Cyberspace: A New Medium for Communication, Command, and Control by Extremists". Studies in Conflict & Terrorism. 22 (3): 231–245. doi:10.1080/105761099265748. Archived from the original on 22 October 2006.

=== News articles ===
- Gulezian, Lisa; Hollyfied, Amy (1 May 2010). "Thousands across Bay Area protest AZ immigration law". KGO-TV. Archived from the original on 4 May 2010.
- Mercer, Neil; Chesterton, Andrew (9 September 2007). "Scaremongering - Fears of violent demonstrations unfounded". The Sunday Telegraph. p. 14.
- Smiley, Lauren (1 May 2010). "Post-immigration march scuffle targets National Anarchists". San Francisco Weekly. Archived from the original on 24 February 2016.
