= Palingenetic ultranationalism =

Concept concerning generic fascism

Palingenetic ultranationalism is a definition of "true fascism" proposed by the British political theorist Roger Griffin, who coined the term in his 1991 book The Nature of Fascism. A key element is the belief that fascism can be defined by what Griffin posits to be its true core myth: the need for a social revolution to occur first before a "national rebirth", palingenesis, could then take place.

Griffin argues that the unique synthesis of palingenesis, populism and ultranationalism differentiates fascism from para-fascism and other authoritarian, nationalist ideologies. He asserts that this is the "fascist minimum", without which, according to his definition, there can be no "true fascism". Griffin himself describes fascism as a political philosophy built on the "perverse mythic logic" of destruction, which the fascist believes will then be followed by some form of political rebirth.

== History ==
The idea was first put forth in the 1991 book The Nature of Fascism and was expanded in the paper "Staging the Nation's Rebirth: The Politics and Aesthetics of Performance in the Context of Fascist Studies" in the 1994 volume Fascism and Theatre: The Politics and Aesthetics in the Era of Fascism. Griffin's theory of "true fascism" is a recent philosophical development and is not explicitly stated in earlier political treatises on fascism, such as in Benito Mussolini's "Doctrine of Fascism", and others. While earlier works do describe the idea of fascism as being "revolutionary", they do not list a "revolution" as being a necessary precursor to fascism.

Griffin argues that fascism uses the "palingenetic myth" to attract large masses of voters who have lost their faith in traditional politics and religion by promising them a brighter future under fascist rule. That promise is not made exclusively by fascists: other political ideologies also incorporate some palingenetic aspects in their party programmes since politicians almost always promise to improve the situation. More radical movements often want to overthrow the old order, which has become decadent and alien to the common man. That powerful and energetic demolition of the old ways may require some form of revolution or battle, which is, however, represented as glorious and necessary. Such movements thus compare the (recent) past with the future, which is presented as a rebirth of society after a period of decay and misery. The palingenetic myth can also possibly stand for a return to a golden age in the country's history so that the past can be a guidebook to a better tomorrow, with an associated regime that superficially resembles a reactionary one. Fascism distinguishes itself by being the only ideology that focuses strongly on the revolution in its myth or, as Griffin puts it:

the mythical horizons of the fascist mentality do not extend beyond this first stage. It promises to replace gerontocracy, mediocrity and national weakness with youth, heroism and national greatness, to banish anarchy and decadence and bring order and health, to inaugurate an exciting new world in place of the played-out one that existed before, to put government in the hands of outstanding personalities instead of non-entities.

Through all of that, there would be one great leader who would battle the representatives of the old system with grassroots support. In the fascist utopia, one mass of people will supposedly appear who have only one goal: to create their new future. Such a fascist movement would ideally have infinite faith in its mythical hero who would stand for everything the movement believes in. According to this utopian ideology, under the guidance of their leader the country would then rise like a phoenix from the ashes of corruption and decadence.

== Contemporary examples ==
National-anarchism has been argued to be a syncretic political ideology that was developed in the 1990s by former Third Positionists to promote a "stateless palingenetic ultranationalism".

== See also ==
- Eternal return (Eliade)
- Great Replacement conspiracy theory
- Reactionary
- Reactionary modernism
- Revanchism
