= Alternative for Germany =

Far-right political party in Germany

Alternative for Germany Alternative für Deutschland
- Abbreviation: AfD
- Co-leaders: Tino Chrupalla; Alice Weidel
- Deputy co-leaders: Stephan Brandner; Peter Boehringer; Kay Gottschalk
- Parliamentary leaders: Tino Chrupalla; Alice Weidel
- Honorary chairman: Alexander Gauland
- Founders: Alexander Gauland; Bernd Lucke; Konrad Adam
- Founded: 6 February 2013; 13 years ago
- Split from: Christian Democratic Union of Germany
- Headquarters: Schillstraße 9 10785 Berlin
- Think tank: Desiderius-Erasmus-Stiftung
- Youth wing: Generation Germany
- Membership (July 2026): ▲ c. 75,000
- Ideology: Right-wing populism; National conservatism; Euroscepticism; Faction: Völkisch nationalism
- Political position: Far-right; 2013–2015: Right-wing
- European affiliation: Europe of Sovereign Nations Party (since 2024) (Note: The party was formerly part of the Alliance for Direct Democracy in Europe (2016–2017) and the Identity and Democracy Party (2023–2024).)
- European Parliament group: Europe of Sovereign Nations Group (since 2024) (Note: The party was formerly part of the European Conservatives and Reformists (2014–2016), Europe of Freedom and Direct Democracy (2016–2019), Identity and Democracy (2019–2024), and Non-Inscrits (2024).)
- Colours: Light blue
- Slogan: Zeit für Deutschland. ('Time for Germany.')
- Bundestag: 151 / 630
- Bundesrat: 0 / 69
- State Parliaments: 361 / 1,898
- European Parliament: 15 / 96
- Heads of State Governments: 0 / 16

Website
- afd.de
- Politics of Germany; Political parties; Elections; A: Academics have generally described only a faction of the AfD as völkisch nationalist. Some have argued the entire party fits this description, and criticised designations of right-wing populist or national conservative as euphemistic. B: The AfD was not a radical right-wing party in its early phase, but moved to the populist radical right in 2015 with the replacement of its first leadership. As of 2025, the Federal Office for the Protection of the Constitution has identified the AfD as being an "extreme right" political party.

Alternative for Germany (German: Alternative für Deutschland, AfD [aːʔɛfˈdeː]) is a far-right, right-wing populist, national conservative, and in parts völkisch nationalist (Note: Academics have generally described only a faction of the AfD as völkisch nationalist. Some have argued the entire party fits this description and criticised designations of right-wing populist or national conservative as euphemistic.) political party in Germany. It has 151 members of the Bundestag and 15 members of the European Parliament. It is the largest opposition party in the Bundestag and a member of the Europe of Sovereign Nations Group in the European Parliament.

Its name reflects its resistance to the mainstream policies of Angela Merkel and her slogan Alternativlosigkeit (lit. 'alternative-less-ness', a German version of "there is no alternative"). Established in April 2013, AfD narrowly missed the 5% electoral threshold to sit in the Bundestag during the 2013 federal election. The party won seven seats in the 2014 European Parliament election in Germany as a member of the European Conservatives and Reformists (ECR). After securing representation in 14 of the 16 German state parliaments by October 2017, AfD won 94 seats in the 2017 federal election and became the third-largest party in the country, as well as the largest opposition party; its lead candidates were the co-vice chairman Alexander Gauland and Alice Weidel, the latter having served as the party group leader in the 19th Bundestag. In the 2021 federal election, AfD dropped to being the fifth-largest party in the 20th Bundestag. Following the 2025 federal election, it became the second-largest party and the largest opposition party in the 21st Bundestag.

AfD was founded by Gauland, Bernd Lucke, and former members of the Christian Democratic Union of Germany (CDU) to oppose the policies of the eurozone as a right-wing and moderately Eurosceptic alternative to the centre-right but pro-European CDU. The party presented itself as an economically liberal, Eurosceptic, and conservative movement in its early years. AfD subsequently moved further to the right, and expanded its policies under successive leaderships to include opposition to immigration, Islam, and the European Union. Since 2015, with the beginning of the refugee crisis in Europe, AfD's ideology has been characterised by German nationalism, völkisch nationalism (ethno-nationalism), right-wing populism, and national conservatism. It has a policy focus on opposing Islam, opposing immigration into Germany, especially Muslim immigration into Germany, welfare chauvinism, Euroscepticism, denial of human-caused global warming, and supporting closer relations with Russia.

Several state associations and other factions of AfD have been linked to or accused of harbouring connections with far-right nationalist and proscribed movements, such as Pegida, the Neue Rechte, and the Identitarian movement, and of employing historical revisionism, as well as xenophobic rhetoric. They have been observed by various state offices for the protection of the constitution since 2018. AfD's leadership has denied that the party is racist and has been internally divided on whether to endorse such groups. In January 2022, after a failed power struggle, party leader Jörg Meuthen resigned his party chairmanship with immediate effect and left AfD, stating that the party had moved far to the right with totalitarian traits and in large parts was no longer based on Germany's liberal democratic basic order. Lucke had left the party in 2015 with a similar view. In 2023, the Young Alternative for Germany was officially categorized by the Federal Office for the Protection of the Constitution (BfV) as a confirmed extremist organisation. In 2025, the BfV officially classified AfD as a "confirmed right-wing extremist endeavor", which allows authorities to increase surveillance, and permits the use of informants and monitoring of communications, though this classification was suspended following a 2026 court injunction.

AfD is strongest in the areas of the former communist German Democratic Republic (East Germany), largely due to economic and integration issues that continue to persist post-reunification, in addition to the East German voters' apparent propensity for strongman rule.

== History ==
=== Background ===
In September 2012, Alexander Gauland, Bernd Lucke, and the journalist Konrad Adam founded the political group Electoral Alternative 2013 (German: Wahlalternative 2013) in Bad Nauheim, to oppose German federal policies concerning the eurozone crisis, and to confront German-supported bailouts for poorer southern European countries. Their manifesto was endorsed by several economists, journalists, and business leaders, and stated that the eurozone had proven to be "unsuitable" as a currency area and that southern European states were "sinking into poverty under the competitive pressure of the euro".

Some candidates of what would become AfD sought election in Lower Saxony as part of the Electoral Alternative 2013 in alliance with the Free Voters, an association participating in local elections without specific federal or foreign policies, and received 1% of the vote. In February 2013, the group decided to found a new party to compete in the 2013 federal election; according to a leaked email from Lucke, the Free Voters leadership declined to join forces.

=== Founding ===
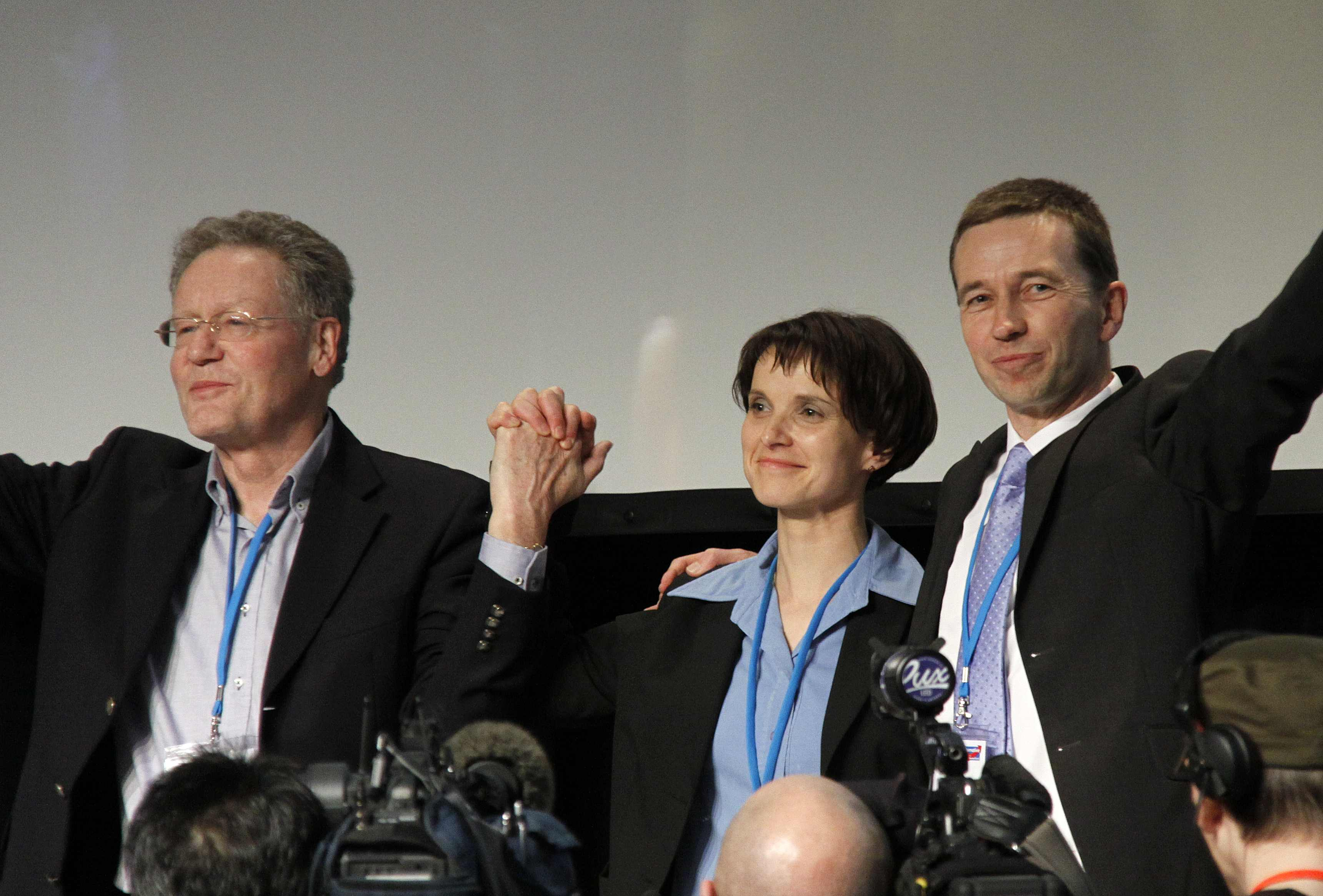
Konrad Adam (left), Frauke Petry, and Bernd Lucke during the first AfD convention on 14 April 2013 in Berlin

The party was founded on 6 February 2013. On 14 April 2013, the AfD announced its presence to the wider public when it held its first convention in Berlin, elected the party leadership, and adopted a party platform. Bernd Lucke, the entrepreneur Frauke Petry and Konrad Adam were elected as speakers. AfD's federal board also chose Alexander Gauland, Roland Klaus, and Patricia Casale as its three deputy speakers. The party elected the treasurer Norbert Stenzel and the three assessors Irina Smirnova, Beatrix Diefenbach, and Wolf-Joachim Schünemann. The economist Joachim Starbatty, along with Jörn Kruse, Helga Luckenbach, Dirk Meyer, and Roland Vaubel, were elected to the party's scientific advisory board. Between 31 March and 12 May 2013 AfD founded affiliates in all 16 states of Germany in order to participate in the federal elections. On 15 June 2013 the Young Alternative for Germany was founded in Darmstadt as the AfD's youth organisation. During the British prime minister David Cameron's visit to Germany in April 2013, the British Conservative Party was reported to have contacted both AfD and the Free Voters to discuss possible cooperation, supported by the European Conservatives and Reformists (ECR) group of the European Parliament. In June 2013 Bernd Lucke gave a question and answer session organized by the Conservative Party-allied Bruges Group think tank in Portcullis House, London. In a detailed report in the conservative Frankfurter Allgemeine Zeitung in April 2013, the paper's Berlin-based political correspondent Majid Sattar revealed that the Social Democratic Party of Germany (SPD) and CDU had conducted opposition research to blunt the growth and attraction of AfD.

Advocating the abolition of the euro, AfD took a more radical stance than the Free Voters. The Pirate Party Germany opposed any coalition with AfD at their 2013 spring convention. The AfD's initial supporters were the same prominent economists, business leaders, and journalists who had supported the Electoral Alternative 2013, including former members of the Christian Democratic Union of Germany (CDU), who had previously challenged the constitutionality of the German government's eurozone policies at the Federal Constitutional Court. AfD did not regard itself as a splinter party from the CDU, as its early membership also contained a former state leader from the Free Democratic Party and members of the Federation of Independent Voters, a pressure group of independents and small business owners.

=== Lucke's leadership (2013–2015) ===
Second vote share percentage for AfD in the 2013 federal election in Germany, final results

On 22 September 2013 AfD won 4.7% of the votes in the 2013 federal election, just missing the 5% barrier to enter the Bundestag. The party won about 2 million party list votes and 810,000 constituency votes, which was 1.9% of the total of these votes cast across Germany.

AfD did not participate in the 2013 Bavaria state election held on 15 September. The party gained parliamentary representation for the first time in the state parliament of Hesse, with the defection of Jochen Paulus from the Free Democratic Party to AfD in early May 2013; he was not re-elected and left office in January 2014. In the 2013 Hesse state election held on 22 September, the same day as the 2013 federal election, AfD failed to gain representation with just 4% of the vote.

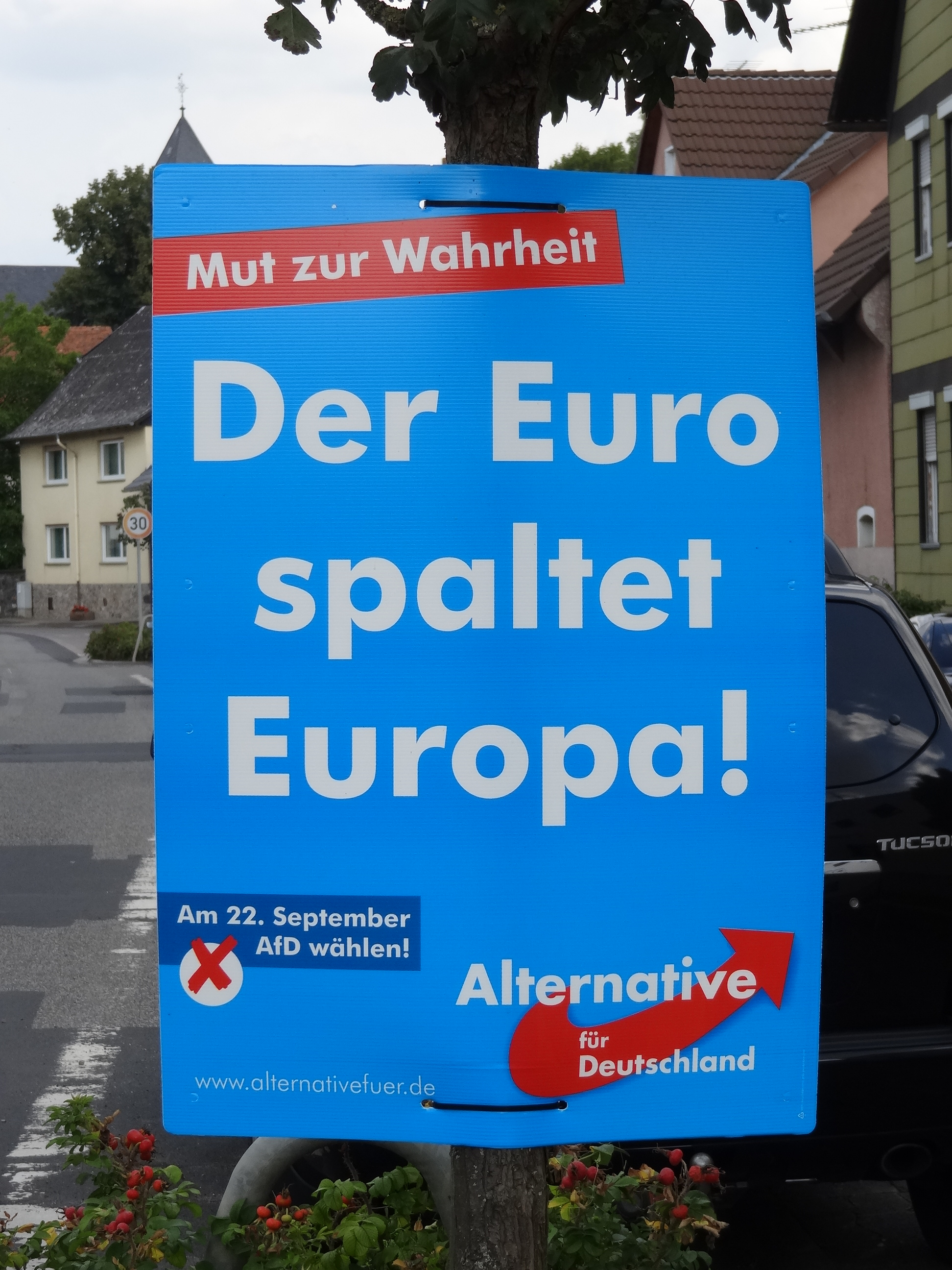
Former "Courage [to stand up] for the truth! The euro is dividing Europe!" tagline on election placard 2013

In early 2014, the Federal Constitutional Court of Germany ruled the proposed 3% vote hurdle for representation in the European elections unconstitutional, and the 2014 European Parliament election became the first run in Germany without a barrier for representation.

AfD held a party conference on 25 January 2014 in Aschaffenburg, northwest Bavaria. The conference chose the slogan Mut zu Deutschland ("Courage [to stand up] for Germany") to replace the former slogan Mut zur Wahrheit (lit. 'Courage [to speak] the truth', or more succinctly, "Telling it as it is"), which prompted disagreement among the federal board that the party could be seen as too anti-European. A compromise was reached by using the slogan "MUT ZU D*EU*TSCHLAND", with the "EU" in "DEUTSCHLAND" encircled by the 12 stars of the European flag. The conference elected the top six candidates for the European elections on 26 January 2014 and met again the following weekend to choose the remaining euro candidates. Candidates from 7th–28th place on the party list were selected in Berlin on 1 February. Party chairman Bernd Lucke was elected as lead candidate.

In February 2014, AfD officials said they had discussed alliances with the British anti-EU UK Independence Party (UKIP), which Lucke and the federal board of AfD opposed, and also with the European Conservatives and Reformists (ECR) group, to which Britain's Conservative Party belongs. In April 2014 Hans-Olaf Henkel, AfD's second candidate on the European election list, ruled out forming a group with UKIP. stating that he saw the Conservatives as the preferred partner in the European Parliament. On 10 May 2014 Lucke had been in talks with the Czech and Polish member parties of the ECR group.

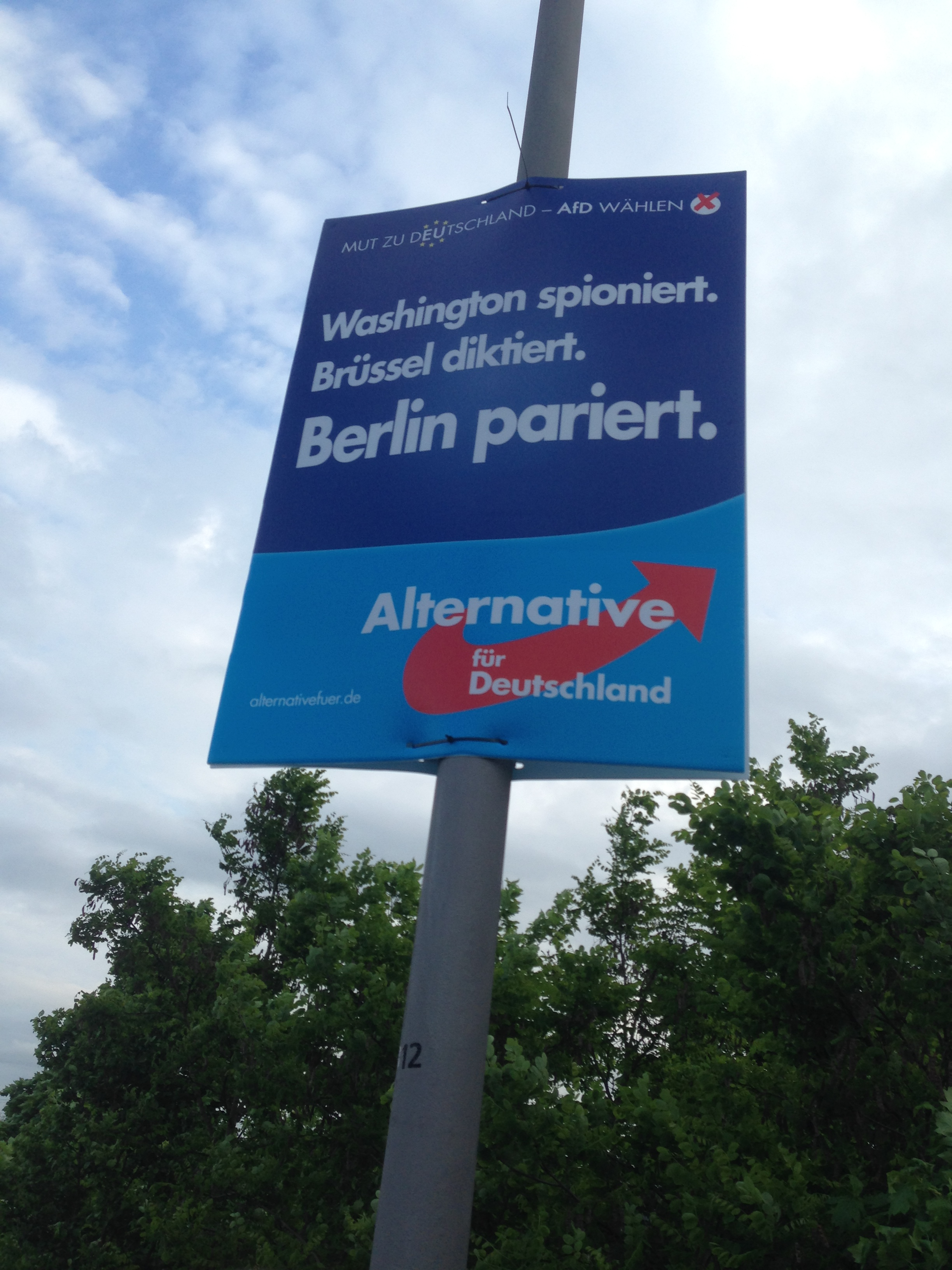
AfD election poster from 2014. The slogan translates as "Washington spies. Brussels dictates. Berlin obeys."

In the 2014 European Parliament election on 25 May, AfD came in fifth place in Germany, with 7.1% of the national vote (2,065,162 votes), and seven Members of the European parliament (MEPs). On 12 June 2014, it was announced that AfD had been accepted into the ECR group in the European Parliament. The official vote result was not released to the public, but figures of 29 votes for and 26 against were reported by the membership. The inclusion of AfD in the ECR group was said to have caused mild tensions between the German chancellor Angela Merkel and the British prime minister David Cameron.

On 31 August AfD received 9.7% of the vote in the 2014 Saxony state election, winning 14 seats in the Landtag of Saxony. On 14 September, AfD obtained 10.6% of the vote in the 2014 Thuringian and 12.2% in the Brandenburg state election, winning 11 seats in both state parliaments.

On 15 February 2015 AfD won 6.1% of the vote in the Hamburg state election, gaining the mandate for eight seats in the Hamburg Parliament, winning their first seats in a western German state. On 10 May 2015, AfD secured in the 5.5% of the vote in the 2015 Bremen state election gaining representation in their fifth state parliament on a 50% turnout.

=== Petry's leadership (2015–2017) ===
After months of factional infighting and a cancelled party gathering in June 2015, Frauke Petry was elected on 4 July 2015 as the de facto principal speaker of the party with 60% of the member votes ahead of Bernd Lucke at a party congress in Essen. Petry was a member of the national-conservative faction of AfD. Her leadership was widely seen as heralding a shift of the party to the right to focus more on issues such as immigration, Islam, and strengthening ties to Russia, a shift which was claimed by Lucke as turning the party into a "Pegida party". In the following week, five MEPs exited the party on 7 July, the only remaining MEPs being Beatrix von Storch and Marcus Pretzell, and Lucke announced on 8 July 2015 that he was resigning from AfD, citing the rise of xenophobic and pro-Russian sentiments in the party. At a meeting of members of the Wake-up call (Weckruf 2015) group on 19 July 2015, AfD founder Bernd Lucke and former AfD members announced they would form a new party, the Alliance for Progress and Renewal, under the founding principles of AfD. The split off party was eventually renamed the Liberal Conservative Reformers, but had little electoral success.

In February 2016 AfD announced a cooperation pact with the Freedom Party of Austria (FPÖ). On 8 March 2016, the bureau of the ECR group began motions to exclude AfD from their group due to its links with the far-right FPÖ, inviting the two remaining AfD MEPs to leave the group by 31 March, with a motion of exclusion to be tabled on 12 April if they refuse to leave voluntarily. While von Storch left the ECR group on 8 April to join the Europe of Freedom and Direct Democracy group, Pretzell let himself be expelled on 12 April.

With the European migrant crisis remaining the dominant national issue, elections on 13 March were held in the three states of Baden-Württemberg, Rhineland-Palatinate, and Saxony-Anhalt, and saw the AfD receiving double-digit percentages of the vote in all three states. In the 2016 Saxony-Anhalt state election, AfD reached second place in the Landtag, receiving 24.2% of the vote. In the 2016 Baden-Württemberg state election, AfD achieved third place, with 15.1% of the vote. In the 2016 Rhineland-Palatinate state election, AfD again reached third place, with 12.6% of the vote. In Angela Merkel's home state of Mecklenburg-Vorpommern, her CDU was beaten into third place following a strong showing of AfD, who contested at state level for the first time, to claim the second-highest polling with 20.8% of the vote in the 2016 state election. AfD voter support in Mecklenburg-Western Pomerania appears to have come from both left-wing and right-wing parties, with support for the Social Democratic Party of Germany down 4.9%, CDU down 4.1%, The Left down 5.2%, Alliance '90/The Greens down 3.9%, and support for the National Democratic Party of Germany (NDP) halved, dropping to 3.0%. Rising support for AfD meant that The Greens and the NDP failed to reach the 5% threshold to qualify for seats in the Landtag of Mecklenburg-Vorpommern, and consequently lost their seats. In the 2016 Berlin state election, which AfD also contested for the first time, the party achieved a vote of 14.2%, making them the fifth largest party represented in the state assembly. Their vote seems to have come equally from the SPD and CDU, whose votes declined 6.7% and 5.7%, respectively.

At the party congress held on 30 April to 1 May 2016, AfD adopted a policy platform based upon opposition to Islam, calling for the ban of Islamic symbols including burqas, minarets, and adhan (call to prayer), using the slogan "Islam is not a part of Germany".

=== Meuthen's leadership (2017–2022) ===
Second vote share percentage for AfD in the 2017 federal election in Germany, final results

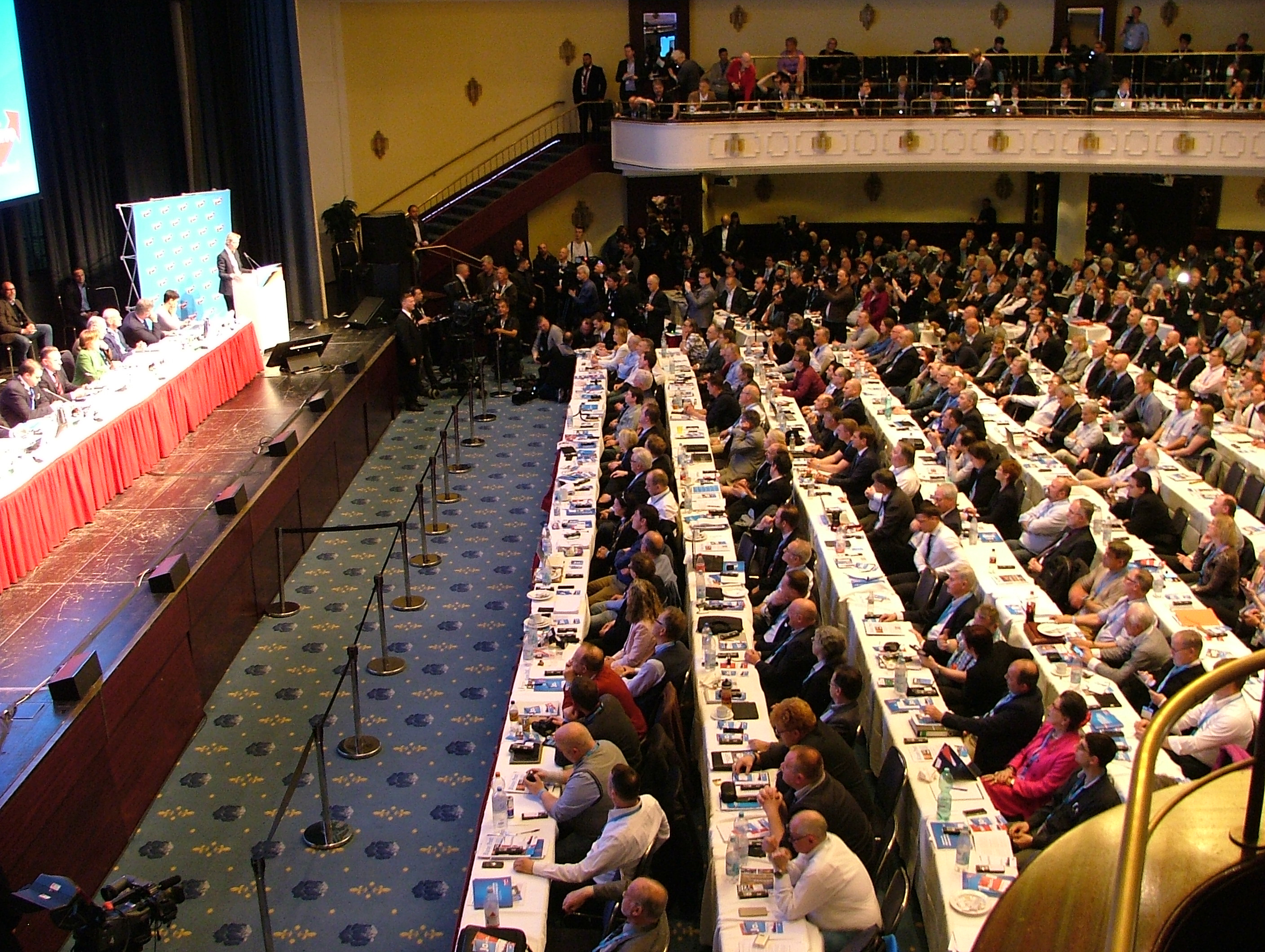
National party convention in Cologne in April 2017

At the party conference in April 2017, Frauke Petry announced that she would not run as the party's main candidate for the 2017 federal election. This announcement grew out of internal power struggle as the party's support had fallen in polls from 15% in the summer of 2016 to 7% just before the conference. Björn Höcke from the far-right wing of the party and Petry were attempting to push each other out of the party. Petry's decision was partly seen as a step to avoid a vote at the conference on the issue of her standing. The party chose Alexander Gauland, a stark conservative who worked as an editor and was a former member of the CDU, to lead the party in the elections. Gauland supported the retention of Höcke's party membership. Alice Weidel, who is perceived as more moderate and neoliberal, was elected as his running mate. The party approved a platform that, according to The Wall Street Journal, "urges Germany to close its borders to asylum applicants, end sanctions on Russia and to leave the EU if Berlin fails to retrieve national sovereignty from Brussels, as well as to amend the country's constitution to allow people born to non-German parents to have their German citizenship revoked if they commit serious crimes."

In the 2017 federal election AfD won 12.6% of the vote and received 94 seats; this was the first time it had won seats in the Bundestag. It won three constituency seats, which would have been enough to qualify for proportionally-elected seats in any event. Under a long-standing law intended to benefit regional parties, any party that wins at least three constituency seats qualifies for its share of proportionally-elected seats, regardless of vote share.

At a press conference held by AfD the day after the 2017 federal election, Frauke Petry said that she would participate in the Bundestag as an independent; she said she did this because extremist statements by some members made it impossible for AfD to function as a constructive opposition, and to make clear to voters that there is internal dissent in the AfD. She also said that she would be leaving the party at some future date. Petry formed the Blue Party in September 2017. Four members of AfD in the Mecklenburg-Western Pomerania legislature, including Bernhard Wild, also left the party to form Citizens for Mecklenburg-Vorpommern, which folded in December 2018. On 6 November 2019 Petry announced that the Blue Party would dissolve by the end of the year.

In 2018 André Poggenburg, AfD's regional leader of the eastern Saxony-Anhalt state, resigned his post after making racist remarks concerning Turks and immigrants with dual citizenship. In 2019, Poggenburg started a new far-right party, Aufbruch deutscher Patrioten – Mitteldeutschland (ADPM), which he left in August 2019 after his internal call to dissolve ADPM and to support AfD in the upcoming state elections of fall 2019 was denied.

Ahead of the 2021 federal election, AfD campaigned with the slogan "Germany. But Normal" and took a position of opposing further lockdowns in response to the COVID-19 pandemic in Germany. Having moved further right on economic issues and remaining strongly right on socio-cultural issues, despite attempts to normalize, AfD's manifesto for the federal election was deemed to be still too radical for the party to take part in government.

In the federal election, AfD saw a dip in national vote share by getting 10.3% of the vote, compared to 12.6% in 2017; however, the party emerged as the largest in the states of Saxony and Thuringia, and saw a strong performance in eastern Germany. The party's results drew a mixed analysis from AfD members and political commentators, the latter of whom attributed the slight decline to visible infighting, whereas AfD candidates such as Alice Weidel blamed media bias against the party. The political scientist Kai Arzheimer commented that the result "wasn't any appreciable increase, but it wasn't a disaster for them." Arzheimer also posited that the result demonstrated that AfD had firmly established itself in German national politics but had not reached beyond its core support. AfD's top candidates Tino Chrupalla and Weidel praised the result as "solid", while party spokesman Jörg Meuthen stated that the party should reevaluate the result and aim on "sending strong signals towards the center" to win back new voters. Meuthen left the party in January 2022.

=== Chrupalla and Weidel (2022–present) ===
AfD held their three seats in the 2022 Saarland state election. At the same time, they lost all their seats in the 2022 Schleswig-Holstein state election. In the 2022 Lower Saxony state election in October, AfD won nine more seats compared to 2017 to a total of 18. In the 2023 Berlin repeat state election AfD recorded a small upswing by gaining four seats compared to the 2021 election. In the 2023 Bremen state election AfD did not participate and lost all their seats, as the Bremen electoral committee had barred AfD from the election due to internal divisions that had resulted in them submitting two lists of candidates. The Citizens in Rage, another right-wing party, participated instead; they received 10 seats (after having only one seat in 2019) in Bremen's state parliament. On 25 June 2023, amidst rises in polls, Thuringia's AfD won its first district election in Sonneberg. In the run-off election held on 2 July, the AfD candidate Hannes Loth won against the independent politician Nils Naumann, becoming AfD's first ever mayor.

On 8 October state elections, AfD significantly increased its share in Hesse where it became the second-biggest party (+9 seats) and in Bavaria, where it became the third (+10 seats).

Observers considered the increase of support for the AfD as not being limited to the local level. Opinion polling for the 2025 German federal election conducted in early July 2023 showed that the AfD polled more than the SPD, achieving second place behind the CDU/CSU alliance. The SPD co-leader said a ban should be considered if the AfD is categorized as a group of "proven Right-wing extremists" by the Federal Office for the Protection of the Constitution. Friedrich Merz, the CDU leader, warned that "banning parties has never actually solved political problems". Germans are evenly split on a ban, with 47 per cent in favour and 47 per cent against; the ban is more popular in the west and among liberal Greens.

In December 2023 Tim Lochner of AfD was elected mayor of Pirna (Saxony). He became the first mayor of a city with more than 20,000 inhabitants to be a member of the party.

In 2023, the AfD saw 86 violent attacks against AfD representatives — the most of any German party.

==== 2023 meeting and subsequent protests ====
In January 2024 Correctiv reported that members of AfD had secretly met with figures from the German and Austrian far-right in November 2023, in which they allegedly discussed a "remigration" plan for deporting immigrants, which could include naturalised German citizens. Those present included the Identitarian activist Martin Sellner.

The AfD distanced itself from the meeting, saying it was not responsible for what was discussed and that its members had attended only in a personal capacity. Alice Weidel parted ways with Roland Hartwig, an advisor who was present at the meeting.

The plan was condemned by German politicians, including chancellor Olaf Scholz. The report sparked protests against the AfD across Germany, with protestors calling for a ban of AfD. Subsequently, the AfD member Maximilian Krah got involved in controversy, prompting AfD to be expelled from the ID group, with EKRE supporting expulsion of Krah, but opposing the removal of the entire AfD delegation, and the FPÖ opposing the expulsion of AfD.

==== 2024 ====
AfD in the 2024 European Parliament election in Germany

On 9 June 2024 AfD won 16% of the vote in the European Parliament elections, second only to the CDU/CSU and almost five percentage points more than in the 2019 election. AfD prevailed in all five former East German states.

One of the party's leaders, Tino Chrupalla, hailed the results as "historic". In an attempt to rejoin the ID group, the AfD replaced its controversial candidate Maximilian Krah with René Aust as head of the AfD delegation in the European Parliament. However, AfD failed to join ID, or now named Patriots for Europe. Instead, AfD formed the new ESN group which was composed predominantly of AfD members, as well as some other ethnonationalist parties across Europe.

==== State elections in the former East German states ====
In the 2024 Thuringian state election, the AfD became the first far-right party in Germany since the Nazi Party to win a plurality of seats in a state election. The AfD also performed strongly in Brandenburg and Saxony.

==== 2025 ====
Seating chart of the results

On 23 February 2025 AfD won 20.8% of the vote in the German federal election, second to the CDU/CSU, and won 152 of 630 seats. It gained 10.4 percentage points over the 2021 election result. The party won nearly a third of the votes in each of the East German states, the lowest being 32.5% in Brandenburg and the highest 38.5% in Thuringia, and won all but three constituency seats in the former East Germany (Potsdam, Erfurt and one of two seats in Leipzig). In the former West Germany, the party beat the SPD for second place by less than 0.5% of the vote and received more than 20% of the vote in two southwestern states: Saarland (21.6%) and Rhineland-Palatinate (20.1%).

In April 2025, for the first time in German history, AfD was ahead of the CDU/CSU (Union) in some opinion polls for the next federal election, while other polls put it on par with the Union or in second place. Support for the CDU/CSU, an alliance that won the election, fell from 29% to 24%, while AfD rose by three percentage points from 22% to 25%, partially becoming the most popular party in Germany.

On 2 May 2025 the Federal Office for the Protection of the Constitution (BfV) classified AfD as a "confirmed right-wing extremist endeavor". In a 1,100-page classified and undisclosed report, BfV experts found that AfD is a "racist and anti-Muslim organisation". The classification will allow German authorities to monitor AfD and possibly limit or halt public funding for it. It may also inspire its opponents to attempt to get it banned. AfD leaders Alice Weidel and Tino Chrupalla said the decision was "clearly politically motivated" and was a "severe blow to German democracy". They argued that AfD is being discredited and persecuted by the government. Chancellor Olaf Scholz said that BfV provided a "very detailed justification" for its decision and that proceedings to ban the AfD must not be rushed. Several federal states in Germany have begun considering measures that would ban AfD members from being employed in jobs like civil servants, police officers, teachers or soldiers in response to the classification.

On 4 May 2025 a poll conducted by Insa Polling Institute which surveyed 1,001 people found that 48% of them favour banning AfD. The poll also showed that 61% of participants considered AfD a "right-wing extremist" party. On 5 May AfD sued the BfV, accusing it of violating the Basic Law for the Federal Republic of Germany (the German constitution) by trying to prosecute AfD for expressing ideas which are considered freedom of speech and legitimate criticism of German immigration policies. A court in Cologne will start reviewing the case once BfV confirms that it has been notified of the lawsuit.

Sieghard Knodel, a member of AfD in the Bundestag, announced his resignation from the party on 6 May 2025. He wrote in an email: "In light of the classification of the party as confirmed right-wing extremist by the Federal Office for the Protection of the Constitution, I must protect my private and business environment". He said that he would continue to serve as a non-attached member of parliament.

On May 8, the extremist classification of AfD was temporarily suspended by the BfV pending an official court judgement. The AfD's leaders said that the decision was a "first important step" that would help "counter the accusation of right-wing extremism". The report by the BfV that led to the classification was later leaked to the public.

For the Ludwigshafen mayoral election in September 2025, the local election administration commission composed of members of other parties decided that AfD candidate Joachim Paul would not appear on the ballot due to doubts regarding his support for the Basic Law. This move was later upheld in court, despite Paul never having had his right to be a candidate in elections revoked by law or any court. In August, five direct and two reserve AfD candidates died within 14 days of each other ahead of local elections in North Rhine-Westphalia.

==== 2026 ====
In 2026, the AfD received its best ever result in a state election, winning 43.8% of the vote in the 2026 Saxony-Anhalt state election. The party barely missed out on an absolute majority, winning 39 seats while 42 were required for a majority.

== Ideology and platform ==
AfD is broadly considered to be a right-wing and national-conservative movement in both socioeconomic and sociocultural terms. AfD's policy brief and mission statement seeks to define the party as both liberal and conservative, with an emphasis on protecting sovereignty, Western identity, and German culture in what it calls a "peaceful, democratic and sovereign nation-state of the German people." Political scientists and journalists have also described AfD as synonymous with opposition to immigration, Euroscepticism, and holding a nationalist bent, with various shades of German nationalism from civic nationalism to hardline sentiments visible in the party. Other commentators have categorized it as a radical right populist party or as "a typical radical right-wing populist party", with an emphasis on nativism. Within its elected representation and grassroots membership, AfD has grown to contain interparty factions that range from more moderate conservatives to radicals. Beginning in the 2020s, several positions of AfD's agenda have increasingly been described as illiberal. According to the journalist Oliver Das Gupta, the party's goal is a Germany based on Viktor Orbán's model of an "illiberal democracy". In 2026, the historian Heinrich August Winkler described AfD as "deeply illiberal, nationalistic, and anti-European".

AfD was initially founded as a liberal conservative party of the middle class, with a tendency towards soft Euroscepticism, being supportive of Germany's membership in the European Union but critical of further European integration, the euro, and the bailouts by the eurozone for countries such as Greece. At that time, the party also advocated support for Swiss-style semi-direct democracy, major reforms to the eurozone, opposition to immigration, and opposed same-sex marriage. During this period, the party espoused economic liberal, ordoliberal, and national liberal policy stances. Former party MEP Hans-Olaf Henkel likened AfD's early platform to the Conservative Party in Britain rather than hard Eurosceptic or nationalist parties such as the UK Independence Party or the National Front in France. AfD was compared to the Tea Party movement by some media outlets due to its campaigns against eurozone bailouts, although AfD's early leadership disputed this and said it was not looking to attract right-wing extremists into the party.

In 2015 more moderate members, including its founder and former chairman Bernd Lucke, left AfD after Frauke Petry was elected chairperson to found a new party, the Alliance for Progress and Renewal, which was renamed the Liberal Conservative Reformers in November 2016. Lucke cited the AfD's "anti-western, decidedly pro-Russian foreign and security policy orientation" and increasing calls to "pose the 'system question' with regard to our parliamentary democracy" as reasons for his departure. At that time, AfD was performing poorly in opinion polls, polling at around 3%, and was suffering infighting; however, an influx of refugees and migrants boosted their support later in 2015, with the party turning from matters related to the eurozone to focus on opposing migration, in particular Muslims and Muslim immigration.

AfD underwent a further shift to the right after Petry left the party in 2017 and formed the Blue Party, following AfD's adoption of more hardline Islamophobic, anti-immigration positions, and historical revisionist remarks by leading AfD figures. The party resembled other populist radical right parties in Europe but was somewhat unusual in its choice to maintain visible ties to even more extreme groups. The party has been described as more ideologically radical than many other European far-right and right-wing populist parties, including the Sweden Democrats, the Danish People's Party, and the Freedom Party of Austria. Such extreme positions have led many far-right parties to distance themselves from AfD. AfD has been described as, and accused of, containing members sympathetic to the Identitarian movement and Pegida. The AfD leadership has been split on whether to embrace these movements within the party.

In March 2020 the Federal Office for the Protection of the Constitution (German: Bundesamt für Verfassungsschutz) classified AfD's far-right nationalistic faction known as Der Flügel (The Wing) as "a right-wing extremist endeavor against the free democratic basic order" and as "not compatible with the Basic Law", placing it under government surveillance. In early March 2021 most of Germany's major media outlets reported that the Bundesverfassungsschutz had placed the whole AfD under surveillance as a "suspected extremist group". In response to claims from AfD members that the move was intended to damage the party's chances in the 2021 German federal election, the agency stated it would not make public announcements regarding investigations into AfD or its candidates for the foreseeable future. After the revelations, the surveillance was blocked by the courts to give equal opportunities among political parties in a key election year.

In 2022 it was ruled that the BfV may classify and monitor the entire party as a suspected right-wing extremist group. A corresponding lawsuit by AfD was dismissed because "there were sufficient factual indications of anti-constitutional efforts within the AfD". The dismissal was upheld in May 2024. On 26 April 2023 the BfV, after four years of investigations into the Young Alternative for Germany, categorized that group as a confirmed extremist organisation. In 2025, the BfV officially classified AfD as a "confirmed right-wing extremist endeavor". which allows authorities to increase surveillance, and permits the use of informants and monitoring of communications. The expertise by the BfV which led to that classification was later leaked to the public.

AfD is anti-communist and engaged in red-baiting by comparing Angela Merkel and her government to the secret police in East Germany. The AfD has shifted the German political discourse toward the right and initiated culture wars centered around topics such as LGBTQ, gender identity, and the content of programs on public broadcasters. The party's rhetoric has normalized extremism, played down its own scandals, and contributed to the stigmatisation of societal activities with positive connotations, such as standing up for minorities or donating for charity. AfD has engaged in scapegoating by collectively attributing societal issues relating to housing, welfare, security, education, and crime to migration, culture, and identity. It has fueled xenophobia by disproportionately focusing on crimes suspected to have been committed by foreigners while ignoring others. The party has developed and uses an AI-based software called Alternita that helps its members to generate rage-baiting posts on social media platforms, which the magazine Tagesspiegel has described as a "propaganda AI". A 2026 study found that AfD has become an integral part of a global network of far-right and authoritarian parties, figures, and movements that support one another. The party aims to replace the established Culture of Remembrance (Erinnerungskultur) in Germany by reorienting it toward a nationalist and revisionist view of the country's past, referring to it as Schuldkult.

=== Ideological factions ===
Political commentators and analysts have described the party as containing two prominent factions: subscribers to the more dovish and moderate national-conservative Alternative Mitte (Alternative Center) wing, such as the parliamentarians Jörg Meuthen, Alice Weidel, and Beatrix von Storch, who oppose collaboration with movements or figures like the Pegida founder Lutz Bachmann; and the more hardline identitarian or völkisch nationalist Der Flügel faction, comprising figures at state level such as Thuringia state leader Björn Höcke. Some academics have described additional factions representing economic liberals or the Christian right. The political author Jeffrey Gedmin has described the present incarnation of AfD as somewhat lacking in a consistent ideological vision and containing a broad church of members who are conservatives, social conservatives, radical-rightists, and others who do not present clear ideological narrative. He also described some of its core voter support as ranging from far-right nationalists to moderate but traditionalist and disaffected conservatives.

=== German nationalism ===
Over time a focus on German nationalism, on reclaiming Germany's sovereignty and national pride, especially in repudiation of Germany's culture of shame with regard to its Nazi past, became more central in AfD's ideology and a central plank in its populist appeals. Petry, who led the moderate wing of the party, said that Germany should reclaim völkisch from its Nazi connotations, while the more right-wing Björn Höcke regularly speaks of the Vaterland ("fatherland") and Volk ("nation" or "people", but with a strong ethnic or racial connotation).

In January 2017 Höcke in a speech stated, in reference to the Berlin Holocaust Memorial, that "Germans are the only people in the world who plant a monument of shame in the heart of the capital" and criticised this "laughable policy of coming to terms with the past". Höcke continued that Germany should make a "180 degree" turn with regard to its sense of national pride.

==== Accusations of antisemitism ====
Some AfD members and candidates have expressed antisemitic attitudes. AfD leaders have repeatedly denied accusations of antisemitism. According to a study conducted by the Forsa Institute in 2019, while 2% of the German population agreed with the statement that "the Holocaust is propaganda of the Allied Powers", that proportion was 15% among AfD supporters. In 2001, 12 years before the founding of AfD, the former AfD Bundestag member Wilhelm von Gottberg expressed his views on the remembrance of the Holocaust by quoting the Italian neofascist Mario Consoli in saying "Any pretext, no matter how flimsy [...], is good enough to remind people of the Holocaust. The propaganda steamroller is getting stronger rather than weaker over the years, and in more and more countries the Jewish 'truth' about the Holocaust is being given legal protection. The Holocaust must remain a myth, a dogma that is beyond the reach of any free historical research."

In 2017, ten AfD Bundestag members were found to have participated in a closed Facebook group named "the Patriots" in which, among other things, antisemitic, racist, pro-Nazi and conspiratorial posts were widespread. One meme posted therein, which showed the Holocaust victim Anne Frank's face edited on a pizza box labelled with the German equivalent of "fresh from the oven", gained particular media attention. While some AfD officials stated that they had been unknowingly added to the Facebook group without consent and that they had now left it, the Bundestag member Stephan Protschka remained, saying: "I am a member of this group because I also see myself as a patriot."

According to a 2019 report by the Federal Office for the Protection of the Constitution, statements by leading AfD representatives such as Alexander Gauland and Björn Höcke, who exonerate Holocaust perpetrators and discredit the reappraisal of the Nazi era as "anti-German", create a "connectivity" to right-wing extremist historical revisionism and could "ultimately lead to denial of war guilt and The Holocaust". In 2023 Felix Klein, the Federal Government Commissioner for Jewish Life in Germany and the Fight against antisemitism, stated that leading forces within AfD relativize the Holocaust and that the party condones antisemitism.

Josef Schuster, President of the Central Council of Jews in Germany, stated in 2024 that he is "concerned that the AfD would deliberately act against Jewish life, if it fits into their concept", and that the party offers antisemites a home. A study commissioned by the American Jewish Committee in 2021 came to the conclusion that antisemitism belongs to the "programmatic core" of the AfD. According to the study, the party conducts "targeted campaigns" against Jewish celebrities. The study's author, Lars Rensmann, stated that "despite some lip service to the contrary, hostility towards Israel, Holocaust relativization, antisemitic conspiracy thinking and anti-Jewish images occupy a prominent place" in AfD.

AfD supports a ban on kosher slaughter within the country, as well as the "import and sale of kosher meat". AfD instead wants to require the stunning of animals before slaughter which is against both Jewish and Muslim religious law that both require animals to be conscious when their necks are cut.

==== Immigration, multiculturalism and Islam ====
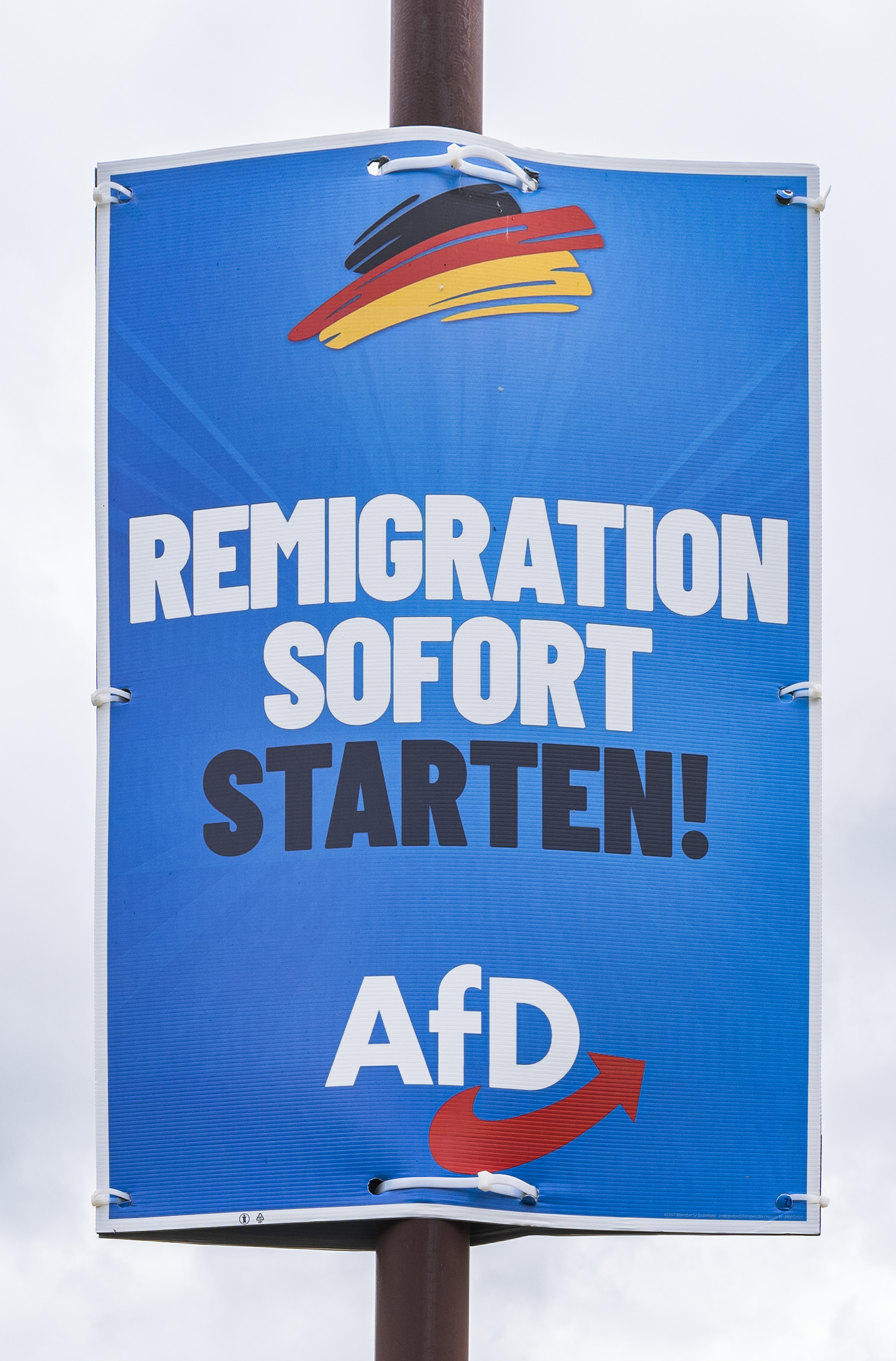
Election poster of the AfD in Thuringia supporting remigration (2024)

AfD describes German national identity as under threat both from European integration and from the presence and accommodation of immigrants and refugees within Germany. Former leader Petry said in March 2016: "I'm not against immigration, but ... the economic and social consequences of migration on both home and host countries are equally momentous .... The immigration of so many Muslims will change our culture. If this change is desired, it must be the product of a democratic decision supported by a broad majority. But Ms. Merkel simply opened the borders and invited everybody in, without consulting the parliament or the people."

In its programme, AfD wants to end what it describes as mass immigration and focus on taking in small numbers of skilled immigrants who are expected to integrate into society and speak German. It encourages German nationals to have more children, as opposed to trying to boost the German population through foreign migration. The party wants to review EU freedom of movement rules and states that immigrants must be employed and contribute to social security through paying taxes for at least four years before being allowed to receive state benefits. AfD calls for mass deportations of foreign born criminals with multiple citizenship or permanent residency. The party describes the Geneva Convention on Refugees as "outdated", calls for stricter vetting of refugees, and believes the German government should invest in special economic and safe zones in third world nations as opposed to taking in large numbers of asylum seekers without background checks.

AfD is critical of multiculturalism in Germany. The party favours banning the burqa, the Islamic call to prayer in public areas and the construction of new minarets, ending foreign funding of mosques and putting imams through a state vetting procedure.

AfD began to employ anti-Muslim rhetoric during the leadership of Petry, who responded positively to comparisons between the party and Pegida. In 2016 the party adopted several anti-Muslim positions and stated in its manifesto that "Islam does not belong to Germany. Its expansion and the ever-increasing number of Muslims in the country are viewed by the AfD as a danger to our state, our society, and our values." The party has run a billboard campaign that explicitly referenced the far-right Eurabia conspiracy theory, and the party has been seen to have been strongly influenced by, and to be a part of the counter-jihad movement.

In January 2025 the Karlsruhe branch of the AfD initiated a controversial campaign by distributing flyers resembling flight tickets labeled "Abschiebetickets" ("deportation tickets") in mailboxes. These flyers included a QR code linking to AfD Karlsruhe's website and were intended as promotional material for the upcoming Bundestag elections. The action prompted investigations by the criminal police on suspicions of incitement to hatred (Volksverhetzung).

In January 2025, after a deadly knife attack perpetrated by an Afghan migrant, who had no residence permit, the CDU issued a motion regarding migration into the federal parliament, which attained a majority due to the AfD voting alongside the CDU. With this motion, CDU leader Friedrich Merz ignored his own proposal, uttered in November 2024, to only put questions to the vote that would find a majority without the AfD. The Bundestag went on to reject the CDU's proposed legislation a few days later, largely due to a dozen CDU legislators abstaining, a decision seen to be sparked by the AfD-related controversy.

=== Society ===
==== LGBT rights ====
AfD election posters. The poster on the left translates as "German language without gender neutrality"; that on the right as "Only the original".

According to its interim electoral manifesto, AfD opposes same-sex marriage and favours civil unions AfD deputy leader Beatrix von Storch has publicly opposed same-sex marriage. In an effort to overturn same-sex marriage laws, AfD filed a lawsuit over the issue in 2017.

In December 2023, AfD members in Lower Saxony distributed a flier in Gifhorn titled "Kindheit unterm Regenbogen" ("Childhood Under the Rainbow"), linking the queer community to pedophilia and genital mutilation, speaking of a "rainbow regime" and claiming that children are being taught to masturbate. They also denounced drag queen story hours, claiming that these "trans activists" "need" children, and that there are only two genders and no "social constructs."

Hans-Christoph Berndt, the AfD's lead candidate for the 2024 Brandenburg state election, announced that, if elected, he would ban the practice of displaying rainbow flags on public buildings in the state. The AfD parliamentary group of the Landtag of Lower Saxony also introduced a motion to ban rainbow flags from public buildings in 2024.

==== Circumcision ====
AfD supports a ban on circumcision for non-medical reasons for those under the age of majority, saying that the practice constituted "serious violations of fundamental rights".

==== Abortion ====
Alternative for Germany is an anti-abortion party. The AfD has described its position as "pro-life" and rejects any state support for abortion.

==== Feminism ====
The left-leaning newspaper Die Tageszeitung described the party as advocating "old gender roles". Wolfgang Gedeon, an elected AfD representative, has included feminism, along with "sexualism" and "migrationism", in an ideology he calls "green communism" that he opposes, and argues for family values as part of German identity. As AfD has campaigned for traditional roles for women, it has aligned itself with groups opposed to modern feminism. The youth wing of the party has used social media to campaign against aspects of modern feminism, with the support of party leadership.

=== Economy ===
AfD is an economically liberal party. Despite the 2015 split of economic liberals, AfD can still be broadly characterized as neoliberal on economic terms, emphasizing deregulation and much limited state intervention. Attempts by some party factions to emphasize small and medium-sized enterprises, and advocate protectionism over free trade, have not had much success.

=== Environment and climate ===
AfD has a platform of climate change denial. AfD accepts that the climate is changing, however, it denies that this change is attributable to human influences. Instead the party argues that climate change is entirely caused by natural factors. AfD argues that the rising carbon dioxide concentrations have been beneficial (contributed to a "greening" of Earth). Next to its climate change denial, AfD opposes far-reaching climate policies: The party opposes energy transformation policies (Energiewende), wants to scrap the German Renewable Energy Act, the German Energy Saving Regulations, and the German Renewable Energy Heat Act. They also want to end bioenergy subsidies and restrict "uncontrolled expansion of wind energy". The party rejects the European Green Deal and has warned against the deindustrialization of Europe.

==== Energy ====
The party argues that the energy transition threatens energy security, possibly leading to energy blackouts. It, therefore, views lignite as the only native energy source that can guarantee German energy security and energy self-sufficiency. Furthermore, AfD wants to reinstate Germany's nuclear plants, arguing that closures between 2002 and 2011 were "economically damaging and not objectively justified". The party argues that the government should "allow a lifetime extension of still operating nuclear power plants on a transitional basis". The party opposes amending the Rome Statute to make environmental destruction an international crime, with Gunnar Beck, an MEP for AfD, stating that "recognizing crimes against the environment as a violation of human rights and even war crimes is yet another grotesque inflation of the human rights doctrine."

=== Foreign policy ===
==== Defence ====
AfD wants a reinstatement of conscription in Germany, starting for able-bodied men at the age of 18.

==== Russia and the United States ====
While AfD had been pro-NATO and pro-United States during the first Trump administration, it had been sharply critical of the Biden administration. It was significantly divided on whether to support Russia, but has since moved to a pro-Russian direction, opposing sanctions on Russia supported by NATO and the United States and calling for an end to military aid to Ukraine. It is also divided on free-trade agreements. In March 2019, party leader Alexander Gauland said in an interview with the Russian newspaper Komsomolskaya Pravda that they consider the war in Donbas to be a Ukrainian internal matter, and that Germany should not get involved in the internal affairs of Ukraine or Russia. He also said AfD is against international sanctions on Russia. AfD members have called for a more independent stance from the United States. The party has also endorsed accusations that the United States was involved in the 2022 Nord Stream pipeline sabotage, although by 2026 after investigations they had called for compensation from Ukraine, despite historical denials of involvement by Ukrainian President Zelenskyy. AfD has also called NATO's anti-Russian stance overly ideological and detrimental to Germany's interests. A large number of AfD delegates boycotted Ukrainian President Volodymyr Zelenskyy in June 2024 when he gave a speech to the Bundestag. In February 2025, some high-ranking AfD members criticised Chrupalla's pro-Moscow position on foreign policy.

An Organized Crime and Corruption Reporting Project (OCCRP) investigation from February 2023 found evidence that AfD is a key ally for the International Agency for Current Policy, an organization established by Russian parliamentary staffer Sargis Mirzakhanian, whose internal documents describe it as a "closed association of professionals" engaged in a variety of pro-Russian activities. These include organizing street protests against NATO, bringing European delegations to Moscow and Crimea, and targeting "national parliaments of the EU" with resolutions to end EU sanctions on Russia and to grant recognition to Russia's annexation of Crimea. Internal emails, including some from Mirzakhanyan, document substantial payments to EU politicians made in exchange for pro-Kremlin motions in their home countries, and to Manuel Ochsenreiter for publishing pro-Russian propaganda in his Zuerst! magazine.

In August 2023 a journalist investigation was published by The Insider, describing how money was funnelled from Moscow to AfD politicians who initiated a constitutional complaint in Germany against the supplies of weapons for Ukraine. The AfD supported peace negotiations on the Russo-Ukrainian War with the participation of Russia.

In October 2025 Georg Maier, the Interior Minister of Thuringia, raised concerns that the AfD might be using parliamentary inquiries to obtain information on critical infrastructure on behalf of the Kremlin. This includes detailed requests on transport and digital infrastructure, as well as water and energy supply, military capabilities, weak points and logistics. These claims have been supported by other politicians such as Sonja Eichwede, deputy chair of the SPD parliamentary group, who called the AfD a "dangerous role in Putin's geopolitical power game", and Thomas Röwekamp, chair of the Defence Council of the Bundestag, who warned of "critical information about the Bundeswehr and the Federal Ministry of Defence being obtained." The AfD has dismissed these claims, with Björn Höcke, head of the AfD Thuringia, calling them "defamation" and Markus Frohnmaier, MdB for the AfD, accusing the other parties of creating a "staged outrage".

In March 2026, in the midst of the United States' war with Iran, AfD MP Stefan Möller stated in a meeting of Bundestag members that there were "two hearts in [AfD's] chest" about Donald Trump, as "On the one hand", Trump "is pursuing a political approach that is in line with [AfD's] on many issues, and which also acts as a kind of protective force against attacks on the AfD as an opposition party", but on the other, Trump "is taking this very aggressive geostrategic course in foreign policy, which is not in line with [AfD's] ideas".

==== European Union ====
AfD initially held a position of soft Euroscepticism by opposing the euro currency and eurozone bailouts, which the party saw as undermining European integration, but it was otherwise supportive of German membership of the European Union (EU).

Since 2015, the party has shifted to a more purely Eurosceptic and nationalist position against the EU, calling for the withdrawal from the common European asylum and security policy, significant reform of the EU and a repatriation of powers back from Brussels with some party members endorsing a complete exit from the European Union if these aims are not achievable.

During the 2021 party conference in Dresden, a majority of AfD members voted to include more hardline policies against the European Union including German withdrawal from the bloc in the party's manifesto ahead of the 2021 German federal election.

Starting in 2025, the AfD worked with Hungary's nationalist prime minister at the time, Viktor Orbán. Alice Weidel praised Hungary as a model for AfD, saying that AfD shared Hungary's opposition to illegal immigration and stance on the European Union. In February 2025 Weidel stated about AfD's policy towards the European Union: "We should work together to reform the European Union at all costs. And that can only be done from within. We can achieve this by reducing the competences of the European Union, by dismantling the entire bureaucratic, expensive—and, in my view, corrupt—superstructure."

==== Middle East ====
The party had previously been pro-Israel. AfD supported the decision of US president Donald Trump to recognize Jerusalem as Israel's capital, as stated by AfD's Petr Bystron. Despite AfD's pro-Israel stance, Israel has boycotted the party and has refused to hold ties with AfD. The party was divided over the Gaza war, with party leader Chrupalla condemning the October 7 attacks but calling for diplomacy and mourning deaths on both sides, while other MPs, such as Norbert Kleinwächter and Rüdiger Lucassen were critical of Chrupalla's position and openly defended Israel's conduct during the war. Following the October 7 attacks, the party supported cuts in German aid to Palestine via the UNRWA.

In 2024, AfD reversed its previously pro-Israel position, with co-leader Tino Chrupalla calling for an end to Germany's current relationship with Israel, which Chrupalla described as "one-sided", as well as an end to arms exports to Israel during the Gaza war. This decision drew criticism from some other members of the AfD parliamentary group, suggesting a continued internal divide on the issue. Chrupalla criticised the German government's support for Israel during the war and rejected "blanket" Islamophobia. Some AfD members referred to Israel's conduct as constituting genocide in Gaza. Nevertheless, in January 2025, the other co-leader, Alice Weidel, affirmed her support for Israel, but noted that she "didn't know how she would solve this conflict". Chrupalla and Weidel have been described as divided on the issue of Israel, with Weidel continuing to affirm German support for Israel's right to self-defence. At the start of the Twelve-Day War between Israel and Iran in June 2025, AfD foreign policy spokesperson Markus Frohnmaier expressed support for a diplomatic solution and called on both sides to cease hostilities, while insisting that Iran should not pursue a nuclear weapons programme.

Although the Israeli Foreign Ministry continues to hold no formal contact with AfD, Israeli Diaspora Affairs minister Amichai Chikli has praised several of AfD's policy stances and expressed support for Weidel, while criticising historical revisionist elements within the party, represented by Maximilian Krah and Björn Höcke.

In 2018 and 2019, AfD Bundestag members visited Ba'athist Syria, meeting with senior officials from the government of Bashar al-Assad and advocating for the return of Syrian refugees.

In 2026, in the midst of the 2026 Iran war, party leader Tino Chrupalla praised Spain's refusal to allow American forces to use its military bases for the conflict, and urged Germany to follow Spain's example. He further proposed ending the stationing of US forces in Germany, as well as their nuclear weapons presence in the country.

==== China ====
AfD views on China have varied. The party had previously demanded the German government to strip the "developing country" status for China, voicing opposition to "Chinese economic espionage" and opposing Chinese state-owned company COSCO Shipping buying of a stake in the Port of Hamburg.

However, it started changing its position in 2023, with AfD's Bundestag caucus accusing foreign minister Annalena Baerbock and economic affairs minister Robert Habeck of launching an "economic war" against China. AfD has also criticised restrictions on the use of 5G material from Chinese companies Huawei and ZTE. AfD leader Tino Chrupalla has also voiced opposition to restrictions on Chinese technology and backed Chinese foreign minister Qin Gang on his peace-brokering efforts for the Russo-Ukrainian war.

AfD currently calls for closer economic, cultural and scientific relations with China. Nevertheless, in their manifesto for the 2025 federal election, AfD has also called for limits in the involvement of Chinese companies in Germany's seaports and digital infrastructure. It is also opposed to further development aid, including those that would benefit climate change programs or Chinese students in Germany.

== Organisation ==
=== Leadership ===
Leader		Portrait	Constituency	Took office	Left office	Tenure
1	Bernd Lucke (1962–)		European Parliament	14 April 2013	5 July 2015 (Left the party)	812 days
2	Frauke Petry (1975–)		Sächsische Schweiz-Osterzgebirge	4 July 2015	29 September 2017 (Left the party)	818 days
3	Jörg Meuthen (1961–)		European Parliament	5 July 2015	28 January 2022 (Left the party)	2399 days
4	Tino Chrupalla (1975–)		Görlitz	30 November 2019	Incumbent	2545 days
5	Alice Weidel (1979–)		Baden-Württemberg state list	18 June 2022	Incumbent	1614 days

=== Membership ===
Membership numbers
2013	17,687
2014	20,728
2015	16,385
2016	26,409
2017	29,000
2018	33,500
2019	35,100
2020	32,000
2023	34,000
2024	46,881
2025	70,000
2026	75,000

=== Party finances ===
Because the 2013 federal election was the first attempt to join by the party, AfD had not received any federal funds in the run-up to it; by receiving 2 million votes, it crossed the threshold for party funding and was expected to receive an estimated 1.3 to 1.5 million euros per year of state subsidies. After joining the parliament with more than 90 representatives in the 2017 federal election, the party received more than 70 million euros per year; this probably rose to more than 100 million euros per year from 2019 onward. The party has also established and acknowledged a foundation for political education, and other purposes, close to the party but organized separately, which may be able to claim up to 80 million euros per year. This foundation would need to be acknowledged by the federal parliament in Germany first, but it has a legal claim to these subsidies.

In 2018 the Alternative for Germany donation scandal became public, as federal and European Parliament politicians Alice Weidel, Jörg Meuthen, Marcus Pretzell, and Guido Reil had profited from illegal and unnamed donations from non-EU countries. The acceptance of donations from non-EU countries is prohibited for German parties and politicians.

=== Young Alternative for Germany ===
Young Alternative for Germany (German: Junge Alternative für Deutschland, JA) was founded in 2013 as the youth organisation of AfD, while remaining legally independent from its mother party. In view of JA's independence, it has been regarded by some in AfD's hierarchy as being somewhat wayward, with JA repeatedly accused of being "too far-right", politically regressive and antifeminist by the German mainstream media.

In December 2024 the main party of the AfD announced its intention to cut ties with the JA in connection to its classification by the Federal Office for the Protection of the Constitution. AfD leadership are planning to found a new organisation as its youth wing. On 12 January 2025, AfD leadership voted to formally replace the JA as its youth organisation.

=== International affiliation and relations ===
Following the 2014 European Parliament election on 12 June, AfD was accepted into the European Conservatives and Reformists (ECR) group in the European Parliament. In February 2016, AfD announced a closer cooperation with the right-wing populist party Freedom Party of Austria (FPÖ), which was a member of the Europe of Nations and Freedom (ENF) group. On 8 March 2016, the bureau of the ECR group began motions to exclude AfD MEPs from their group due to the party's links with the far-right FPÖ and controversial remarks by two party leaders about shooting immigrants. MEP Beatrix von Storch pre-empted her imminent expulsion by leaving the ECR group to join the Europe of Freedom and Direct Democracy group on 8 April, and Marcus Pretzell was expelled from the ECR group on 12 April 2016. During the party convention on 30 April 2016, Pretzell announced his intention to join the Europe of Nations and Freedom group, although he subsequently left AfD to join Petry's Blue Party.

In April 2019, Jörg Meuthen appeared alongside Northern League leader Matteo Salvini, National Rally leader Marine Le Pen, and politicians from the Danish People's Party and FPÖ to announce the formation of a new European political alliance. AfD later joined this group in the European Parliament, which was ultimately named the Identity and Democracy group. In July 2023, the AfD joined the Identity and Democracy Party, the European political party affiliated with this group.

The AfD initially maintained close cooperation with the French National Rally and Marine Le Pen. In February 2024, it was reported that the relations between the two parties had become strained after AfD spokesmen attended the 2023 Potsdam far-right meeting. In response, the AfD's leadership held a meeting with Le Pen and denied endorsing the words of some of the people at the meeting.

In May 2024, it was reported that the National Rally and other members of the Identity and Democracy group had announced they would no longer sit with the AfD following the 2024 European Parliament election after AfD's lead candidate for the election Maximilian Krah made remarks in an interview on Nazi Germany and allegedly suggested that not all members of the Waffen-SS should be seen as criminals. Italy's Lega and the Czech Freedom and Direct Democracy (SPD) backed the National Rally's decision and announced they would also formally cease cooperation with the AfD while the Danish People's Party issued an ultimatum that they would only continue working with AfD on the condition of Krah's removal. The Flemish Vlaams Belang criticised Krah's words as "increasingly problematic" but declined to immediately expel the AfD faction, stating they preferred to review the situation after the election. The Estonian EKRE and the FPÖ supported expelling Krah but opposed the expulsion of AfD. After an internal meeting and vote, the Identity and Democracy board subsequently agreed to expel AfD, with group leader Marco Zanni citing Krah's interview, as well as allegations of Chinese and Russian espionage influence on AfD. The party consequently moved to non-inscrits. Following the decision, AfD said they would negotiate to rejoin the group and announced Krah would not sit with the AfD faction in the European Parliament after the election.

AfD also has ties to parties like Hungary's Our Homeland Movement, the Confederation of the Polish Crown (KKP), the Dutch Forum for Democracy (FvD), the French Reconquête, Slovakia's Republic party, the Liberal Democratic Party of Belarus, Bulgaria's Revival, Alternative for Sweden, Serbia's Dveri and the Serbian Party Oathkeepers. Following the 2024 European Parliament election, the AfD began negotiations with several of these parties to form a new European Parliament group. Although the AfD originally negotiated with S.O.S. Romania, it later rejected S.O.S.'s attempt to join the group. The KKP was also eventually rejected from the group. Despite the Czech SPD's prior declaration that it would not sit with the AfD, and past opposition by Poland's New Hope to cooperation with the AfD, both parties ultimately joined the AfD-led Europe of Sovereign Nations group. In August 2024, AfD also formed the Europe of Sovereign Nations party.

In the United States, AfD has connections with former Department of Government Efficiency leader Elon Musk and groups associated with the Republican Party, particularly the Young Republicans. In response to the German domestic intelligence agency 2025 classification of the party as a "confirmed right-wing extremist endeavor" permitting monitoring of it, US Vice President JD Vance wrote, "The West tore down the Berlin Wall together. And it has been rebuilt – not by the Soviets or the Russians, but by the German establishment." US secretary of state Marco Rubio also wrote "Germany just gave its spy agency new powers to surveil the opposition. That's not democracy – it's tyranny in disguise."

AfD has contacts with the People's Party of Canada through the AfD MEP Christine Anderson. The former President of Switzerland, Ueli Maurer of the Swiss People's Party, has endorsed the 2025 AfD election campaign and addressed AfD events.

In February 2025, Hungarian Prime Minister Viktor Orbán and Weidel announced the start of cooperation between AfD and Fidesz. During its 2025 German federal election campaign, the AfD also received support from the Spanish Vox party and the Alliance of Independent Social Democrats in Bosnia and Herzegovina.

AfD has some links with the UK Homeland Party.

== Public profile ==
=== Early days ===
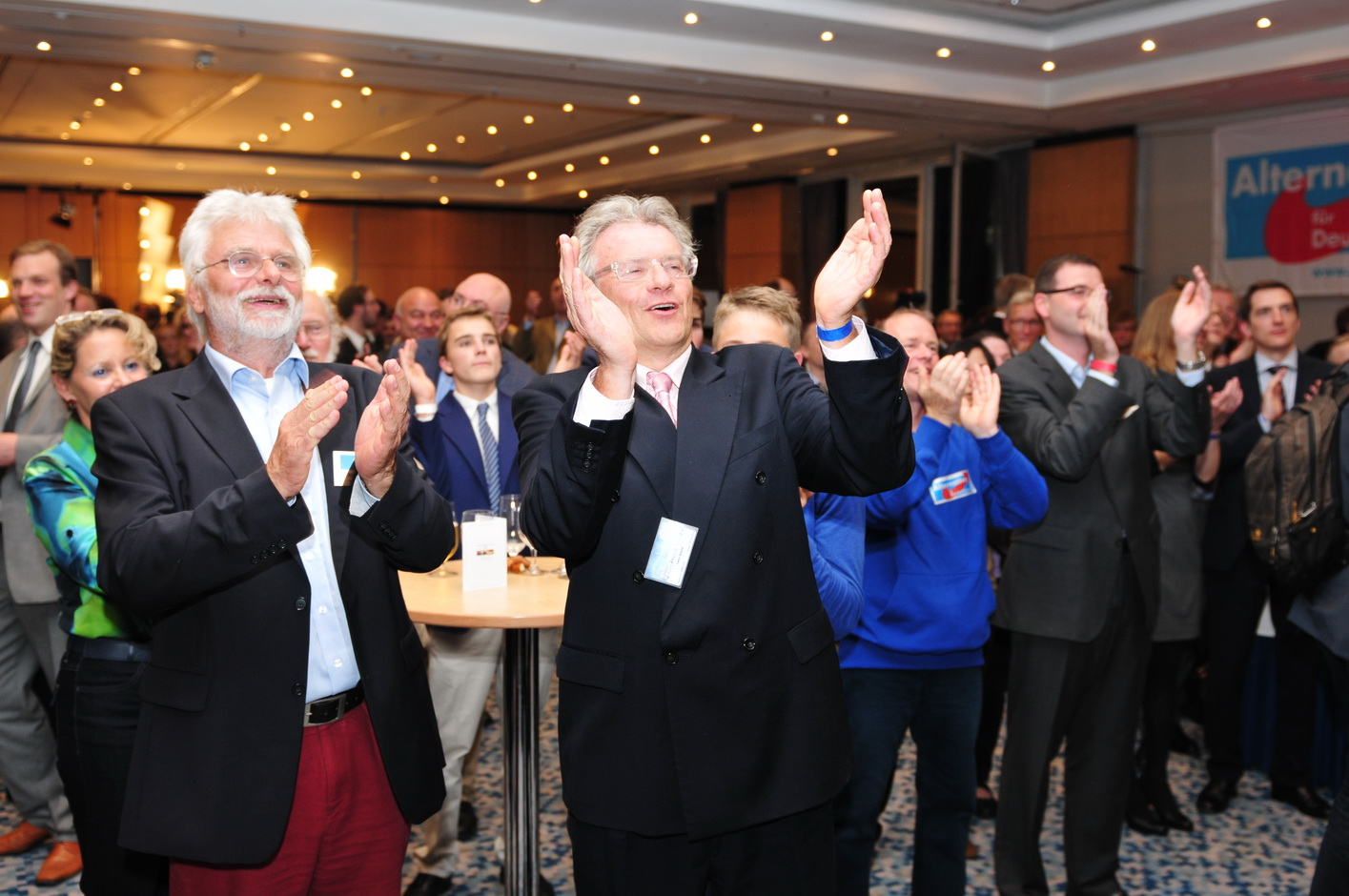
AfD leaders in 2013

At the outset, AfD presented itself as conservative and middle-class, catering to a well-educated demographic; around two-thirds of supporters listed on its website in the early days held doctorates, leading to AfD being nicknamed the "professors' party" in its early days. The party was described as professors and academics who dislike the compromises inflicted on their purist theories by German party politics. 86% of the party's initial supporters were male.

=== Relationship with other groups ===
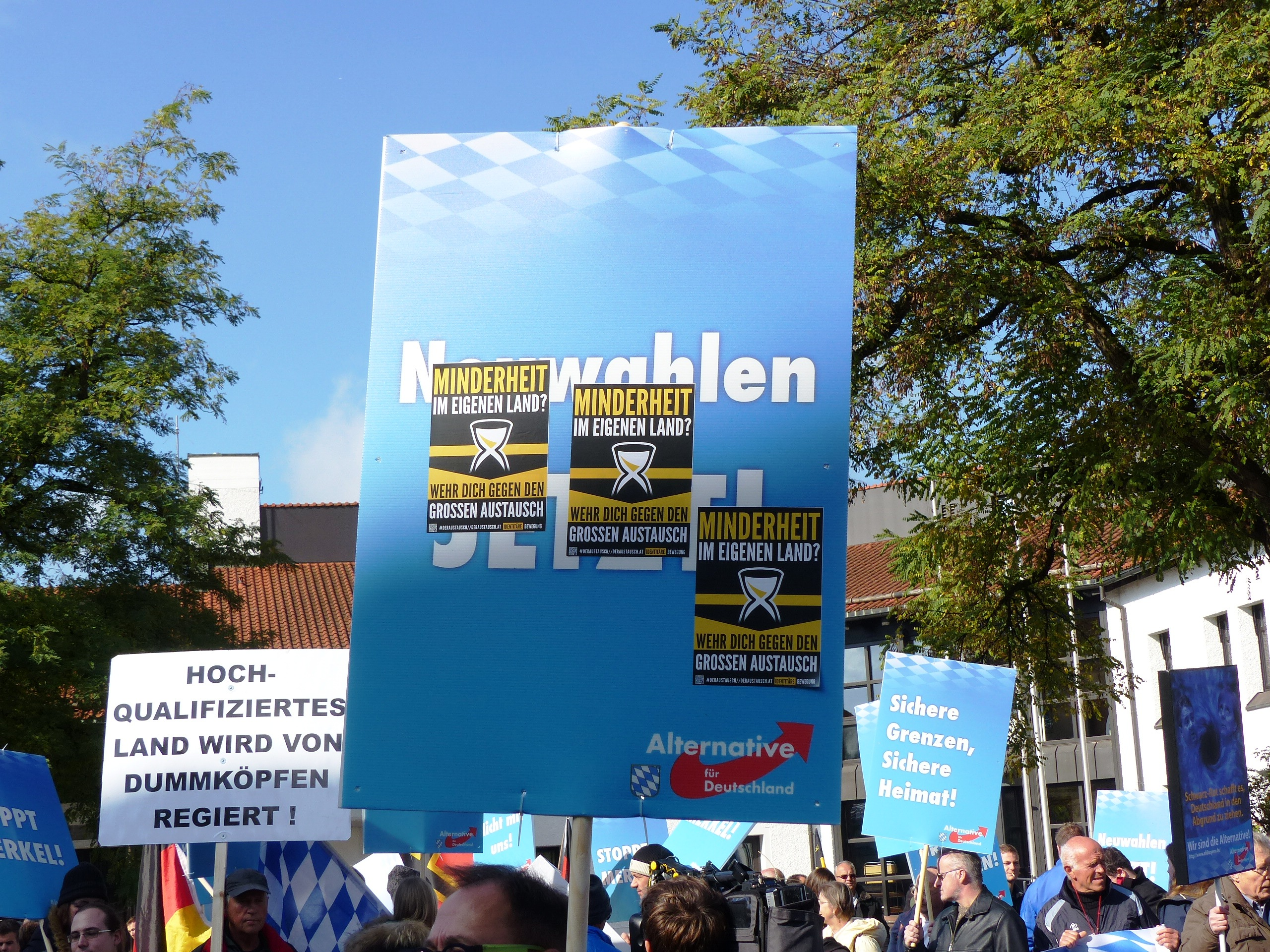
Sticker of nationalistic Identitarian movement at AfD Bavaria Banner

It was alleged that outside the Berlin hotel where the party held its inaugural meeting, copies of Junge Freiheit, a weekly that is also popular with the far right, were being handed out. The Rheinische Post pointed out that some AfD members and supporters wrote for the paper. There was also a protest outside the venue of the party's inaugural meeting by Andreas Storr, a National Democratic Party of Germany (NPD) representative in the Landtag of Saxony, as the NPD sees AfD as a rival for Eurosceptic votes.

In 2013, AfD party organizers sent out the message that they are not trying to attract right-wing radicals and toned down rhetoric on their Facebook page following media allegations that it too closely evoked the language of the far right. At that time, AfD checked applicants for membership to exclude far-right and former NPD members who support the anti-euro policy. The former party chairman Bernd Lucke stated that "[t]he applause is coming from the wrong side", regarding praise his party gained from the NPD.

Members of Alliance 90/Green Party have accused AfD of pandering to xenophobic and nationalistic sentiments. There have been altercations between AfD members and Green Youth members. Following the 2013 federal election, the anti-Islam German Freedom Party unilaterally pledged to support AfD in the 2014 elections and concentrate its efforts on local elections only. Bernd Lucke responded by saying that the German Freedom Party's support was unwanted and sent a letter to AfD party associations recommending a hiring freeze.

Stern reported that among 396 AfD candidates for the 2017 Bundestag, 47 candidates did not distance themselves from right-wing extremism. Although a large proportion of the candidates are not openly racist, some relativize Germany's role in World War II or call for the recognition of a "Cult of Guilt". 30 candidates claimed to tolerate right-wing friends in their profile or were themselves members of groups associated with such people; others said that they mourned the German Reich or used their symbols.

In 2018 Tino Chrupalla, the current co-leader of AfD, gave an interview to holocaust denier, antisemite and right-wing extremist Nikolai Nerling, which was uploaded to YouTube. It was staged as having occurred by chance, but an earlier shot in the video reveals Chrupalla waiting in the background. As such, the interview was cited in the 2019 Federal Office for the Protection of the Constitution report on AfD as evidence of the party's "Connections to the framework of a so-called new right or right-wing populist 'resistance milieu'".

On 24 June 2024 it was announced that two parliamentary groups consisting of members of the AfD and Die Heimat (formerly the NPD) had been formed in the Brandenburg town of Lauchhammer and the district of Oberspreewald-Lausitz. In Lauchhammer, the joint parliamentary group will be represented in the town council under the name "AfDplus", while the "Heimat & Zukunft" parliamentary group has been formed in the district council of Oberspreewald-Lausitz. Thomas Gürtler from Die Heimat will play a leading role in both bodies. This development is seen as the first official coalition between AfD and the far-right party Die Heimat. The formation of the parliamentary groups was supported by statements made by AfD chairman Tino Chrupalla, who emphasised that there would be no "firewalls" to other parties at local level.

=== Refugees ===
In 2016 AfD MEP Marcus Pretzell was expelled from the party after he said that German borders should be defended from incursion by refugees "with armed force as a measure of last resort".

Later that same year, former AfD party chair and MEP Frauke Petry told a reporter from the regional newspaper Mannheimer Morgen that the German Border police must do their jobs by "hindering illegal entry of refugees" and that they may "use firearms if necessary" to "prevent illegal border crossings". Petry later stated that no policeman "wants to fire on a refugee and I don't want that either" but that border police must follow the law to maintain the integrity of European borders. Afterwards, Petry made several attempts to justify these statements.

=== Pegida ===
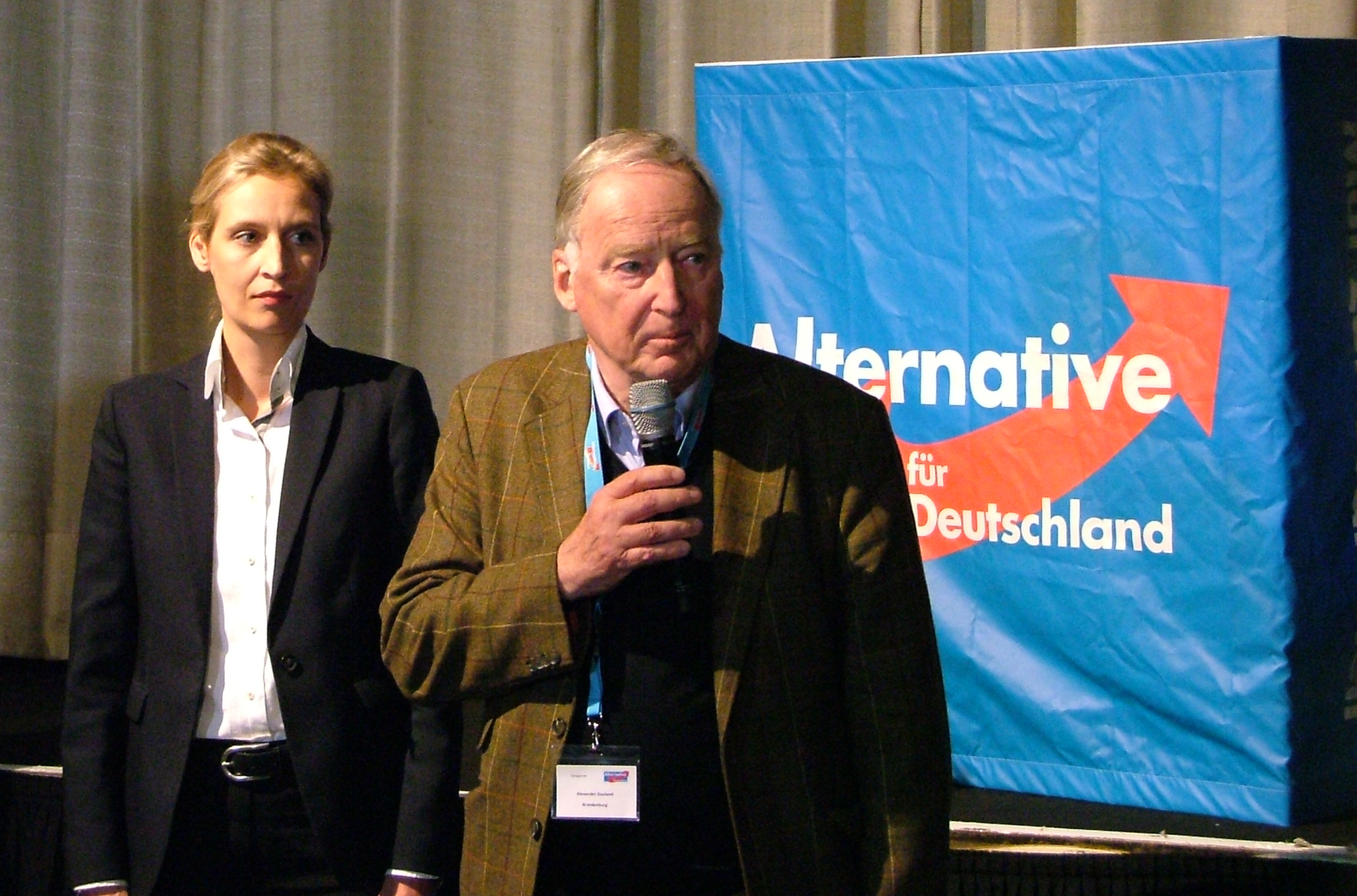
Alice Weidel and Alexander Gauland in April 2017

In response to the Pegida movement and demonstrations, members of AfD have expressed different opinions of it, with Lucke describing the movement as "a sign that these people do not feel their concerns are understood by politicians". In response to the CDU Interior Minister Thomas de Maizière alleging an "overlap" between Pegida rallies and AfD, Alexander Gauland stated that AfD are "natural allies of this movement". Hans-Olaf Henkel asked members of the party not to join the demonstrations, telling Der Tagesspiegel that he believed it could not be ruled out that they had "xenophobic or even racist connotations".

A straw poll by The Economist found that nine out of ten Pegida protesters would back the AfD.

=== Neo-Nazi controversies ===
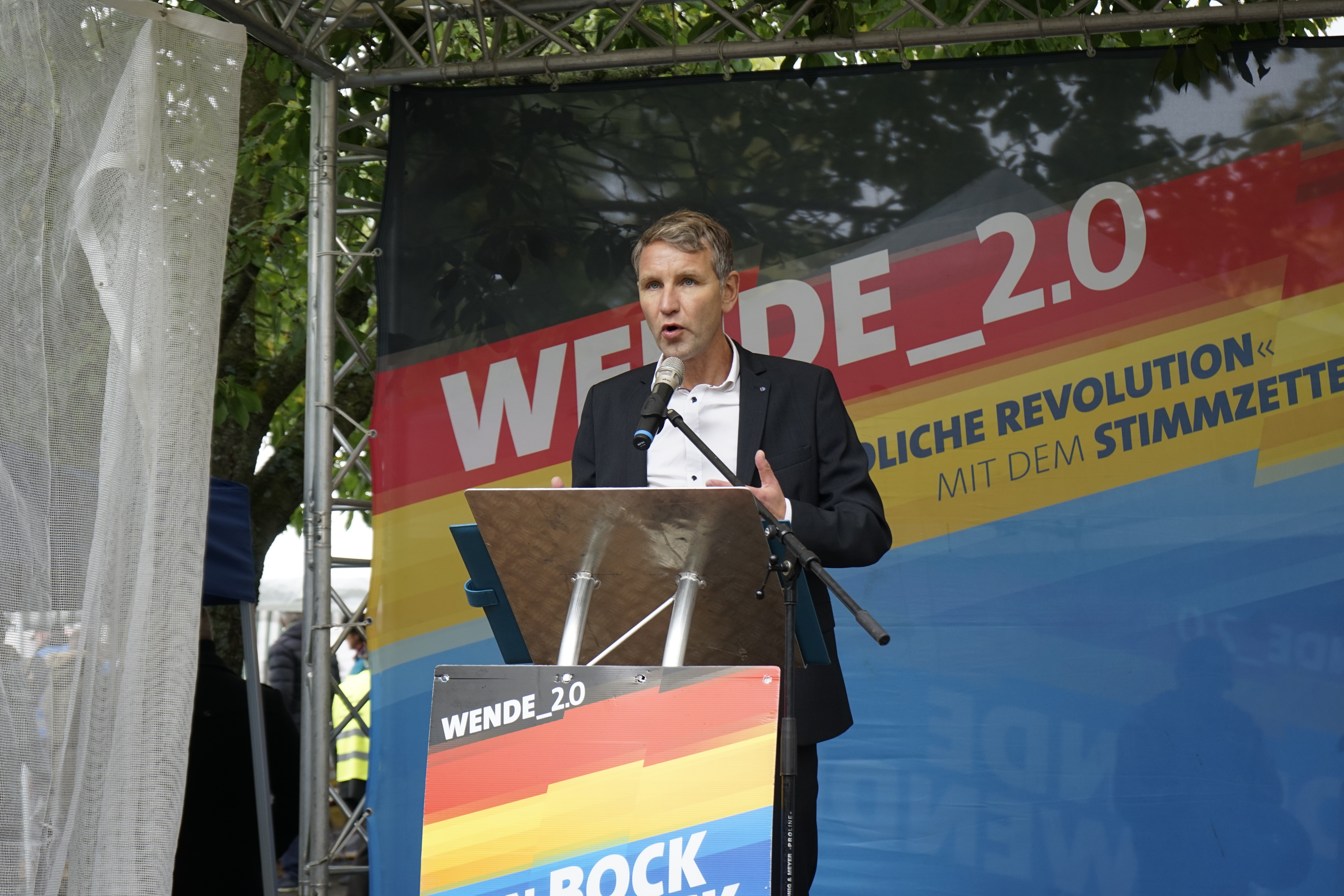
Björn Höcke at a rally for the 2019 state election

In January 2017 Björn Höcke, one of the founders of AfD, gave a speech in Dresden in which he stated that "we Germans are the only people in the world who have planted a memorial of shame in the heart of their capital". He suggested that Germans "need to make a 180 degree change in their politics of commemoration". The speech was widely criticised as antisemitic or neo-Nazi, among others by Jewish leaders in Germany. Höcke was described by party chairwoman Frauke Petry as a "burden to the party"; other members such as Alexander Gauland, said that they found no antisemitism in the speech.

In February 2017, AfD leaders asked for Höcke to be expelled from the party due to his speech. The arbitration committee of AfD in Thuringia was set to rule on the leaders' request. In May 2018, an AfD tribunal ruled that Höcke could remain in the party.

The AfD politician Matthias Helferich had described himself in social media messages as the "friendly face of the ns [sic]", referring to National Socialism. Helferich also called himself a "democratic Freisler", referring to a Nazi-era judge.

In January 2024 it was revealed that senior members of the party, including Roland Hartwig, then advisor to party co-leader Alice Weidel, attended a meeting alongside neo-Nazi influencers, where plans for the deportation of millions of "asylum seekers", "non-assimilated people", and those with "non-German backgrounds" were discussed, including those with German citizenship and residency rights. The event triggered the 2024 German anti-extremism protests.

In May 2024, Höcke was convicted and fined €13,000 by the state court in Halle for deliberately using a banned slogan "Alles für Deutschland", associated with the Nazi Party's paramilitary wing, in a May 2021 campaign speech. That same month, AfD member Maximilian Krah's defence of the Waffen-SS caused controversy.

Following the 2025 federal election it was confirmed that Krah and Matthias Helferich would be joining the parliament.

=== 'Extremist' designation ===
On 2 May 2025 the German domestic intelligence agency, Bundesamt für Verfassungsschutz (BfV), published a report spanning 1,100 pages which sought to assess whether the AfD should be designated as an 'extremist' group. Central to its thesis was the party's anti-Muslim stance, and its favouring of national and ethnic Germans over migrants. AfD denounced its designation as a politically motivated attempt to discredit and criminalize it. The designation opens the possibility of civil servants belonging to the AfD facing dismissal depending on their role within the entity, according to the country's interior ministry. In response, the AfD filed a lawsuit.

=== Alleged Pro-Russia movement ===
The German domestic secret service found that Russia is trying to "destabilize the democratic system of Germany on many levels." According to the head of the service Thomas Haldenwang, Russian narratives are being spread by parts of the AfD and are contributing to the expansion of right-wing populism.

AfD members and activists were listed as keeping close ties with Russian politicians and receiving financial benefits in an OCCRP investigation of Russia's International Agency for Current Policy.

=== Initiatives and Networks ===
==== Vadar ====
AfD politicians Eugen Schmidt, Olga Petersen, and Ulrich Oehme founded the "Association for the Prevention of Discrimination and Exclusion of Russian-Germans and Russian-speaking Fellow Citizens in Germany" (Vadar e.V.) in June 2022. The association attests that Germany has an "anti-Russian mood" and wants to offer legal help to "Russian-Germans and Russian-speaking fellow citizens" who would be discriminated against or excluded by the war of aggression. The association says it financed the legal representation of pro-Russian influencer Alina Lipp and is opposed to the German ban on the Russian military and propaganda symbol Z. The association denies Russian war crimes in the Russo-Ukrainian War.

According to a report in the Sächsische Zeitung, Vadar shares a bank account with an institution that is majority Russian-owned. According to German public broadcaster ARD, German security authorities are investigating the association connections to Russian authorities.

==== International Agency for Current Policy ====
An Organized Crime and Corruption Reporting Project (OCCRP) investigation from February 2023 found evidence that AfD is a key ally for the International Agency for Current Policy, an organization established by Russian parliamentary staffer Sargis Mirzakhanian whose internal documents describe it as a "closed association of professionals" engaged in a variety of pro-Russian activities. These include organizing street protests against NATO, bringing European delegations to Moscow and Crimea, and targeting "national parliaments of the EU" with resolutions to end EU sanctions on Russia and to grant recognition to Russia's annexation of Crimea. Internal emails, including some from Mirzakhanyan, document substantial payments to EU politicians made in exchange for pro-Kremlin motions in their home countries, and to journalist and AfD member Manuel Ochsenreiter for publishing pro-Russian propaganda in his Zuerst! magazine.

== Election results ==
=== Federal Parliament (Bundestag) ===
Election	Constituency		Party list		Seats	+/–	Status
Election	Votes	%	Votes	%	Seats	+/–	Status
2013	810,915	1.9 (#8)	2,056,985	4.7 (#7)	0 / 631	New	No seats
2017	5,317,499	11.5 (#3)	5,878,115	12.6 (#3)	94 / 709	▲94	Opposition
2021	4,699,917	10.2 (#4)	4,809,228	10.4 (#5)	83 / 735	▼11	Opposition
2025	10,177,318	20.6 (#2)	10,328,780	20.8 (#2)	152 / 630	▲69	Opposition

=== European Parliament ===
Election	List leader	Votes	%	Seats	+/–	EP Group
2014	Bernd Lucke	2,070,014	7.05 (#5)	7 / 96	New	ECR
2019	Jörg Meuthen	4,103,453	10.98 (#4)	11 / 96	▲4	ID
2024	Maximilian Krah	6,324,008	15.89 (#2)	15 / 96	▲4	ESN

=== State parliaments (Landtage) ===
State parliament	Election	Votes	%	Seats	+/–	Status
Baden-Württemberg	2026	1,010,449	18.8 (#3)	35 / 157	▲18	Opposition
Bavaria	2023	1,999,924	14.6 (#3)	32 / 203	▲10	Opposition
Berlin	2026	296,601	16.3 (#3)	29 / 158	▲12	Opposition
Brandenburg	2024	438,811	29.2 (#2)	30 / 88	▲7	Opposition
Bremen	2023	Did not run	–	0 / 87	Steady	No seats
Hamburg	2025	329,066	7.5 (#5)	10 / 121	▲3	Opposition
Hesse	2023	518,674	18.4 (#2)	28 / 133	▲9	Opposition
Lower Saxony	2022	396,839	11.0 (#4)	18 / 146	▲9	Opposition
Mecklenburg-Vorpommern	2026	388,026	38.2 (#1)	32 / 71	▲18	Opposition
North Rhine-Westphalia	2022	388,768	5.4 (#5)	12 / 195	▼4	Opposition
Rhineland-Palatinate	2026	394,803	19.5 (#3)	24 / 105	▲15	Opposition
Saarland	2022	25,718	5.7 (#3)	3 / 51	Steady	Opposition
Saxony	2024	719,274	30.6 (#2)	40 / 120	▲2	Opposition
Saxony-Anhalt	2026	576,037	43.8 (#1)	39 / 83	▲16	TBD
Schleswig-Holstein	2022	61,169	4.4 (#6)	0 / 69	▼5	No seats
Thuringia	2024	396,704	32.8 (#1)	32 / 88	▲10	Opposition

=== Results timeline ===
Year	(Germany) DE	(European Union) EU	(Baden-Württemberg) BW	(Bavaria) BY	(Berlin) BE	(Brandenburg) BB	(Bremen (state)) HB	(Hamburg) HH	(Hesse) HE	(Lower Saxony) NI	(Mecklenburg-Vorpommern) MV	(North Rhine-Westphalia) NW	(Rhineland-Palatinate) RP	(Saarland) SL	(Saxony) SN	(Saxony-Anhalt) ST	(Schleswig-Holstein) SH	(Thuringia) TH
2013	▲4.7	N/A	N/A	N/A	N/A	N/A	N/A	N/A	▲1.3	N/A	N/A	N/A	N/A	N/A	N/A	N/A	N/A	N/A
2014	▲4.7	▲7.1	N/A	N/A	N/A	▲12.2	N/A	N/A	▲1.3	N/A	N/A	N/A	N/A	N/A	▲9.7	N/A	N/A	▲10.6
2015	▲4.7	▲7.1	N/A	N/A	N/A	▲12.2	▲5.5	▲6.1	▲1.3	N/A	N/A	N/A	N/A	N/A	▲9.7	N/A	N/A	▲10.6
2016	▲4.7	▲7.1	▲15.1	N/A	▲14.2	▲12.2	▲5.5	▲6.1	▲1.3	N/A	▲20.8	N/A	▲12.6	N/A	▲9.7	▲24.3	N/A	▲10.6
2017	▲12.6	▲7.1	▲15.1	N/A	▲14.2	▲12.2	▲5.5	▲6.1	▲1.3	▲6.2	▲20.8	▲**7.4**	▲12.6	▲**6.2**	▲9.7	▲24.3	▲**5.9**	▲10.6
2018	▲12.6	▲7.1	▲15.1	▲10.2	▲14.2	▲12.2	▲5.5	▲6.1	▲13.1	▲6.2	▲20.8	▲**7.4**	▲12.6	▲**6.2**	▲9.7	▲24.3	▲**5.9**	▲10.6
2019	▲12.6	▲11.0	▲15.1	▲10.2	▲14.2	▲23.5	▲**6.1**	▲6.1	▲13.1	▲6.2	▲20.8	▲**7.4**	▲12.6	▲**6.2**	▲27.5	▲24.3	▲**5.9**	▲23.4
2020	▲12.6	▲11.0	▲15.1	▲10.2	▲14.2	▲23.5	▲**6.1**	▼5.3	▲13.1	▲6.2	▲20.8	▲**7.4**	▲12.6	▲**6.2**	▲27.5	▲24.3	▲**5.9**	▲23.4
2021	▼10.4	▲11.0	▼9.7	▲10.2	▼8.0	▲23.5	▲**6.1**	▼5.3	▲13.1	▲6.2	▼16.7	▲**7.4**	▼8.3	▲**6.2**	▲27.5	▼20.8	▲**5.9**	▲23.4
2022	▼10.4	▲11.0	▼9.7	▲10.2	▼8.0	▲23.5	▲**6.1**	▼5.3	▲13.1	▲**11.0**	▼16.7	▼5.4	▼8.3	▼5.7	▲27.5	▼20.8	▼4.4	▲23.4
2023	▼10.4	▲11.0	▼9.7	▲**14.6**	▲9.1	▲23.5	N/A	▼5.3	▲**18.4**	▲**11.0**	▼16.7	▼5.4	▼8.3	▼5.7	▲27.5	▼20.8	▼4.4	▲23.4
2024	▼10.4	▲**15.8**	▼9.7	▲**14.6**	▲9.1	▲**29.2**	N/A	▼5.3	▲**18.4**	▲**11.0**	▼16.7	▼5.4	▼8.3	▼5.7	▲**30.6**	▼20.8	▼4.4	▲**32.8**
2025	▲**20.8**	▲**15.8**	▼9.7	▲**14.6**	▲9.1	▲**29.2**	N/A	▲**7.5**	▲**18.4**	▲**11.0**	▼16.7	▼5.4	▼8.3	▼5.7	▲**30.6**	▼20.8	▼4.4	▲**32.8**
2026	▲**20.8**	▲**15.8**	▲**18.8**	▲**14.6**	▲**16.3**	▲**29.2**	N/A	▲**7.5**	▲**18.4**	▲**11.0**	▲**38.2**	▼5.4	▲**19.5**	▼5.7	▲**30.6**	▲**43.8**	▼4.4	▲**32.8**
Year	(Germany) DE	(European Union) EU	(Baden-Württemberg) BW	(Bavaria) BY	(Berlin) BE	(Brandenburg) BB	(Bremen (state)) HB	(Hamburg) HH	(Hesse) HE	(Lower Saxony) NI	(Mecklenburg-Vorpommern) MV	(North Rhine-Westphalia) NW	(Rhineland-Palatinate) RP	(Saarland) SL	(Saxony) SN	(Saxony-Anhalt) ST	(Schleswig-Holstein) SH	(Thuringia) TH
**Bold** indicates best result to date. Present in legislature
