= David S. Stoffer =

American statistician, professor, and author

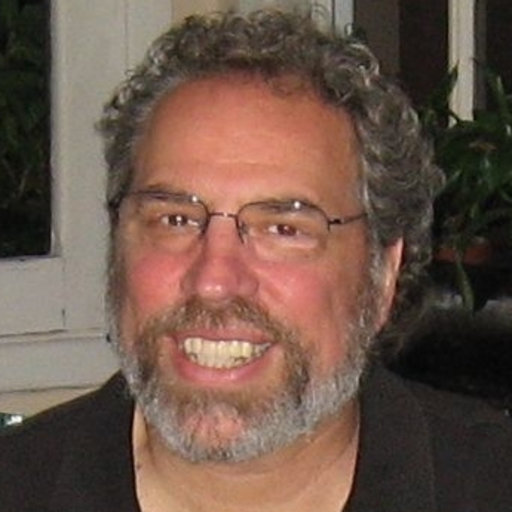

David S. Stoffer is an American statistician, and Professor Emeritus of Statistics at the University of Pittsburgh. He is the author of several books on time series analysis, Time Series Analysis and Its Applications: With R Examples with Robert H. Shumway, Nonlinear Time Series: Theory, Methods, and Applications with R Examples with R. Douc and E. Moulines, and Time Series: A Data Analysis Approach Using R with Robert H. Shumway.

Stoffer's research includes papers on the subject of time series analysis, for example, with missing data in An Approach to Time Series Smoothing and Forecasting Using the EM Algorithm published in the Journal of Time Series Analysis, the spectral analysis of qualitative time series in Spectral Analysis For Categorical Time Series: Scaling and the Spectral Envelope published in Biometrika, and numerical methods for time series in A Monte Carlo Approach to Nonnormal and Nonlinear State-Space Modeling and Bootstrapping State-Space Models: Gaussian Maximum Likelihood Estimation and the Kalman Filter both published in the Journal of the American Statistical Association. Many of his contributions are explained with numerical examples in his Springer text, Time Series Analysis and Its Applications: With R Examples (ISBN 978-3-319-52451-1).

In 1989 Stoffer, along with collaborators from the University of Pittsburgh School of Medicine, received the American Statistical Association's Outstanding Statistical Application Award for the article A Walsh-Fourier Analysis of the Effects of Moderate Maternal Alcohol Consumption on Neonatal Sleep-State Cycling published in the Journal of the American Statistical Association. The award was presented to Stoffer in person at the Joint Statistical Meetings (JSM) held in Washington, D.C..

Stoffer's research was continually supported by the U.S. National Science Foundation (NSF) and in 2008, he became a Program Director for two years at the NSF Division of Mathematical Sciences (DMS) through the Intergovernmental Personnel Act (IPA) program. He returned to NSF-DMS in the first part of 2018 as a Program Director.

In 2006, Stoffer was named Fellow of the American Statistical Association, and in 2020 he was named a Wiley, Journal of Time Series Analysis Distinguished Author.

Stoffer has acted as Editor or Associate Editor for the Journal of Time Series Analysis, Journal of Forecasting, Annals of the Institute of Statistical Mathematics, Journal of Business and Economic Statistics, and Journal of the American Statistical Association.
