= Bernd Lucke =

German economist, professor and author (born 1962)

- Lucke in 2017 at the European Parliament

Leader of the Alternative for Germany
- In office 14 April 2013 – 5 July 2015 Serving with Frauke Petry, Konrad Adam
- Preceded by: Position established
- Succeeded by: Jörg Meuthen

Leader of the Liberal Conservative Reformers
- In office 10 November 2018 – 28 September 2019
- Preceded by: Stephanie Tsomakaeva (interim)
- Succeeded by: Jürgen Joost
- In office 19 July 2015 – 4 June 2016
- Preceded by: Position established
- Succeeded by: Ulrike Trebesius

Member of the European Parliament
- In office 1 July 2014 – 2 July 2019
- Preceded by: Multi-member district
- Succeeded by: Multi-member district
- Constituency: Germany

Personal details
- Born: 19 August 1962 (age 64) West Berlin, West Germany
- Party: We Citizens (since 2015)
- Other political affiliations: CDU (1978–2011); Free Voters (2013); AfD (2013–2015)
- Spouse: Dorothea Lucke
- Children: 5
- Education: University of Hamburg; University of Bonn
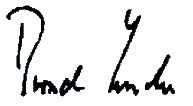
- Signature
- Website: www.bernd-lucke.de

Bernd Lucke (born 19 August 1962) is a German economist, professor, author and former politician. He co-founded the Alternative for Germany (AfD) in 2013 and served as the party's federal chairman until July 2015, when he was displaced and left the party soon after. He had been elected a member of the European Parliament (MEP) for the AfD in 2014 and served the five-year full term as a member of various other new parties, similar to some other former AfD MEPs.

Lucke was a professor of economics at the University of Hamburg before helping to found Wahlalternative 2013 ("Electoral Alternative 2013"), which would become the AfD. Lucke served as the party's spokesman until he lost a leadership election to Frauke Petry in July 2015. Petry's election was considered a party shift to extremist positions; Lucke subsequently left the party. In July 2015, he and other former AfD members founded the political party We Citizens (formerly known as Liberal-Konservative Reformer). He failed to win reelection in 2019 and has since returned to an academic career.

== Biography ==
=== Early life and professional career ===
Lucke was born in West Berlin in 1962. His father was an engineer, and his mother was a schoolteacher. In 1969, he moved to Haan in North Rhine-Westphalia.

From 1982 to 1984, Lucke studied economics, history, and philosophy at the University of Bonn; he undertook graduate studies in economics at the University of Bonn and UC Berkeley from 1984 to 1987. He completed his doctorate in 1991 with a dissertation on price stabilization in world agricultural markets under Jürgen Wolters at the Free University of Berlin. After the fall of the Berlin Wall, he worked in the Council of Economic Experts of the East German Government and, after the German reunification, as an assistant to the Senate of Berlin. Lucke's research interests include sovereign default, news-driven business cycles, growth in developing countries, dynamic CGE models, and applied econometrics.

Lucke has been an advisor to the World Bank and a visiting scholar at the University of British Columbia in Vancouver. He is a frequent guest on political talk shows in Germany. He is married and has five children.

== Political career and the AfD ==
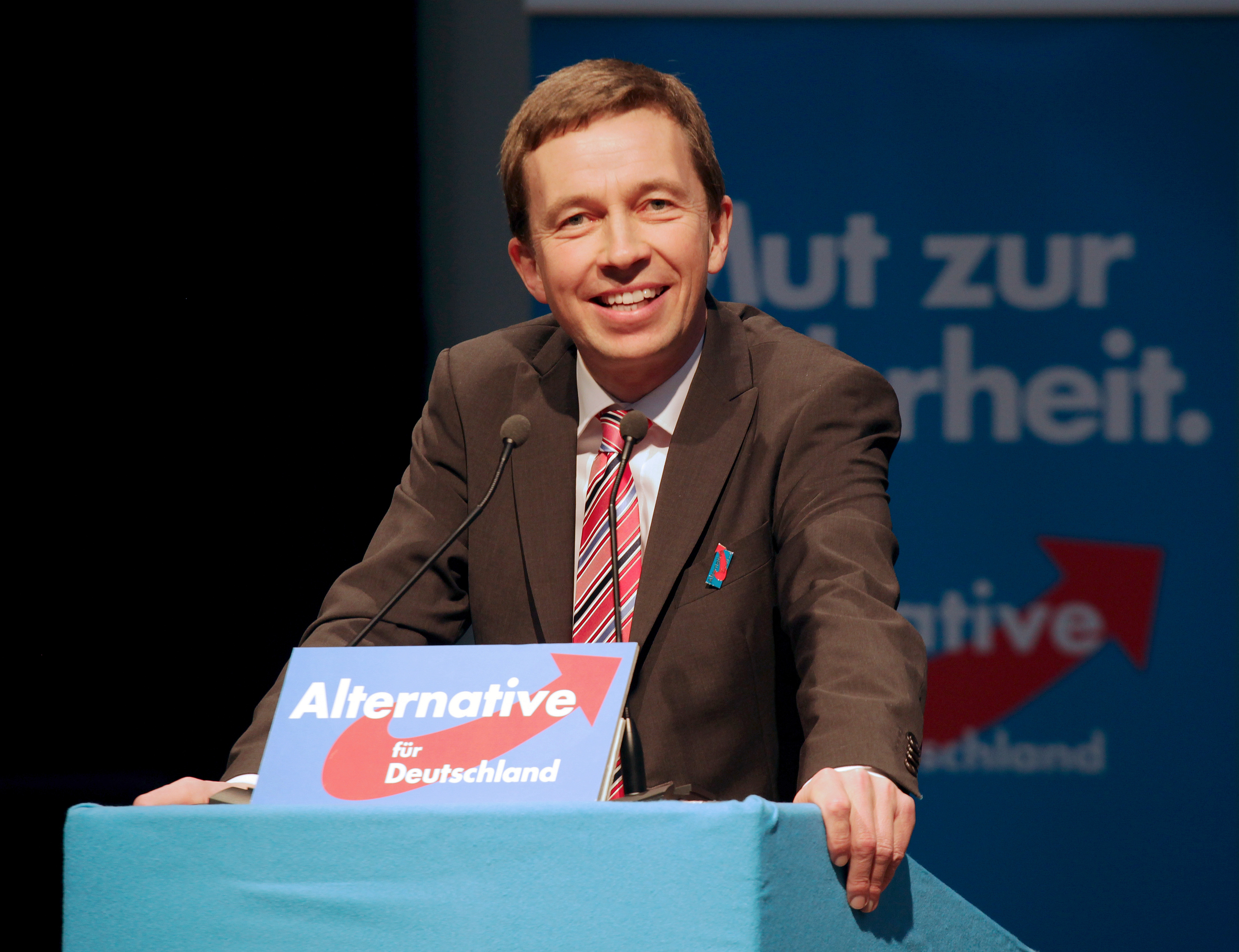
Lucke in 2014

Lucke joined the Junge Union, the youth wing of the Christian Democratic Union of Germany, as a teenager in response to the conditions of his relatives living in East Germany under communism. He was a member of the CDU for thirty years until 2011 when he cancelled his membership in opposition to the party's eurozone rescue policies. He first contested an election as a member of the Free Voters in the 2013 Lower Saxony state election but was not elected.

In 2013, he founded Wahlalternative 2013 ("Electoral Alternative 2013") with Alexander Gauland, Frauke Petry and Konrad Adam to oppose the German government's handling of the eurozone crisis. The group was later founded as the Alternative for Germany in April 2013, with Lucke as one of the party's three spokespeople. During his speech at the party's founding rally, he described the Euro currency as a "historic mistake."

During a campaign speech in Bremen on 24 August 2013, Lucke was attacked with pepper spray by two members of Anti-fascist Action. Several people in the audience were treated for irritation of the eyes and throat.

During the 2013 German federal election, Lucke stood as the AfD's top list candidate in Lower Saxony and for the directly elected seat of Harburg but was not elected to either. During the 2014 European Parliament election, Lucke was elected as an MEP and negotiated for the AfD to join the European Conservatives and Reformists. Lucke stated that the AfD's preferred partners in the European Parliament would be the British Conservative Party and that they would not team up with "xenophobic" parties.

Following the rise of the Pegida protests in Germany, which were welcomed by some AfD state branches, Lucke stated that most of the arguments voiced by Pegida were legitimate and that the movement was a sign that politicians had not listened to concerns felt by ordinary people.

On 4 July 2015, Lucke was displaced as leader of the party Alternative for Germany (AfD) by his former deputy, Frauke Petry, in a leadership election after several months of infighting. On 9 July 2015, Lucke left the Alternative for Germany, saying that the party had "fallen irretrievably into the wrong hands" after Petry's election and moved too far to the right by adopting what he termed as anti-foreigner positions. He also cited an “anti-Western, decidedly pro-Russian foreign and security policy orientation” and increasing calls to "pose the 'system question' regarding our parliamentary democracy" as reasons for his departure from the party. On 19 July, he and other former members of the AfD founded a new party, the Alliance for Progress and Renewal (ALFA). ALFA has since been renamed Liberal-Konservative Reformer ("Liberal Conservative Reformers," LKR) and later Wir Bürger ("Us Citizens").

In 2015, Lucke was announced as the LKR's top candidate for the Bundestag ahead of the 2017 German federal election. However, the LKR decided not to contest the election. The party stood in the 2019 European Parliament election, but all its MEPs, including Lucke, lost their seats.

== Post-AfD leadership ==
Lucke continued to work as a public commentator on economic and political affairs after his career as an MEP. In 2017, he argued that the German media should not "demonize" the AfD, arguing that voters for the party were concerned about legitimate issues but that the AfD leadership had become too extreme. However, in 2019, Lucke supported a proposal by the Federal Office for the Protection of the Constitution to monitor the AfD and claimed the party now contained right-wing extremist elements that went against the German constitution.

In October 2019, Lucke left politics and returned to academic work at the University of Hamburg as an economics teacher. He was unable to deliver two lectures after being assaulted by an Antifa activist. At the same time, the student union AStA called for Lucke's removal from the university due to his past association with the AfD and for what they argued was his role in helping the rise of the far-right in Germany. Lucke also turned down an offer by the university to host online classes and, later that month, could resume lectures under police protection. Lucke has also worked as an opinion columnist for Welt am Sonntag since 2019.

== Selected publications ==
- Beaudry, Paul; ——— (2009). "Letting Different Views about Business Cycles Compete". NBER Macroeconomics Annual. 24 (1): 413–456. doi:10.1086/648305. S2CID 7585799.
- ———; Lütkepohl, Helmut (2004). "On Unit Root Tests in the Presence of Transitional Growth". Economics Letters. 84 (3): 323–327. doi:10.1016/j.econlet.2004.02.012.
- ——— (2003). "Are Technical Trading Rules Profitable? Evidence for Head-and-shoulder Rules". Applied Economics. 35 (1): 33–40. doi:10.1080/00036840210150884. S2CID 11699815.
- ——— (1998). "Productivity shocks in a sectoral real business cycle model for West Germany". European Economic Review. 42 (2): 311–327. doi:10.1016/S0014-2921(97)00067-6. S2CID 154180554.
- ——— (1997). Theorie und Empirie realer Konjunkturzyklen. Studies in Contemporary Economics (in German). Heidelberg: Physica. ISBN 978-3-7908-1148-3.
