= Reil =

Reil may refer to:

- Reil (surname)
- Reil, Germany, a municipality in Rhineland-Palatinate, Germany
- Island of Reil, the insular cortex of the mammalian brain
- Runway end identifier lights, abbreviated REIL

== People with the given name ==
- Reil Cervantes (born 1986), Filipino professional basketball player
