= Kay Gottschalk =

German politician (born 1965)

Kay Gottschalk MdB
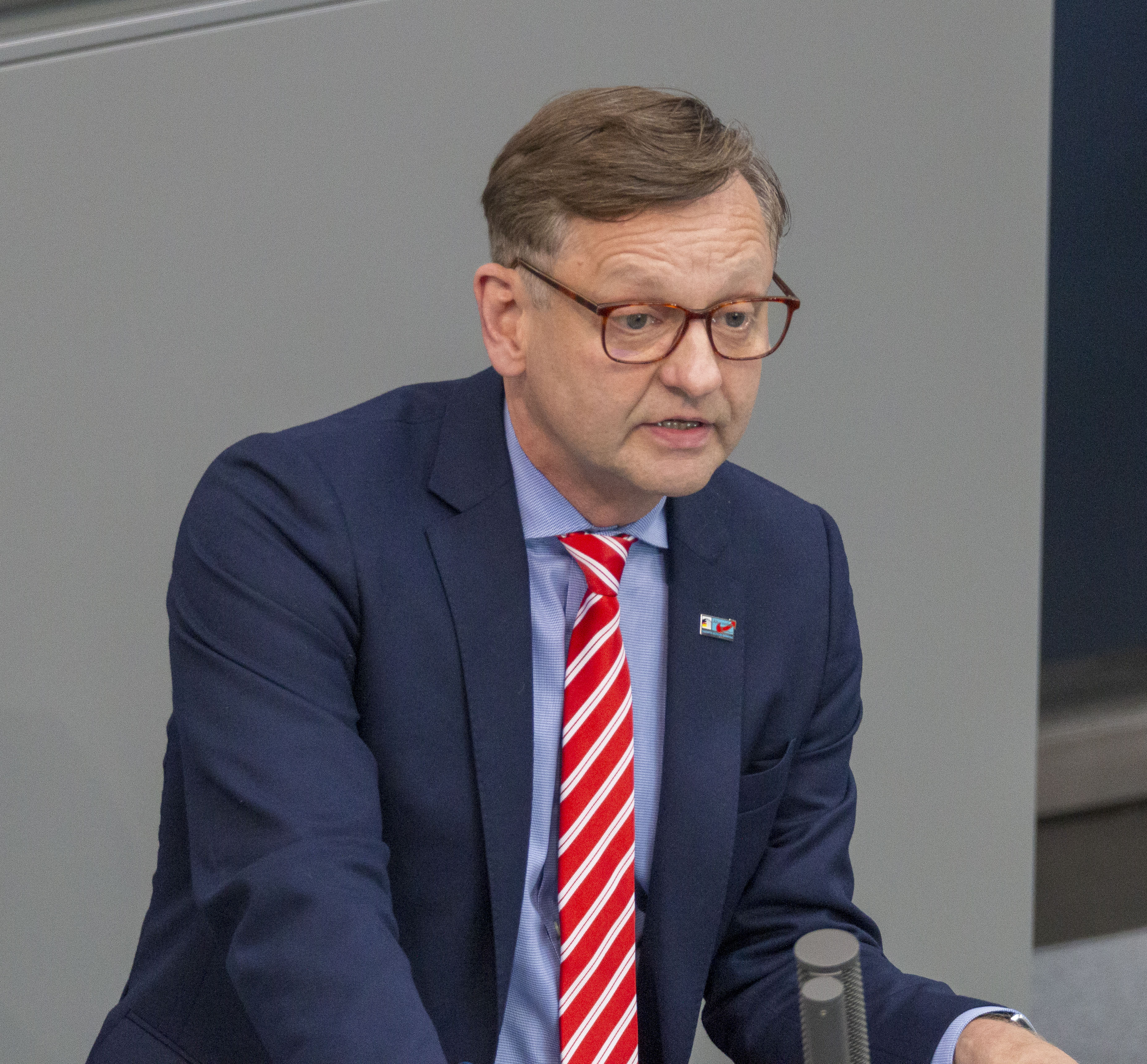
- Gottschalk in 2020

Deputy Leader of the Alternative for Germany
- In office 2 December 2017 – 1 December 2019 Serving with Beatrix von Storch
- Leader: Alexander Gauland; Jörg Meuthen
- Preceded by: Alexander Gauland
- Succeeded by: Andreas Kalbitz

Chair of the Wirecard scandal inquiry Committee
- In office 18 October 2020 – 25 June 2021
- Deputy: Hans Michelbach
- Preceded by: Position established
- Succeeded by: Position abolished

Member of the Bundestag for North Rhine-Westphalia
- Incumbent
- Assumed office 24 October 2017
- Preceded by: multi-member district
- Constituency: North Rhine-Westphalia

Personal details
- Born: 12 December 1965 (age 60) Hamburg, West Germany (now Germany)
- Party: Alternative for Germany (since 2013)
- Occupation: Politician; insurance manager; Businessman
- Website: Official website

Kay Gottschalk (born 12 December 1965) is a German politician of the Alternative for Germany (AfD) and member of the German federal parliament.

He is a co-founder of the AfD. He was one of three deputy federal spokespersons for the AfD from 2017 to 2019 and was re-elected deputy federal spokesperson in 2024. He has been the AfD parliamentary group's financial policy spokesperson since May 2018. In February 2022, he was elected deputy state chairman of the AfD in North Rhine-Westphalia and confirmed in office two years later.

== Early life and education ==
Gottschalk was born 1965 in Hamburg and studied business administration and law. He went on to become an insurance manager.

== Career ==
At the 2017 German federal election he was elected member of parliament through a list place in North Rhine-Westphalia.

In December 2017 he was elected as a deputy leader of the AfD. Since 2019 he was married. His husband died on 1 March 2023.

Following Russian invasion of Ukraine, Gottschalk, alongside AfD MEP Guido Reil and a delegation of NRW Landtag visited Ukraine and declared solidarity, representing a minority in the generally pro-Russian party.

In a speech on January 24, 2018 at the AfD's New Year's reception in Krefeld, Gottschalk said: "I call on all citizens of good will: Boycott the stores of the Turks in Germany, because 70 percent of them are going for Erdoğan" According to his own statements, it was important to him to make a statement against Turkey's attack on Kurdish citizens in Syria, and just as Germans are held responsible for the election of the NSDAP, Turkish citizens and citizens of Turkish origin in Germany should also be held responsible for the policies of said head of state. AfD member of parliament Martin Renner called on Gottschalk to resign from all offices. The state security authorities began investigating him because of Gottschalk's statement. However, these were discontinued by the Krefeld public prosecutor's office in summer 2018, as the offense of Section 130 StGB was not fulfilled.
