= Reil (surname) =

Reil is a surname. Notable people with the surname include:

- Billy Reil (born 1979), American professional wrestler
- Guido Reil (born 1970), German politician
- Johann Christian Reil (1759–1813), German physician, anatomist, and psychiatrist
- John Reil (born 1949), Canadian politician
- Jürgen Reil (born 1966), German musician
