= Roland Hartwig =

German politician

Member of the Bundestag
- Incumbent
- Assumed office 24 October 2017

Personal details
- Born: 22 September 1954 (age 71)
- Party: AfD

Roland Hartwig (born 22 September 1954) is a German politician for the populist Alternative for Germany (AfD) and member of the Bundestag between 2017 and 2021.

== Life and achievements ==
Hartwig was born 1954 in Berlin and studied jurisprudence at the University of Freiburg and became a Doctor of Law in 1984.

Hartwig was 'Chefsyndikus' (chief syndic) of the law department of the world leading chemical concern (business) Bayer from 1999 to 2016

Hartwig entered the newly founded AfD in 2013 and is since the 2017 German federal election member of the Bundestag.

== Political positions ==
Hartwig attended a secret meeting on 25 November 2023 at the Landhaus Adlon in Potsdam with participants from the New Right, including Austrian Identitarian Martin Sellner. At the meeting, a "master plan" for the practical implementation of the expulsion of millions of people from Germany, including those with German citizenship (so-called remigration), was reportedly discussed. In this context, Hartwig is said to have stated that he wanted to take the contents of the meeting to the AfD leadership. The AfD subsequently fired Hartwig.
