= Joachim Paul =

German politician

Member of the Landtag of Rhineland-Palatinate
- Incumbent
- Assumed office 18 May 2016

Personal details
- Born: July 10, 1970 (age 56) Bendorf, West Germany
- Citizenship: German
- Party: Alternative for Germany
- Education: University of Bonn; University of Massachusetts Boston; University of Mainz
- Occupation: Teacher; Politician

Joachim Paul (born 10 July 1970 in Bendorf) is a German politician serving since 2016 in the Landtag of Rhineland-Palatinate as a member of the Alternative for Germany (AfD). He was deputy chairman of the AfD parliamentary group in the state parliament of Rhineland-Palatinate from 2016 to 2021. He has also been deputy chairman of the AfD parliamentary group in the Koblenz city council since 2015. From 2019 to 2022, he was an assessor on the AfD federal executive board.

== Life and political career ==
Paul attended the Wilhelm-Remy-Gymnasium in Bendorf am Rhein and graduated with the Abitur. He then did his military service in the Feldjägerbataillon 740/251 in Mainz. Paul then studied German, history, political science, and sociology at the University of Bonn, the University of Massachusetts Boston, and the University of Mainz. Since his studies, Paul has been a member of the Old Breslauer Fraternity of the Raczeks in Bonn. After his studies, he worked as a teacher at the Albert Schweitzer High School in Kaiserslautern and then at the Ludwig Erhard School in Neuwied. Currently he is a teacher from Koblenz.

Paul joined the AfD in 2013 and was first elected to the Landtag of Rhineland-Palatinate in 2016. In 2019, Paul ran for chairmanship of the state AfD but subsequently withdrew. Also in 2019, he was removed from the chairmanship of the Landtag's Media Committee by the other parties (Christian Democratic Union of Germany (CDU), Social Democratic Party of Germany (SPD), Greens and Free Democratic Party (FDP)), citing indications of his "connection to right-wing extremist ideology". Media reports at the time claimed Paul had written for a magazine affiliated with the neo-Nazi National Democratic Party of Germany (NPD) under a pseudonym, which Paul has repeatedly denied.

=== 2025 Ludwigshafen mayoral disqualification ===
In the 2025 Ludwigshafen mayoral election, Paul declared his candidacy but was disqualified in August by the city's electoral committee due to their stated lack of confidence in Paul's adherence to the constitution, which is permissible under German law. The vote was 6–1, with members of the CDU, SPD and Free Voters (FW) voting against allowing Paul's candidacy. Prior to this, a report on Paul had been requested by incumbent mayor Jutta Steinruck from Germany's domestic intelligence agency, the Federal Office for the Protection of the Constitution.The report cited among other things Paul's use of the term "remigration", association with far-right groups or individuals such as Martin Sellner, and 2023 party office ban by the state AfD after allegedly showing a white power gesture (per his lawyer, this was later downgraded to a warning by the party court due to a lack of evidence). It also extensively quoted Paul's statements on the Nibelungenlied medieval epic poem and The Lord of the Rings series, whose protagonists he praised for their "deep commitment to their people, their culture, and their forefathers". Paul unsuccessfully appealed the ban twice in court.

The ban received national coverage and led to hate mail and threats against Steinruck, who was put under police protection. Among constitutional lawyers, Volker Boehme-Neßler viewed the ban as politically motivated and a practice "only known in authoritarian states", while Christian Pestalozza called the ban "a legally normal process that was carried out in accordance with the applicable laws".

In September 2025, Paul visited the White House alongside AfD deputy leader Beatrix von Storch to deliver talks about elections in Germany.
