= Helmut Lütkepohl =

German econometrician

- Born: 26 July 1951 (age 75)

Academic background
- Education: Bielefeld University

Academic work
- Discipline: Econometrics
- Institutions: Free University of Berlin; German Institute for Economic Research
- Website: Information at IDEAS / RePEc

Helmut Lütkepohl (born 26 July 1951) is a German econometrician specializing in time series analysis. Since January 2012, he has been Bundesbank Professor in the field of "Methods of Empirical Economics" at the Free University of Berlin and Dean of the Graduate Center at the German Institute for Economic Research.

== Education and career ==
After a diplom (1977) and doctorate (1981) from Bielefeld University, Lütkepohl was a Visiting Assistant Professor at the University of California, San Diego (1984–85). He became Professor of Statistics at the University of Kiel in 1987, and later moved on to become Professor of Econometrics at Humboldt University of Berlin.

Lütkepohl has been on the editorial boards of several scientific journals like Econometric Theory, Journal of Econometrics, Journal of Applied Econometrics, Macroeconomic Dynamics, Empirical Economics, and Econometric Reviews, and has published numerous papers in academic journals. He is the author, co-author and editor of many books, like Handbook of Matrices (Wiley, 1996), Applied Time Series Econometrics (Cambridge University Press, 2004) and New Introduction to Multiple Time Series Analysis (Springer, 2005).

== Selected publications ==
- Lanne, Markku; ———; Saikkonen, Pentti (2002). "Comparison of Unit Root Tests for Time Series with Level Shifts". Journal of Time Series Analysis. 23 (6): 667–685. doi:10.1111/1467-9892.00285. hdl:10419/61721. S2CID 52256742.
- Dolado, Juan J.; ——— (1996). "Making Wald Tests Work for Cointegrated VAR Systems". Econometric Reviews. 15 (4): 369–386. doi:10.1080/07474939608800362. hdl:10016/3306.
- ———; Reimers, Hans-Eggert (1992). "Impulse Response Analysis of Cointegrated Systems". Journal of Economic Dynamics and Control. 16 (1): 53–78. doi:10.1016/0165-1889(92)90005-Y.
- ——— (1985). "Comparison of Criteria for Estimating the Order of a Vector Autoregressive Process". Journal of Time Series Analysis. 6 (1): 35–52. doi:10.1111/j.1467-9892.1985.tb00396.x.
- ——— (1982). "Non-Causality Due to Omitted Variables". Journal of Econometrics. 19 (2–3): 367–378. doi:10.1016/0304-4076(82)90011-2.
