= Konrad Adam =

German journalist, publicist and politician (born 1974)

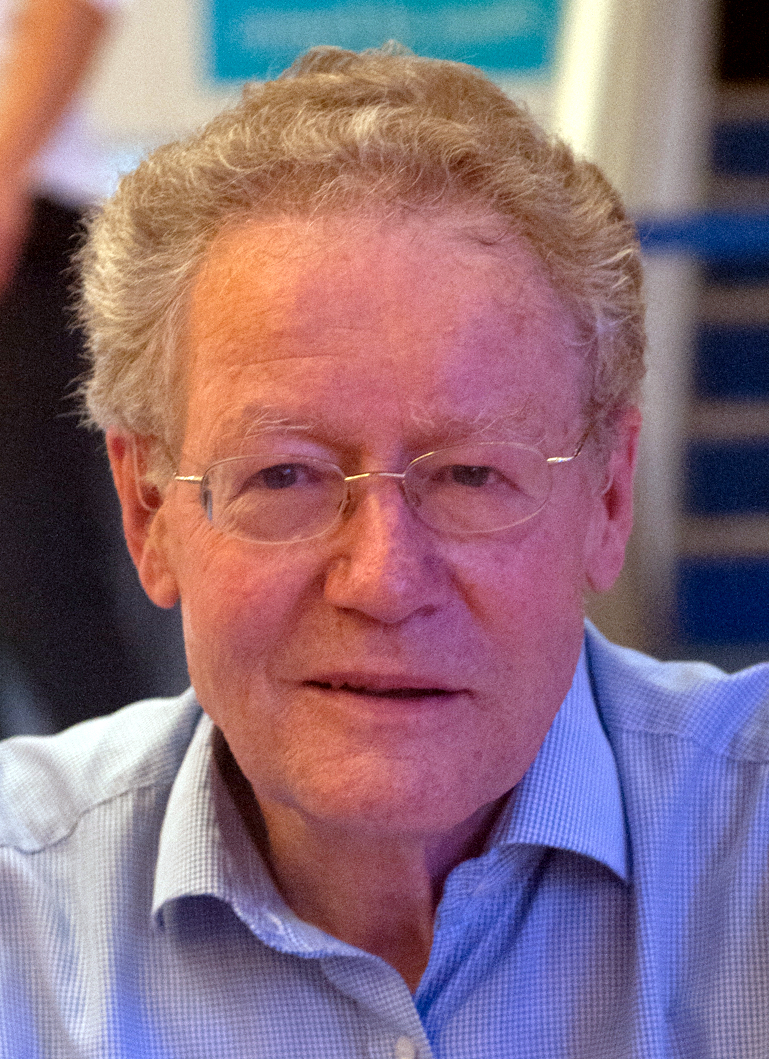
- Adam in 2015

Personal details
- Born: 1 March 1942 (age 84) Wuppertal, Germany
- Party: Alternative for Germany (2013–2021); Christian Democratic Union (before 2013)
- Education: University of Tübingen; LMU Munich; Kiel University

Konrad Adam (born 1 March 1942 in Wuppertal) is a German journalist, publicist and former politician who co-founded the Alternative for Germany party. He served as one of three federal spokesmen for the party until 2015.

== Biography ==
=== Early life and career ===
Adam was born in Wuppertal in 1942. His father was a lawyer and a railway official who was associated with the George-Kreis group. After graduating from high school in the 1960s, he studied history, philosophy and law at the University of Tübingen and LMU Munich before completing post-doctoral studies in law at the Kiel University and passed the state entrance exam for law in Kiel. He worked as an editor for the Deutsche Presse-Agentur before joining the editorial board of Frankfurter Allgemeine Zeitung from 1979 to 2000 and was a columnist for Die Welt before retiring in 2007.

In his journalistic commentary, Adam argued that the welfare state had played a role in declining birth rates among Germans. He also expressed criticism of Islam prior to the 9/11 attacks and argued multicultural policies in Europe were partly to blame for facilitating Islamic radicalism.

Since 2019, Adam has been chairman of the non-partisan Herbert Gruhl Society think-tank and a board member of the Desiderius-Erasmus-Stiftung foundation.

=== Political activities ===
Adam was a member of the Christian Democratic Union for many years and was part of the conservative Berlin Circle within the party. He left the CDU and became a founding member of the eurosceptic Electoral Alternative 2013 which subsequently became the Alternative for Germany. Adam was elected as one of three federal leaders for the party alongside Bernd Lucke and Frauke Petry and served in this role until 2015 when Lucke assumed full leadership of the party.

Adam was considered part of the national conservative faction closer to Frauke Petry's ideas within the AfD during internal divisions in 2015, but at the same time he issued an internal warning against the party shifting towards radical positions and said the AfD should reject extremism. He was threatened with suspension from the party by the AfD Hochtaunus district association for going against the party.

In 2020, Adam announced he would leave the AfD in the new year stating that he no longer felt at home in the party. In an interview with Swiss newspaper Neue Zürcher Zeitung Adam said he had initially remained silent and refrained from publicly criticising the party after stepping down as a federal leader in 2015 but blamed his former party colleague Alexander Gauland for leading the AfD in a more extremist direction.
