= Norbert Kleinwächter =

German politician (born 1986)

Member of the Bundestag
- Incumbent
- Assumed office 2017

Personal details
- Born: 22 February 1986 (age 40) Augsburg, West Germany
- Party: AfD

Norbert Kleinwächter (born 22 February 1986) is a German politician. Born in Augsburg, Bavaria, he represents Alternative for Germany (AfD). Norbert Kleinwächter has served as a member of the Bundestag from the state of Brandenburg since 2017. Kleinwächter is deputy Chairman of the AfD parliamentary group since 2021.

== Political career ==
From 2005 to 2007 Kleinwächter was a member of the Labor & Social Justice Party - The Electoral Alternative. He has been a member of the AfD since 2013 where he is considered to belong to a moderate faction. In 2014 he became a member of the Dahme-Spreewald district association and chairman of its AfD parliamentary group. After the 2017 general election, he became a member of the German Bundestag via the Brandenburg state list and the Committee on European Union Affairs.

Norbert Kleinwaechter has been on the board of the Franco-German Parliamentary Assembly since 2019 and serves as a permanent member of the German delegation to the Council of Europe.
