= Kai Arzheimer =

German academic

Dr Kai Arzheimer
- Born: 1969 (age 56–57)
- Occupation: Professor
- Employer: University of Mainz
- Website: kai-arzheimer.com

Kai Arzheimer (born 1969) is a German professor of Political Science at the University of Mainz. Previously, he was a lecturer in German and West European Politics at the Department of Government of the University of Essex. In 2017–2018, he held the Hannah Arendt Visiting Chair in German and European Studies at the Munk School of Global Affairs and Public Policy at the University of Toronto.

Arzheimer works in the field of quantitative Political sociology and Political behaviour. His area focus is Western Europe, and he is chiefly interested in right-wing extremism and (radical) right-wing populism. Arzheimer also writes on attitudes towards religion, secularism, and morality policies.

== Selected publications ==
- Arzheimer, Kai and Theresa Bernemann. “‘Place’ Does Matter for Populist Radical Right Sentiment, but How? Evidence from Germany.” European Political Science Review (2023): 1–20. doi:10.1017/S1755773923000279
- Arzheimer, Kai and Carl Berning. “How the Alternative for Germany (AfD) and Their Voters Veered to the Radical Right, 2013-2017.” Electoral Studies 60 (2019) doi:10.1016/j.electstud.2019.04.004
- Arzheimer, Kai. “‘Don’t mention the war!’ How populist right-wing radicalism became (almost) normal in Germany.” Journal of Common Market Studies 57 (2019): 90–102. doi:10.1111/jcms.12920
- Arzheimer, Kai. “Explaining Electoral Support for the Radical Right.” The Oxford Handbook of the Radical Right:. Ed. Rydgren, Jens. Oxford University Press, 2018. 143–165. doi:10.1093/oxfordhb/9780190274559.013.8
- Arzheimer, Kai, Jocelyn Evans, and Michael Lewis-Beck (Eds). The SAGE Handbook of Electoral Behaviour. Los Angeles: Sage, 2017.
- Evans, Jocelyn, Kai Arzheimer, Rosie Campbell, and Philip Cowley. “Candidate Localness and Voter Choice in the 2015 General Election in England.” Political Geography 59 (2017): 61–71. doi:10.1016/j.polgeo.2017.02.009
- Arzheimer, Kai. “The AfD: Finally a Successful Right-Wing Populist Eurosceptic Party for Germany?” West European Politics 38 (2015): 535–556. doi:10.1080/01402382.2015.1004230
- Arzheimer, Kai. Strukturgleichungsmodelle. Eine anwendungsorientierte Einführung. Wiesbaden: Springer VS, 2015. doi:10.1007/978-3-658-09609-0
- Arzheimer, Kai and Jocelyn Evans. “Geolocation and voting: candidate-voter distance effects on party choice in the 2010 General Election in England.” Political Geography 31 (2012): 301–310. doi:10.1016/j.polgeo.2012.04.006
- Arzheimer, Kai. “Working Class Parties 2.0? Competition between Centre Left and Extreme Right Parties.” Class Politics and the Radical Right. Ed. Rydren, Jens. London, New York: Routledge, 2012. 75–90.
- Arzheimer, Kai. “Contextual Factors and the Extreme Right Vote in Western Europe, 1980–2002.” American Journal of Political Science 53 (2009): 259–275. doi:10.1111/j.1540-5907.2009.00369.x
- Arzheimer, Kai and Elisabeth Carter. “Christian Religiosity and Voting for West European Radical Right Parties.” West European Politics 32 (2009): 985–1011. doi:10.1080/01402380903065058
- Arzheimer, Kai. Die Wähler der extremen Rechten 1980–2002. Wiesbaden: VS Verlag für Sozialwissenschaften, 2008. doi:10.1007/978-3-531-91009-3
- Arzheimer, Kai and Jocelyn Evans (Eds). Electoral Behaviour Vol. I-IV. Sage Library of Political Science. Los Angeles: Sage, 2008.
- Arzheimer, Kai. “‘Dead Men Walking?’ Party Identification in Germany, 1977–2002.” Electoral Studies 25 (2006): 794–818. doi:10.1016/j.electstud.2006.01.004
- Arzheimer, Kai and Elisabeth Carter. “Political Opportunity Structures and Right-Wing Extremist Party Success.” European Journal of Political Research 45 (2006): 419–443. doi:10.1111/j.1475-6765.2006.00304.x
- Arzheimer, Kai. Politikverdrossenheit. Bedeutung, Verwendung und empirische Relevanz eines politikwissenschaftlichen Begriffes. Wiesbaden: Westdeutscher Verlag, 2002.
