= Guido Reil =

German politician

Guido Reil MEP
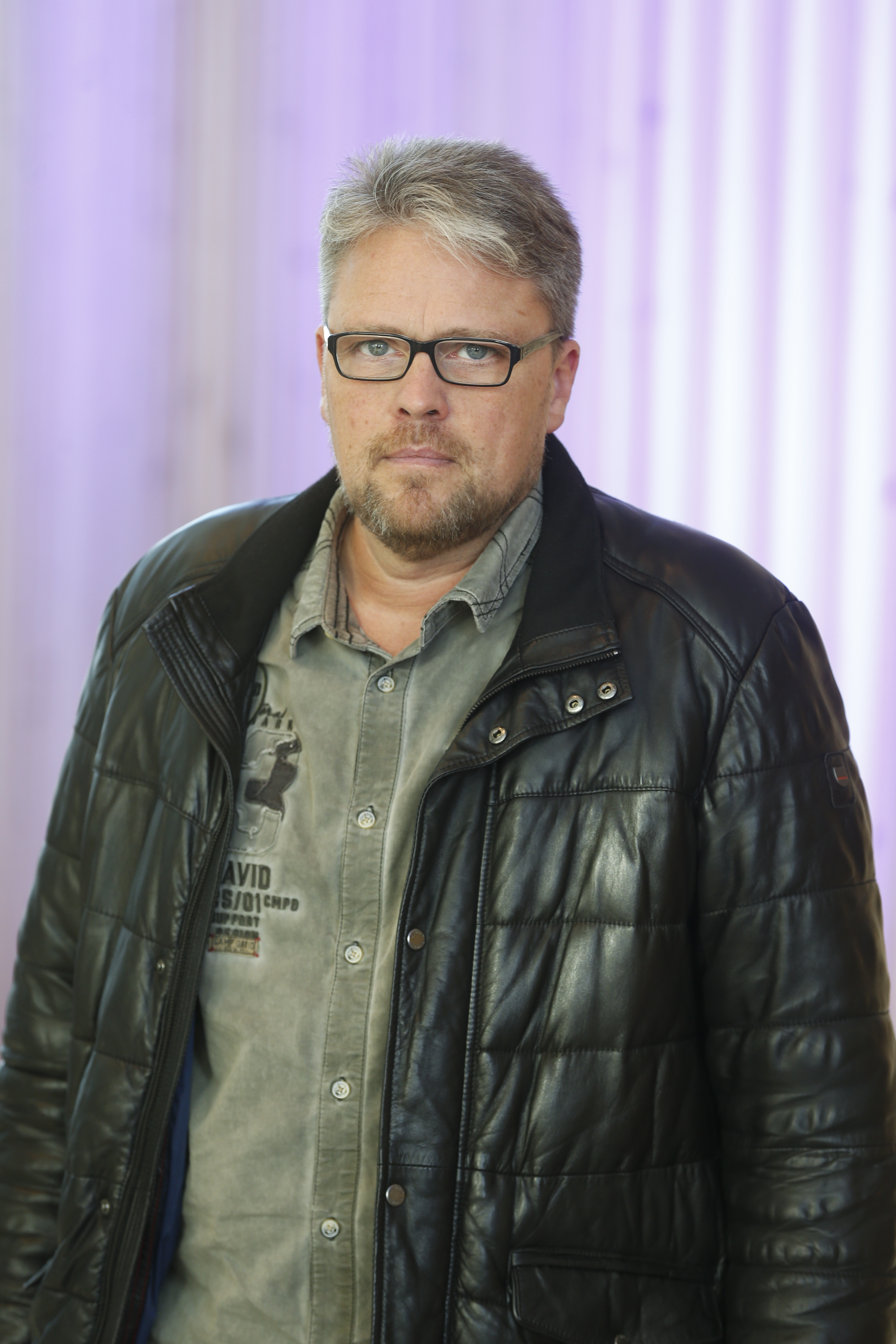

Member of the European Parliament for Germany
- Incumbent
- Assumed office 2 July 2019

Personal details
- Born: 19 January 1970 (age 56) Gelsenkirchen
- Party: Alternative for Germany (2016-present); Social Democratic Party of Germany (before 2016)

Guido Thorsten Reil (born January 19, 1970 in Gelsenkirchen) is a German politician who is serving as an Alternative for Germany Member of the European Parliament.

== Career ==
Reil grew up in a modest family and became a miner after leaving high school. He was a foreman at the Prosper-Haniel mine in Bottrop before training as a locksmith. Reil was also a union leader. He was a member of Social Democratic Party of Germany (SPD) for twenty six years and was elected as a councilor for the party in Essen in 2009. However, he withdrew his SPD membership in 2016 in protest at the party's immigration policies and disagreements with Essen's SPD chairman Thomas Kutschaty. As a member of the SPD, Reil had attended to organise a demonstration against the construction of a migrant centre in Essen, however, the then Prime Minister of North Rhine-Westphalia Hannelore Kraft intervened and got the event canceled.

Reil joined the AfD in 2016 and ran in the 2017 German federal election in the directly elected constituency of Essen II where he finished third and was not elected. In the 2019 European Parliament election he was elected as number 2 on the AfD's list behind Jörg Meuthen. Reil's campaigned focused on the "rescue of the Ruhr area" and preventing the European Union from taking more powers.

Following the Russian invasion of Ukraine, Reil visited Ukraine and declared solidarity with Ukraine, alongside MP Kay Gottschalk, comprising a minority in the otherwise pro-Russian AfD.
