= Nikolai Nerling =

German right-wing extremist

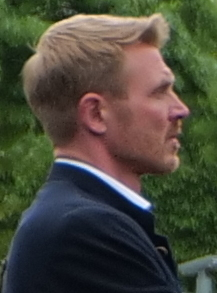
- Nerling in 2020
- Born: August 26, 1980 (age 45); Vastorf, Lower Saxony, Germany
- Occupations: right-wing extremist, anti-Semite, and Holocaust denier
- Known for: vlogging, hate speech

Nikolai Nerling (born 1980) is a German right-wing extremist, anti-Semite and Holocaust denier.

Since 2017, he has been spreading right-wing extremist ideology as a video blogger under the name "Der Volkslehrer". Nerling worked as a teacher at a primary school in Berlin until 2018, when he was fired for his right-wing extremist internet videos. Nerling's rhetoric is similar to that of the Reichsbürger movement. After he downplayed the Holocaust at the Dachau concentration camp memorial in December 2019, he was fined for Volksverhetzung.
