= Journal of Time Series Analysis =

- Discipline: Mathematical statistics
- Language: English
- Edited by: Robert Taylor

Publication details
- History: 1980–present
- Publisher: John Wiley & Sons
- Frequency: Bimonthly
- Impact factor: 1.2 (2025)

Standard abbreviations
- ISO 4: J. Time Ser. Anal.
- MathSciNet: J. Time Series Anal.

Indexing
- CODEN: JTSADL
- ISSN: 0143-9782 (print); 1467-9892 (web)
- LCCN: 82641445
- OCLC no.: 7831845577

Links
- Journal homepage; Online access; Online archive

The Journal of Time Series Analysis is a bimonthly peer-reviewed academic journal covering mathematical statistics as it relates to the analysis of time series data. It was established in 1980 and is published by John Wiley & Sons. The editor-in-chief is Robert Taylor (University of Essex). According to the Journal Citation Reports, the journal has a 2025 impact factor of 1.2, ranking it 96th out of 137 journals in the category "Mathematics, Interdisciplinary Applications" and 92nd out of 170 in the category "Statistics & Probability".
