= Publicly funded elections =

Elections funded with tax donations or tax revenue

A publicly funded election is an election funded with money collected through income tax donations or taxes as opposed to private or corporate-funded campaigns. In 1974, following the Watergate scandal, the U.S. Congress revised the Federal Election Campaign Act to create a voluntary public financing system for presidential campaigns. Candidates demonstrating grassroots support and agreeing to spending limits can opt for a mixed funding model in the primaries, which includes public matching funds for small donor contributions. Candidates can choose to receive full public funding for the general election, which prohibits private contributions, aiming to promote a fairer democracy and reduce the influence of corporate and private entities. Jurisdictions such as United Kingdom, Norway, India, Russia, Brazil, Nigeria, and Sweden have considered legislation that would create publicly funded elections.

== United States ==
Methods of publicly funded election legislation have been adopted in Colorado, Maine, Connecticut, Florida, Hawaii, Maryland, Michigan, Arizona, North Carolina, New Mexico, Wisconsin, Minnesota, Rhode Island, Vermont, Washington, West Virginia, and Massachusetts.

=== Court rulings and legality ===
Portions of Vermont system for publicly funding elections were found unconstitutional by the U.S. Supreme Court in its 2006 decision Randall v. Sorrell. In particular, state supplemental funds for publicly financed candidates whose opponents outspend them were struck down, while full funding of governor and lieutenant governor candidates remained in place.

Portions of Connecticut's statute were held unconstitutional in 2009, on the grounds that it unfairly discriminated against third party and independent candidates, but the core program of full funding of constitutional and legislative candidates remained in place. In July 2010 the U.S. Court of Appeals for the Second Circuit upheld portions of the district court's order but allowed the core program to continue.

In as part of the 2010 Citizens United v. FEC decision, U.S. Supreme Court defined money as a form of speech. A number of jurisdictions reacted by modifying existing laws or trying to pass new laws.

On June 27, 2011, ruling in the consolidated cases Arizona Free Enterprise Club's Freedom Club PAC v. Bennett and McComish v. Bennett, the Supreme Court deemed unconstitutional the matching-funds provision of the Arizona law.

=== States ===
Comprehensive public funding systems have been in effect in Arizona and Maine since 2000. In Maine, since enactment, approximately three quarters of state legislators have run their campaigns with government funds provided by the state program. In Arizona, a majority of the state house and both the Republican and Democratic candidates for governor ran publicly financed campaigns in 2006. There has not yet been a statewide election in Maine in which both the Republican and Democratic candidates were financed through the public financing system.

Massachusetts voters passed a Clean Elections Law by referendum in 1998, providing funding to candidates agreeing to limits and a maximum of $100 contributions. The people reversed this position a few years later, voting 74% against keeping publicly funded elections on 2002 Question 3, an advisory question. The law was repealed by the legislature as part of the 2003 state budget. The legislature had refused to fund the law, which prompted state courts to order the sale of a disused state hospital, state-owned automobiles, and desks and sofas in the offices of legislative leaders Thomas M. Finneran, Salvatore F. DiMasi, and Joseph F. Wagner.

In 2008, the California Fair Elections Act (AB583) passed the California Assembly and Senate and was signed by Governor Arnold Schwarzenegger. Because of the ban on publicly funded elections, the law had to be approved by voters in an initiative in June 2010. On June 8, 2010, California voters decided against the measure by 57% to 43%. An earlier Clean Elections ballot initiative that suggested funding elections with a business tax, Proposition 89 was also defeated in California in 2006, by 74% against to 26% in favor of a corporate tax to fund elections.

A Clean Elections ballot initiative in Alaska failed by a 64% to 35% margin in August 2008.

In 2013, North Carolina repealed its popular "Voter Owned Elections" program of public financing of judicial campaigns.

Wisconsin's 33 year old program was ended by the state legislature in 2011 by Governor Scott Walker and the legislature's joint finance committee.

In 2016, the California state legislature passed Senate Bill 1107, attempting to overturn the state's 1988 ban on publicly funding elections. However, state courts invalidated the law, as the original ban on public financing was a voter-approved constitutional amendment, and SB 1107 was a legislative act that, while passing the legislature with overwhelming support, was not put to California's ballot for voter approval. In 2025, the California Fair Elections Act of 2026 (SB 42) passed the California Assembly and Senate and was signed by Governor Newsom. SB 42 put Proposition 4 on the California 2026 ballot, for voters to decide on repealing the 1988 ban. California charter cities like San Francisco and Los Angeles are exempt from the ban and some already have some form of public financing.

=== Municipalities ===
Portland, Oregon's program was narrowly repealed by voters in a 2010 referendum.

Seattle voters approved the democracy voucher program in 2015, which gives city residents four $25 vouchers to donate to participating candidates. Since then, activists have pushed for democracy vouchers in other jurisdictions, arguing that the program would make political donors more reflective of the population, empower candidates to fundraise without relying on big donors, and decrease the influence of special interest groups over government.

Denver votes passed the Fair Elections Act in 2018. The law went into effect on January 1, 2020. The Fair Elections Act, which began as The Democracy For The People Initiative, has a public funding component that provides a 9-to-1 match on contributions up to $50 for candidates who opt-in and don't take any money other than contributions from individuals. It also included a ban on donations from business and unions, and lowered the amounts individuals could donate to candidates.

=== Federal legislation ===
In the US, SB 752, the Fair Elections Now Act, calling for publicly funded elections in U.S. Senate campaigns, was sponsored in the 111th Congress (2009–10) by Senators: Dick Durbin (D-IL) and Arlen Specter (D-PA). A companion bill, H.R. 1826, was introduced in the House, sponsored by John Larson (D-CT), Chellie Pingree (D-ME), and Walter Jones (R-NC). Unlike the Clean Elections laws in Maine and Arizona, H.R. 1826 did not include the "rescue funds" provision, perhaps due to concern about constitutionality in the wake of the Davis decision. Neither bill moved out of committee.

=== Clean elections systems ===
"Clean elections" is the name supporters have given to some public financing efforts, used most prominently in Maine and Arizona.

Some clean elections laws provide a government grant to candidates who agree to limit their spending and private fundraising. Candidates participating in a clean elections system are required to meet certain qualification criteria, which usually includes collecting a number of signatures and small contributions (generally determined by statute and set at $5 in both Maine and Arizona) before the candidate can receive public support. In most clean elections programs, these qualifying contributions must be given by constituents. To receive the government campaign grant, "Clean Candidates" must agree to forgo all other fundraising and accept no other private or personal funds. Candidates who choose not to participate are subject to limits on their fundraising, typically in the form of limits on the size of contributions they may accept and the sources of those contributions (such as limits on corporate or union contributions), and detailed reporting requirements.

In the US, in order to comply with Buckley v. Valeo, participation by candidates is not legally required. Originally, many clean elections programs provided that publicly financed candidates who were outspent by a privately funded candidate could receive additional funds (sometimes called "rescue funds") to match their privately funded opponent, up to a cap, with the intent of assuring that a candidate running with private funding would not outspend his government funded opponent. However, in Arizona Free Enterprise Club's Freedom Club PAC v. Bennett, the U.S. Supreme Court held that such "rescue fund" provisions unconstitutionally burdened the rights of speakers by intentionally limiting the effectiveness of their own speech. Thus since Bennett clean elections systems in the U.S. have been forced to abandon the "rescue funds" approach.

Clean election systems have been endorsed by individuals including U.S. Senator Bernie Sanders (I-VT), political candidate Andrew Yang, founder of the National Voting Rights Institute John Bonifaz, then-Illinois senator Barack Obama, and former-U.S. Senator John McCain (R-AZ).

== Brazil ==
In 2015, the Supreme Federal Court declared corporate donations to political parties and campaigns to be unconstitutional. Before the decision, electoral laws allowed companies to donate up to 2% of their previous year's gross revenue to candidates or party campaign funds, which totaled over 76% ($760m) of the donations on the 2014 election. The decision came as a response to corruption scandals and illegal donations, in the wake of the Operation Car Wash.

Since then, to cover the lack of private campaign finance, a public electoral fund was set up, to be divided among the parties based on their representation in the National Congress. Individuals can still make donations as a natural person, limited to 10% of their income in the previous year.

== See also ==
- Campaign finance reform in the United States
- Presidential election campaign fund checkoff
- Dark money
- Citizens United v. FEC
- Iron triangle
- Political finance, section on Regulation

Country-specific (International):

- Party funding in Austria
- Federal political financing in Canada
- Party finance in Germany
- Political funding in Ireland
- Party funding in Israel
- Political funding in Japan
- Party funding in the Netherlands
- Political funding in New Zealand
- Party finance in Sweden
- Political funding in the United Kingdom
- Political funding in Australia
