= Political party funding =

Term of political science

Political party funding is a method used by a political party to raise money for campaigns and routine activities. The funding of political parties is an aspect of campaign finance.

Political parties are funded by contributions from multiple sources. One of the largest sources of funding comes from party members and individual supporters through membership fees, subscriptions and small donations. This type of funding is often referred to as grassroots funding or support. Solicitation of larger donations from wealthy individuals, often referred to as plutocratic funding, is also a common method of securing funds. Parties can also be funded by organizations that share their political views, such as unions, political action committees, or organizations that seek to benefit from the party's policies. In certain locales, taxpayer money may be given to a party by the federal government. This is accomplished through state aid grants, government, or public funding. Additionally, political fundraising can occur via illegal means, such as influence peddling, graft, extortion, kickbacks and embezzlement.

== Donations and membership fees ==
Political parties may be given money by organizations, businesses, individual donors and special interest groups, such as trade unions. These groups may offer money or gifts to either the party or its leading members as incentives. When this happens with the goal of influencing the political stance or actions of the party, this is referred to as lobbying.

Since the second half of the 20th century, parties that typically relied upon donations or membership fees have been facing mounting problems. Increased scrutiny of donations and the long-term decline in party memberships in most western democracies are placing a greater strain on funding. For example, in the United Kingdom and Australia, membership of the two main parties in 2006 was less than an eighth of what it was in 1950, despite significant increases in population over the same period.

Straddling personal and public political funding, a U.S. public funding program allows taxpayers to direct $3 of their federal income tax to finance the qualified expenses of eligible presidential candidates. Rather than a contribution, the small individual donation constitutes a redirection of income tax owed without additional direct disbursement by taxpayers.

In some parties, such as the post-communist parties of France and Italy, or the Socialist parties in Ireland and the Netherlands, elected representatives take only the average industrial worker's wage from their salary as a representative, while the rest contributes to funding their party in general. Although these examples may now be rare, "rent-seeking" from incumbents continues to be a feature of some parties, such as in Nepal.

In the United Kingdom, it has been alleged that peerages have been awarded to party fund contributors, with benefactors becoming members of the House of Lords and thus in a position to participate in the legislative process. For instance, UK Prime minister David Lloyd George was found to have been selling peerages. To prevent similar future corruption, Parliament enacted the Honours (Prevention of Abuses) Act 1925, making the outright sale of peerages and similar benefits a criminal act. However, some benefactors are alleged to have attempted to circumvent this by disguising their contributions as loans, giving rise to the "Cash for Peerages" scandal.

Such activities, as well as assumed influence peddling, have given rise to demands for donation caps. As the costs of elections increase, so do the demands of party funds. In the UK, some politicians have advocated that parties be funded by the state, a proposal that promised to give rise to debate in the country that was first to regulate campaign expenses in 1883. However, no legislative action has followed the proposal.

== Public subsidies ==
Subsidies for party activity have been introduced in many countries. Public financing for parties and candidates is increasingly common. Germany, Sweden, Israel, Canada, Australia, Austria, and Spain are cases in point. More recently, France, Japan, Mexico, the Netherlands and Poland have followed suit.

There are two broad categories of public funding:

- Direct - entailing a monetary transfer to a party.
- Indirect - including broadcasting time on state media, use of the mail service, or supplies.

According to the comparative data from the ACE Electoral Knowledge Network, from a sample of over 180 nations, 25% of nations provide no direct or indirect public funding, 58% provide direct public funding, and 60% provide indirect public funding. Some countries provide both direct and indirect public funding to political parties.

Funding may be equal for all parties or dependent upon the results of previous elections or the number of candidates participating in an election. Frequently, parties rely on a mix of private and public funding and are required to disclose their finances to an election management body.

== Foreign aid ==
In fledgling democracies, funding can also be provided through foreign aid. International donors provide financial help to political parties in developing countries as a means to promote democracy and good governance, or, in some cases, to support preferred political parties. Support can be purely financial or otherwise. Frequently, support is provided in the form of capacity development activities, including the development of party manifestos, party constitutions, and campaigning skills.

The goal of all aid types is to provide development assistance at the international level to maintain a functioning global society. Major principles of modern forms of foreign aid were determined within the Marshall Plan, which aimed to support the reconstruction of Europe after World War II and the US Foreign Assistance Act of 1961. Developing ties between ideologically affiliated parties is another common feature of international support for a party. This can sometimes be perceived as direct support for the political aims of a political party, such as the support of the US government to the Georgian party behind the Rose Revolution.

Other donors work on a more neutral basis, where multiple donors provide grants in countries accessible by all parties for various purposes defined by the recipients. Some leading think-tanks like the Overseas Development Institute have called to increase support for political parties as part of developing the capacity to deal with the demands of interest-driven donors to improve governance.

== Foreign interference ==
Concerns have been raised over less overt interventions in national political party funding made by foreign governments as it impugns the reputation of nation-states on the world stage; the topic remains controversial and fiercely debated and defended.

In August 2021, a lawsuit charged the former fundraiser of the United States Republican Party, Elliot Broidy, accountable for accepting funds worth millions of dollars from the government of the United Arab Emirates. The funding was allegedly aimed at executing a smear campaign against the State of Qatar, a then-rival of the UAE, and influencing the US foreign policy.

== By country ==
- Political funding in Australia
- Party funding in Austria
- Federal political financing in Canada
- Funding of European political parties
- Party finance in Germany
- Political funding in Japan
- Party funding in the Netherlands
- Political funding in New Zealand
- Party finance in Sweden
- Political funding in the United Kingdom
- Campaign finance in the United States

== See also ==
- Follow the money
- Insider trading
- Political corruption
- Party political foundation
- Revolving door (politics)
- Slush fund

== Books ==
- Alexander, Herbert E., and Shiratori, Rei (eds.), Comparative political finance among the democracies. Boulder, CO: Westview Press, 1994.
- Austin, Reginald, and Maja Tjernström (eds.), Funding of political parties and election campaigns. Stockholm: International IDEA, 2003.
- Elin Falguera, Samuel Jones, Magnus Ohman (eds.), Funding of Political Parties and Election Campaigns: A Handbook on Political Finance. Stockholm: International IDEA, 2014.
- Gunlicks, Arthur B., Campaign and party finance in North America and Western Europe. Boulder, CO: Westview Press, 1993.
- Heard, Alexander, The Costs of Democracy. Chapel Hill NC: University of North Carolina Press, 1960.
- Nassmacher, Karl-Heinz: The Funding of Party Competition. Baden-Baden: Nomos Verlag, 2009.

== Articles ==
- Heard, Alexander, 'Political Financing'. In: Sills, David L. (ed.): International Encyclopedia of the Social Sciences, vol. 12, New York: Free Press – Macmillan, 1968, pp. 235–241.
- Nassmacher, Karl-Heinz, 'Party Finance'. In: Kurian, George T. et al. (eds.), The encyclopedia of political science, vol 4, Washington, DC: CQ Press, 2011, pp. 1187–1189.
- Paltiel, Khayyam Z., 'Campaign Finance. Contrasting Practices and Reforms'. In: Butler, David et al. (eds.), Democracy at the polls. A Comparative Study of competitive national elections. Washington, DC: AEI, 1981, pp. 138–172.
- Paltiel, Khayyam Z., 'Political Finance'. In: Bogdanor, Vernon (ed.), The Blackwell Encyclopedia of Political Institutions. Oxford, UK: Blackwell, 1987, pp. 454–456.
- Parello-Plesner, J., & Li, B. The Chinese Communist Party's Foreign Interference Operations: How the US and Other Democracies Should Respond. Hudson Institute, 2018.
- Pinto-Duschinsky, Michael, 'Party Finance'. In: Badie, Bertrand et al. (eds.), International Encyclopedia of Political Science. London: Sage, 2011.
- Tomz, M., & Weeks, J. L. Public opinion and foreign electoral intervention. American Political Science Review, 114(3), 2020, pp. 856–873.
