= Party subsidies =

Party subsidies or public funding of political parties are subsidies paid by the government directly to a political party to fund some or all of its political activities. Most democracies (in one way or the other) provide cash grants (state aid) from taxpayers' money, the general revenue fund, for party activity. Such funds may cover routine or campaign costs incurred by the party. Among the established democracies the United States, Switzerland and India are the most notable exceptions. Party subsidies can be relatively small (as in the U.K.) or quite generous (as in Sweden, Israel and Japan). In the U.S., the Presidential Fund takes money from the general fund only after authorized by a statement indicated upon a taxpayer's tax return.

The recipients of public support (in cash or kind) are party organizations, parliamentary groups (party caucuses) and/ or candidates for public office (parliament or presidency). In combination with rules that enforce fair access to and fair distribution of state aid among the players of the political game, government funding for political activity can be an acceptable policy option for democratic polities. The allocation of party subsidies follows general rules for access to and distribution of such grant, for example access for all parties represented in the national parliament and distribution in proportion to the number of seats held in the current parliament, or in proportion to the number of votes polled in the most recent election. Many subsidy schemes are linked to reporting and disclosure obligations for the recipient parties.

Rare instruments of party subsidies are matching funds and tax credits. Matching funds are granted to a political competitor who has proven to a government authority that he or she solicited small individual donations. Tax credits can be deducted by the taxpayer from tax liability because some part of a political donation is treated like an advance payment on tax. Because matching funds and tax credits depend on financial contributions by individual citizens such support is more compatible with a participatory concept of democracy than flat grants, which do not require specific efforts by the fundraising parties (or candidates).

In many democracies public funding for political parties was introduced after scandals, which revealed political corruption or illegal funding, had become public knowledge. In other countries, the rising costs of political competition stimulated the spread of party subsidies (government funding).

Although the mainstream opinion is in favour of party subsidies now, they are still disputed. Supporters of party subsidies argue that directly providing the campaign funds reduces political corruption, as parties do not need to raise "money with an opinion/ strings attached".

== History ==
In 1954 Costa Rica and Uruguay were the first countries to introduce party subsidies. They were followed by Puerto Rico in 1957 and West Germany in 1959. In the 1960s, Quebec (1963), Sweden (1965), Finland (1967) and Israel (1969) parties received such support.

Since the 1970s, party subsidies have been introduced by Norway (1970), Canada and Italy (1974), Austria (1975), the U.S. (1976), Australia (1984), Denmark (1986), France (1988), Belgium (1989), Japan (1994), Ireland (1997), the Netherlands (1999), the U.K. (2000) and New Zealand (2010). Nowadays it is also used in Greece, Portugal, Spain and other more recently established democracies in Europe and Latin America: India and Switzerland stand out as exceptions.

In Italy, following the abolition of the state financing of political parties, clear examples are initiatives of Prime Minister Matteo Renzi who organized on 6 and 7 November 2014, two fund-raising dinners, held respectively in Rome and Milan, for the Italian Democratic Party.

== Criticism ==
Critics argue that party subsidies:

- make parties less accountable to their supporters, because they have less of a need to solicit donations,
- petrify the party system and thereby lock the democratic process, because subsidies are distributed based on prior election results and not on current voter attitudes,
- make the formation or electoral participation of new parties more difficult, because such parties do not receive public funding right from the start and occasionally private funding is prohibited.

== See also ==
- Political finance
- Political party funding
- Political funding in Australia
- Party funding in Austria
- Federal political financing in Canada
- Party finance in Germany
- Political funding in Ireland
- Political funding in Japan
- Party funding in the Netherlands
- Political funding in New Zealand
- Party finance in Sweden
