= Party funding in Austria =

Ways political parties access revenue in Austria

Party funding in Austria has been subject to public regulation and public subsidies since 1975. Although the demarcation between campaign financing and routine activities due to overlapping election cycles and "permanent campaigning" is quite difficult, Austrian law has for a long time provided for separate subsidies from the federal budget. So have done the nine states of the Austrian federation and some municipalities.

== Sources of party funds ==
In the final quarter of the 20th century the overall income of Austrian parties has rested on two major and two minor pillars. Up to 1975 membership fees, donations and assessments of officeholder ("party taxes" in Austrian parlance) had been the three sources of political funding. The 1970s added public subsidies as another major source of revenue. During the 1990s about 900,000 signed up party members contributed 15 to 25 per cent of the parties' annual income. Trade unions and business donors added 10 to 13 per cent. "Party taxes" collected 10 to 14 per cent and subsidies from local, state and federal taxpayers provided the final 48 to 64 per cent.

== Level and items of spending ==
Up to 2013 the annual reports of Austrian parties include revenue and expenses for the federal level only. Including the state parties Sickinger has estimated that the total amount available to Austrian parties was ATS 309 (=US-$22) per registered voter in 1988, ATS 375 (=US-$27 in 1993 and ATS 413 (=US-$29) in 1998. Such spending is among the highest for established liberal democracies. In 2012/13, two leading Austrian newspapers reported that party spending in Austria was the second highest in the world. With Austrian parties annual routine spending (on operational costs of a full-time party organization) has always been more important than extra campaign expenses. During the early 1990s, total campaign spending for all levels claimed about one sixth of the major parties' (SPÖ and ÖVP) and one fifth of the minor parties (FPÖ, Greens) overall budgets.

== Regulation of political money ==
The regulation imposed by the Parties Act of 1975 had been rather loose and very liberal. There were no limits on party spending, neither by total amount nor by specific item, neither for campaign expenses nor for routine spending. Moreover, there was no statutory limit for political contributions by individual or corporate donors. However, there were practical restrictions, among others an income tax surcharge on political donations by organized interests to be paid by the recipient party and some kind of disclosure of large donations. This rather lackadaisical approach towards control of political finance has been criticized by academics (especially the lack of transparency) for many years and by GRECO reports (e.g. the lack of limits) more recently.

In December 2011 the Council of Europe's Group of States against corruption (GRECO) has recommended to Austria "to ensure that the future legislation on the financing of political parties and election campaigns provides for adequate accounting standards" and "to ensure that the future legislation ... requires the consolidation of party accounts and annual financial statements so as to include all territorial sections of the parties and other entities under their control". Following this advice, in 2012 Austrian legislation has addressed a variety of issues and has caught up to the German level of regulation. Concerning some issues even new areas (sponsoring, spending limits) have been entered. In a Compliance Report (adopted on 28 March 2014), however, GRECO has stated that it "is pleased to see that Austria has come a long way". Nonetheless GRECO feels that of 11 recommendations only four have been implemented satisfactorily. Five recommendations were partly implemented and two have not been implemented.

== See also ==
- Political finance
- Political party funding
- Party subsidies
- Party political foundation
- Campaign finance

== Bibliography ==
- Müller, Wolfgang C./ Hartmann, Martin: 'Finanzen im Dunkeln: Aspekte der Parteienfinanzierung'. In: Gerlich, Peter and Müller, Wolfgang C. (eds.): Zwischen Koalition und Proporz. Österreichs Parteien seit 1945, Wien: Braumüller, 1983, pp. 249–279.
- Klee-Kruse, Gudrun: 'Financing Parties and Elections in Small European Democracies. Austria and Sweden'. In: Gunlicks, Arthur B. (ed.); Campaign and Party Finance in North America and Western Europe, Boulder CO: Westview Press, 1993, pp. 178–200.
- Müller, Wolfgang C.: 'The Development of Austrian Party Organizations in the Post-war Period'. In: Katz, Richard S. and Mair, Peter (eds.): How Parties Organize. Change and Adaptation in Party Organizations in Western Democracies, London et al.: Sage Publications, 1994, pp. 53–68.
- Sickinger, Hubert: 'Parteien- und Wahlkampffinanzierung in den 90er Jahren'. In: Fritz Plasser et al. (eds.), Das österreichische Wahlverhalten, Vienna: Böhlau Verlag, 2000, pp. 305–331.
- Sickinger, Hubert: Politikfinanzierung in Österreich. 1st ed., Thaur et al.: Druck- und Verlagshaus, 1997; 2nd ed., Vienna: Czernin Verlag, 2009.
- Sickinger, Hubert: 'Neue Regeln für die Parteienfinanzierung'. In: Österreichisches Jahrbuch für Politik 2012, ed. by Andreas Khol et al., Vienna et al.: Böhlau Verlag, 2013, pp. 273–288.
