= Chinese Public Opinion Surveillance Net =

Defunct political website

- Website type: Civil anti-graft website
- Founded: October 1, 2003
- Dissolved: June 16, 2005
- Founder: Li Xinde
- Website: www.yuluncn.com

The Chinese Public Opinion Surveillance Net, or China Public Opinion Supervision Net, whose domain name was www.yuluncn.com, was a Mainland China-based anti-graft website founded by Li Xinde on October 1, 2003. The website was noted for revealing Li Xin, the then vice mayor of Jining, and Wang Yachen, the former mayor of Fuxin, Liaoning Province. The site was closed several times.

== Shut down ==
Chinese Public Opinion Surveillance Net was shut down on June 16, 2005. On January 7, 2021, Li Xinde was sentenced by the Chinese authorities to five years in prison for "illegal business operation".
