= Basira Paigham =

Afghan activist

- Born: 1997/1998; Afghanistan
- Occupation: LGBTQ-rights activist
- Known for: LGBTQ activism in Afghanistan
- Awards: BBC 100 Women

Basira Paigham (born 1997/1998) is an Afghan LGBTQ-rights activist.

== Life and activism ==
In 2015, Paigham began anonymously using social media to connect with other LGBTQ individuals in Afghanistan. In 2016, she created a Facebook group specifically for LGBT Afghans. In 2018, Paigham and some of her fellow activists organized community meet-ups in Kabul, as well as organizing mutual aid for fellow LGBT Afghans. During this time, Paigham also spoke with international groups and journalists under a pseudonym about her life as an LGBTQ person living in Afghanistan. She also gained some notability domestically as a women's rights activist.

In 2021, in the days after the Taliban claimed power, Paigham began receiving threatening phone calls from unknown numbers, and her apartment was searched. In October 2021 she obtained a visa to enter Pakistan, and from there she fled to Ireland. Paigham was recognized by the BBC as one of the 100 most influential women of the year; at the time, she was living in an Irish refugee camp in Dungarvan. While living in the refugee camp, she began working with refugee children to engage them in positive and community-focused activities. Following the BBC's recognition, some parents began preventing their children from meeting with Paigham, "fearing she would teach them about homosexuality", and Paigham faced harassment on social media. In Afghanistan, her family was targeted by the Taliban; her father and brother were detained for two weeks in February 2022 and accused of "fostering a homosexual girl and supporting Western values against Islam and Afghanistan". A few weeks later, her mother was beaten by neighbors.

Paigham began working as a hospital cleaner, sending money back to her family to finance a move to a larger city in Afghanistan.

Paigham was a keynote speaker at the Friedrich Naumann Foundation for Freedom's 2022 Born With Pride Conference. In 2023, she was made a UN Rights and Religion Fellow of Outright International.

== Personal life ==
Paigham is a lesbian and queer. She has said that her family is unsupportive of her sexuality.
