= Political funding in Australia =

Political parties in Australia are partially publicly funded, to reduce the influence of private money upon elections, and subsequently, the influence of private money upon the shaping of public policy. After each election, the Australian Electoral Commission distributes a set amount of money to each political party, per vote received. For example, after the 2013 election, political parties and candidates received $58.1 million in election funding. The Liberal Party received $23.9 million in public funds, as part of the Coalition total of $27.2 million, while the Labor Party received $20.8 million.

In Australia, the majority of private political donations come in the form of donations from corporations, which go towards the funding of the parties' election advertising campaigns. Donations and affiliation fees from trade unions also play a big role, and to a lesser extent donations from individuals. Donations occasionally take the form of non-cash donations, referred to as gifts-in-kind.

The Australian Electoral Commission (AEC) monitors donations to political parties, and publishes a yearly list of political donors. In practice, it is not difficult for donors to make undisclosed donations to political parties in Australia; for example, donors can sometimes hide their identities behind associated entities.

In 2025 the Albanese Government introduced a series of reforms, taking effect from 1 July 2026. These include caps on campaign spending and political donations, increased public funding, a lower disclosure threshold and faster disclosure requirements. The reforms were not in effect for the 2025 election but will affect the next election.

On 1 July 2025, the state of South Australia became the first place in the world to ban most political donations, implementing in its place a system of public funding.

== Corporate political donations ==
Between the years 1995–1998, corporations donated $29 million to Australian political parties. The largest corporate donor during this period was Westpac. By the year 2002–2003, the amount of corporate funding to Australian political parties had risen to $69.4 million. In 2004–2005, the Labor Party raised $64.8 million from both the corporate sector and public funding, while the Liberal Party raised over $66 million. Most of the large corporate donors conduct business in an area greatly affected by government policy, or are likely to benefit from government contracts.

=== Corporate fundraising ===
In Australia, there is a growing trend for MPs to become directly involved in the corporate fundraising efforts of their parties. Ministers and staff are enlisted to engage with donors and business supporters, with the aim of raising funds for their political parties. It is known for business leaders to pay $1,400 to get near a federal minister.

When political parties lodge their return to the AEC, they are not required to identify the corporations which attended party fundraising events. This allows companies to deny they are political donors.

=== Other corporate funding ===
Corporations may contribute to political funding in a variety of ways. For example, they may pay a corporate fee to attend party conferences.

== Individual donations ==
The UK's Michael Ashcroft become a significant figure in Australian politics, having been identified as the single largest individual donor to any Australian political party during the 2004–05 financial year. The Australian Electoral Commission reported in February 2006 that Ashcroft (who gave his address as "House of Lords, Westminster, London") had donated $1 million to the Liberal Party in September 2004, shortly before the 2004 federal election. It was, at the time, the biggest single private donation in Australian political history.

In 2010, Graeme Wood gave a political donation of A$1.6 million to the Greens.

== Trade union political funding ==
The Australian Labor Party is the main beneficiary of trade union affiliation fees, special levies and donations. The Labor Party received $49.68 million from trade unions in 2004/05. Critics have accused the unions of buying seats at ALP state conferences. In 2001/02, money from trade unions amounted to 11.85% of the Labor Party's income.

In the 2013 Election, the Construction, Forestry, Maritime, Mining and Energy Union CFMEU donated $50,000 to the Greens party in the ACT.

In the leadup to the 2018 Victorian Election the Electrical Trades Union of Australia donated $50,000 towards the Victorian Socialists.

In November 2019, the ETU ceased donations to the federal Labor party over Anthony Albanese's Federal Labor Opposition supporting free trade agreements.

== Gun lobby political donations ==
A 2019 report revealed that Katter's Australian Party has taken more than $808,760 from pro-gun groups during the 2011–2018 period. The party received the most disclosed pro-gun donations of all Australian political parties.

The same report found that the Shooters, Fishers and Farmers Party had received approximately $700,000 in political donations from pro-gun groups, and that the Liberal Democratic Party (Australia) had received political donations of $37,311 from pro-gun groups between July 2011 and March 2019.

== Public funding for political parties ==
In 1984, the Hawke government introduced public funding for political parties, with the intention that it would reduce the parties' reliance on corporate donations. To be eligible for public funding a political party needs to be registered with the Australian Electoral Commission under the Commonwealth Electoral Act 1918. A candidate or Senate group is eligible for election funding if they obtain at least 4% of the first preference vote in the division or the state or territory they contested.

The amount payable is calculated by multiplying the number of first preference (i.e., primary) votes received by the rate of payment applicable at the time. The rate is indexed every six months in line with increases in the Consumer Price Index. At the time of the 1984 election the rate was 61.2 cents for the House of Representatives and 30.6 cents for the Senate. That amount was based on the cost of a standard 30¢ postage stamp per elector per year. By the 1996 election, the rate was set at $1.58 per vote for both Houses. By the 2013 election the rate was $2.49. At 1 January 2014 the rate was $2.52 per vote. By the 2016 election, the election funding rate from 1 July 2016 to 31 December 2016 was $2.62784 per eligible vote.

As a result of the 2013 election, political parties and candidates received $58.1 million in election funding. The Liberal Party received $23.9 million in public funds, as part of the Coalition total of $27.2 million, while the Labor Party received $20.8 million. When public funding was introduced in 1984, the amount paid was $12 million. For the 1996 election, the total public funding had increased to $32.2 million, and was $41.9 million for the 2004 election. In 2016, $62.7 million was distributed. New rules for the 2019 election include that parties need to provide evidence of electoral spending to the AEC, and their potential public funding is capped in relation to their electoral spending: they cannot receive more public funding than they spent.

In February 2025, Parliament passed the Electoral Legislation Amendment (Electoral Reform) Act 2025 which lowered the disclosure threshold to $5,000, introduced real-time disclosures of donations, the new act also increased the amount election funding from $3.427 to $5 at an indexed rate.

== Disclosure of political donations ==
At the time of introducing public funding for political parties in 1984, the Hawke government also introduced a requirement for public disclosure of political donations. The threshold amount was set at $1,500. The disclosure scheme was introduced to increase overall transparency and inform the public about the financial dealings of political parties, candidates and others involved in the electoral process.

In May 2006, the Howard government increased the disclosure threshold to $10,000, which is then increased six-monthly by the consumer price index. Critics of the change claimed the new law would increase the chances of corruption, by making political donations harder to track, and by making conflicts of interest harder to detect. The change allowed corporations to secretly donate up to $90,000 spread across the national and the eight state/territory branches of political parties without public disclosure of that funding. In 2007, the Commonwealth Parliamentary Library estimated this disclosure change will increase the number of non-disclosed political donations from 25% to 36%.

Since 2006, the donations limit has increased by $200 or $300 each year so that by 2014 the threshold was $12,400, and $13,200 for 2016/17 (and applicable to the 2016 federal election). This meant that in 2014 up to $111,600 could be donated to a political party from a donor without disclosure, if donations are spread across the national and the eight state/territory branches.

In February 2017, then-Prime Minister Turnbull confirmed he had personally donated $1.75 million to the Liberal Party's election campaign for the 2016 federal election.

Another way of getting around the donation disclosure limits is for donations to be channelled through more than one entity or individuals.

== Tax deductibility ==
Until 2006, $100 of political donations could be claimed as a tax deduction for income tax purposes. In 2006, the Howard government increased the deductible amount to $1,500. The disclosure rules for political parties require them to characterise receipts as either "donations" or "other receipts". Most receipts are in fact marked as "other receipts", indicating that they have been structured in such a way as not to be treated as a political donation, which is subject to the tax deductibility limit. Such a device may, for example, be an exorbitantly priced lunch or dinner, or structured as a business meeting with a minister, or it may be an expensive advertisement in an association's magazine. The profits of the entity providing such "services" then flow to the associated political party.

== Associated entities ==
Despite the AEC publishing a yearly list of political donors, it is often difficult to ascertain who made the donation, as political parties sometimes use associated entities as front organisations to hide the source of donations.

Front organisations provide individuals and corporations a means of passing funds to the major parties anonymously or to avoid the tax deductibility limits of political donations. The Cormack Foundation is one such an organisation which raises funds for the Liberal Party, while John Curtin House Limited does the same for the Labor Party. Under the Commonwealth Electoral Act 1918, these organisations are not required to disclose where its funds come from. Associated entities have become major conduits for political donations in Australia, in 2003–2004 donating $72.6 million to political parties.

Some candidates have their own fundraising entities. Malcolm Turnbull has the Wentworth Forum run by the Wentworth Federal Electoral Conference (or FEC), which Turnbull claims ceased operations in 2009. The North Sydney Forum is a campaign fundraising body run by the North Sydney Federal Electoral Conference (FEC). While Joe Hockey was Treasurer of Australia, a member of the Forum was rewarded with private meetings with Hockey in return for annual fees of up to $22,000. Such entities do not make funding disclosures to the AEC as an associated entity of a political party, instead being structured as a funding entity for a particular candidate. Payments made by "members" are not treated as donations, instead being treated as membership fees or fees for services provided. There are many such fundraising entities not disclosed to the AEC or the public, including Enterprise Victoria, Free Enterprise Foundation and Greenfields Foundation. The Fadden Forum is a fundraising entity of the Queensland Liberal National Party controlled by MP Stuart Robert. Another similar entity said to occupy a "grey area" is the Conservative Leadership Foundation, set up in 2009 by Senator Cory Bernardi in Adelaide, South Australia.

An associated entity called Millennium Forum raised political donations for the NSW branch of the Liberal Party. In public hearings at the NSW corruption inquiry, ICAC, it was alleged that senior Liberal Party officials used the Millennium Forum and another Liberal-linked entity, the Free Enterprise Foundation, to funnel prohibited donations, including from property developers, into the 2011 NSW election campaign. It was alleged that donations prohibited under NSW law were instead made to the Free Enterprise Foundation, a federal body. The Free Enterprise Foundation would then donate to the NSW Liberals' state campaign. Now discredited, the Millennium Forum was replaced by the new Federal Forum for the same purpose. It has also been alleged that Mafia figures donated tens of thousands of dollars to the Millennium Forum, as part of an ultimately successful campaign to allow a known criminal to stay in Australia.

Another type of associated entities are so-called think tanks, such as the Menzies Research Centre, the H.R. Nicholls Society and Institute of Public Affairs which contribute to policy development.

== Service companies ==
It was revealed before the 2016 federal election that each Liberal MP pays a company called Parakeelia $2,500 a year from their taxpayer-funded office allowances to use software that collates constituent information. In fact, Parakeelia is a Liberal Party-controlled entity all of whose profit flows to the party. The structure, described by some commentators as a rort, made the entity the party's second-largest single source of revenue in 2014-15. Parakeelia paid $500,000 to the Liberal Party in 2015.

Unlike the Liberals, Labor has contracted an external private provider, Magenta Linas, to perform the same function, but there is no flow back to the party.

== Criticism of political donations ==
The Australian Shareholders Association has called for political donating to end, arguing that the donations are a gift and a form of bribery.

Former Qantas chief, John Menadue, said:

Corporate donations are a major threat to our political and democratic system, whether it be state governments fawning before property developers, the Prime Minister providing ethanol subsidies to a party donor, or the immigration minister using his visa clientele to tap into ethnic money.

Political researchers Sally Young and Joo-Cheong Tham from the Australian National University concluded:

There is inadequate transparency of funding. Moreover, there is a grave risk of corruption as undue influence due to corporate contributions and the sale of political access.

Some critics say Australia should follow the example of the United Kingdom, where corporate donors must disclose their political donations in the company's annual report to shareholders.

Other critics have called for limits to cap the amount that corporations and unions can donate to political parties, similar to the $5000 personal donation limit in Canada, with a virtual ban on union and corporate donations. Some point to the success New Zealand has had, limiting the amount of money that political parties can spend on their election campaigns.

In January 2008, New South Wales Opposition Leader Barry O'Farrell demanded political donations be limited to $30,000 per candidate, and a cap of $250,000 on what a corporation or union can donate to a political party. Describing the NSW government of Morris Iemma, O'Farrell said: "This is a Government where many people are of the view donations buy influence and decisions. That's why we need to take action to clean up the system."

Under a proposal launched by Shadow Federal Treasurer Malcolm Turnbull in January 2008, only individuals who are Australian citizens or on the Electoral Roll would be eligible to donate to political parties, and must declare the money came from their own funds. Turnbull said that the democratic system was not working properly when there is such a disparity between the amount of political donations a government can raise compared to the opposition.

In June 2017, a joint Fairfax-Four Corners investigation into Chinese attempts to influence Australian political parties exposed that the Australian Security Intelligence Organisation briefed both major parties about receiving campaign contributions from Chinese billionaires. These briefings were ignored and both political parties continued to accept donations from people in question. The Director-General of ASIO, Duncan Lewis, stated that Chinese political donors could be channels to advance Beijing's interests. In response to the allegations, Malcolm Turnbull ordered an inquiry into espionage and foreign interference laws. In December 2017, opposition MP Sam Dastyari resigned under pressure from a political scandal where he was accused of going against the Australian government's policy on the South China Sea as well as accusations of accepting financial favors from Chinese companies. Shortly afterwards, the Coalition government announced plans to ban foreign donations to Australian political parties and activist groups. This was a remarkable turn of events as Australia historically had no restrictions on political donations from outside of the country.

== State political donations ==
=== New South Wales ===
The New South Wales government is the seventh biggest advertiser in Australia, ahead of McDonald's and Coca-Cola.

On 30 October 2006, former Prime Minister Paul Keating called for an end to political donations from property developers. He said that in NSW, property developers were sending a "wall of money" towards the planning minister.

In September 2007, the Independent Commission Against Corruption cited political donations as a risk for corruption. The ICAC recommended that the state premier make changes to the Election Funding Act to force property developers to publicly disclose any donations made to the minister for planning, or the minister's political party. The ICAC also recommended that local government councillors step aside from any development applications involving political donors.

On 27 June 2007, the New South Wales Legislative Council established a committee to investigate electoral and political party funding. Critics have said the inquiry will be a toothless tiger, due to it being stacked with government-friendly members.

On 14 September 2011, a radical bill was tabled by Premier Barry O'Farrell which would ban any donations from corporations, unions or other organisations; only individuals would be permitted to donate, up to a cap of one thousand dollars. The bill was passed on 16 February 2012. This act was later repealed by, and replaced by, the Electoral Funding Act 2018, which reinstated the ability of Australian business entities to make donations, and increased the donations caps imposed on individuals and entities.

=== Victoria ===
In Victoria during the year 2001–2002, the Victorian Labor Party received $7.2 million in political donations, with trade unions, gaming companies and property developers on the list of donors. In the same year, the Victorian Liberals received $11.3 million in political funding, including $3.8 million in public funding.

Former Victorian premier, John Cain, presented a speech on political donors:

All of them want access and, some would say, favours. We seem to have accepted this situation provided that the donation, the giver and receiver are known; that is, that disclosure is the key.

But the driver is hunger for money by the parties. Despite public funding in the Commonwealth and some states, this hunger explains the drive only in part. Donors want the parties (and so, governments) to be beholden to them and to be preferred over their business competitors. It is a neat, cosy arrangement. It grows more blatant.

The parties in Australia now openly call for donations that provide access at rates of $10,000 to the Prime Minister or premier. It costs less to get to see a minister.

Parties are like football clubs – no matter how much money they get, they will spend it and then want more.

Former Victorian auditor-general Ches Baragwanath said it is naive to believe that political donors don't expect favours in return for their money.

=== South Australia ===
In 2024, the South Australian Parliament banned political donations to parties, candidates, members of Parliament, and third parties. The Electoral (Accountability and Integrity) Amendment Act 2024 came into effect on 1 July 2025, having passed Parliament with the support of Labor, Liberal, the Greens, and most independents. Instead, parties and individuals will receive public funding, which includes administrative funding for political parties limited to non-political use, advanced funding for parties participating in elections, and policy development funding of up to $20,000 a year (indexed with inflation) to eligible parties. Non-incumbent candidates and newly registered political parties are exempt from the ban on donations and can access advanced payment to help with campaign expenses, in order to reduce barriers for new entrants into the political system.. Parties and Candidates have a combined expenditure cap of $100,000 per candidate. Third party groups, including businesses, trade unions, and think tanks, have an expenditure cap of $450,000 during an election campaign.

Candidates will receive funding based on the number of votes received at the previous general election, subject to whether or not they are affiliated with a registered political party, and whether or not that party has representation in Parliament. Candidates endorsed by a party with Parliamentary representation will receive $5.50 per vote, while candidates of parties with no members of Parliament at the time of dissolution will receive $6 per vote for the first 10% of total primary votes, and $5.50 for each vote thereafter. Incumbent independent candidates will receive $8.50 per vote, while non-incumbent independent candidates would receive $9 per vote up until 10% of total primary votes, and $8.50 per vote thereafter.

The new laws were welcomed by the Centre for Public Integrity, who believe that laws "gets the balance right". Public policy think tank The Australia Institute argued that the changes could lead to a less democratic system, stating that the vast majority of funding would go to the major parties and would make it harder for new entrants to campaign against incumbents. Independent Federal Senator David Pocock also opposed the legislation, calling it "a major party stitch-up that subverts parliamentary process and seeks to lock out more community independents."

== See also ==
- Campaign finance
- Political finance
- Political party funding
- Party subsidies

== Other sources ==
- Colin A. Hughes: Fifty years of campaign finance study in Australia, Democratic Audit of Australia, Discussion Paper no. 35 of December 2006 <>
- Iain McMenamin: Business, Politics and Money in Australia: Testing Economic, Political and Ideological Explanations, Working Papers in International Studies, no. 4 of 2008, Centre for International Studies, Dublin City University <http://www.dcu.ie>
- Graeme Orr: The Law of Politics. Elections, Parties and Money in Australia, Sydney: Federation Press, 2nd edition, 2019.
- Iain McMenamin: If Money Talks, What Does It Say? Corruption and Business Financing of Political Parties, Oxford: Oxford University Press, 2013.
