= Desiderius Erasmus Foundation =

German political foundation

- Abbreviation: DES
- Chair: Erika Steinbach
- Website: erasmus-stiftung.de

The Desiderius Erasmus Foundation (German: Desiderius-Erasmus-Stiftung e.V.) is a German political party foundation associated with, but independent of, the far-right Alternative for Germany (AfD) party. The foundation's headquarters are located in Berlin. Its current chairwoman is the former Christian-democratic politician Erika Steinbach who joined the AfD in January 2022.

== Establishment and mission ==
The DES was registered in November 2017 in Lübeck. It was converted into a federal foundation from a foundation in the state of Schleswig-Holstein that had been established two years earlier.

It is named after the Dutch Renaissance humanistic Christian thinker and writer Erasmus of Rotterdam. This provoked ironic comments as the AfD has been extremely critical of the European Union and the Euro currency since its foundation in 2013 by the economist Bernd Lucke. "The name stands for a pro-European but Eurosceptic position of the party", a party spokesperson explained in 2015. The first chairman of the DES was publicist and politician Konrad Adam.

Before the Desiderius Erasmus Foundation became the AfD's sole official party foundation, there was fierce competition among similar foundations. Former party chairman Alexander Gauland preferred to have a foundation named after former Foreign Minister and Chancellor Gustav Stresemann, though this was prohibited by Gustav Stresemann's family members, not wanting the name Stresemann being misused. Early supporter of the DES was Alice Weidel, the party leader in the Bundestag. Other competitors were a "Friedrich Friesen Foundation" and "Johann Gottfried Herder Organization for Democracy".

In April 2018, the national board of the party decided to accept the association of the Erasmus Foundation. The party convention in June 2018 held a vote and a two thirds majority agreed to adopt the DES as officially associated foundation.

The DES describes its mission as providing civic-democratic political educational programs and the promotion of science and scholarly education.

In accordance with AfD political orientation, the DES has a right-wing orientation. It has held several conferences and political seminars.

In June 2019 they held a large public conference in Berlin on the "growing threats to freedom of speech". Among the speakers were the party chairman Jörg Meuthen, Member of the European Parliament, the media scientist Norbert Bolz and the former East German civil rights activist and Neue Rechte politician Vera Lengsfeld. The speeches are documented in the first issue of the foundations journal Faktum.

== Leadership and board ==
Since March 2018, former MdB Erika Steinbach is president of the DES. She had left Angela Merkel's Christian Democratic Union party (CDU) in 2017 in protest over the chancellor's open door migration policy.

== Financing ==
DES finances their operations with private donations and membership fees.

In their party program, the AfD criticizes that the other parties represented in the Bundestag have given their affiliated foundations now more than 600 million Euro funding from the federal budget per year. This, they claim, is a breach of the Federal Constitutional Court’s cap on state financing for parties.

The newcomer party wants to limit state financing of parties and their foundations. Party chairman Alexander Gauland claimed it was his "political end goal" to abolish the system of state financed political foundations.

So far, the DES has not received public funds, since it is sitting in the German parliament, the Bundestag, only since 2017, one term. It is expected that the DES will get a share of the other party's foundations public financing if the AfD gets elected into the Bundestag a second time. In 2017 the German weekly newspaper Die Zeit estimated that the foundation could ultimately get as much as 80 million euros of public funds. Funding is likely to be substantially lower. After a first funding request of 1.4 million euros was rejected by the Ministry of the Interior, the foundation has started legal action.

According to a new law implemented in 2023, namely the Stiftungsfinanzierungsgesetz, the share of the total party foundating funding of all parties that goes towards the DES is based on previous election results. Additionally, a political party foundation must demonstrate that "overall" it serves the liberal democratic basic order (§7). Furthermore, not only the foundation itself must pass the law, but also its "broad political movement" (e.g. associated media, networks and people). If those requirements were met, the DES would receive 25 million Euros in funding.

Academics Markus Ogorek, chairman of the Institut für Öffentliches Recht (Institute for public law) and Rudolf Mellinghoff, a former judge of the German constitutional court argue that based on that law, sufficient reason would be provided to exclude the foundation from public funding. They argue that the "broad political movement" of the foundation is anticonstitutional.

== See also ==
- Friedrich Ebert Foundation (SPD)
- Friedrich Naumann Foundation for Freedom (FDP)
- Hanns Seidel Foundation (CSU)
- Heinrich Böll Foundation (Die Grünen)
- Konrad Adenauer Foundation (CDU)
- Rosa Luxemburg Foundation (Die Linke)
