= Friedrich Ebert Foundation =

German political foundation linked to the SDP

Friedrich-Ebert-Stiftung
- Abbreviation: FES
- Named after: Friedrich Ebert
- Founded: 1925; 101 years ago
- Founder: Konrad Ludwig
- Purpose: Education
- Location: Bonn, Germany
- Region served: Germany
- President: Martin Schulz
- Secretary general: Sabine Fandrych
- Affiliations: Social Democratic Party
- Website: fes.de

The Friedrich Ebert Foundation (German: Friedrich-Ebert-Stiftung e.V.; Abbreviation: FES) is a German political party foundation associated with, but independent from, the Social Democratic Party of Germany (SPD). Established in 1925 as the political legacy of Friedrich Ebert, Germany's first president, it is the largest and oldest of the German party-associated foundations. It is headquartered in Bonn and Berlin, and has offices and projects in over 100 countries. It is Germany's oldest organisation to promote democracy, political education, and promote students of outstanding intellectual abilities and personality.

== History ==
The Friedrich-Ebert-Stiftung (FES) was named after Friedrich Ebert (1871–1925), the Social Democratic President of Germany, 1919–1925. In his will, he specified that the proceeds from donations at his funeral should be used to create a foundation. The SPD chairman at the time, Konrad Ludwig, was given the responsibility of building this foundation, which he did a few days after Ebert's death in 1925. The main concern of the foundation was to work against discrimination of workers in the area of education: "The Friedrich Ebert Foundation pursues the goal of giving young, empowered proletarians government aid to fund an education at state-accredited institutions. As a basic principle, only those people who have a recommendation from the party organisation will receive funding." (SPD Yearbook 1926) By the end of 1931, 295 students had been funded with over 52,000 marks. At this point the funding of the foundation fell through, as a result of the Great Depression. The FES was a section of the Social Democratic Education and Culture Organisation, and was banned along with the party itself in 1933 by the Nazis.

In 1946, the FES was reinstituted at the founding assembly of the Socialist German Student Federation. In 1954, the FES was restructured into a charitable organisation "for the advancement of democratic education". This established the FES as an independent, self-contained institute. In addition to education programmes, the FES has also worked in the area of development aid since the 1960s. In this effort, it has supported democracy and freedom movements, for instance in the African National Congress (ANC), and played an important role in overcoming dictatorial regimes in Greece, Spain, and Portugal. As a case in point, the Socialist Party of Portugal was formed at an FES school in Bad Münstereifel, Germany.

In 2017, the Friedrich Ebert Foundation was attacked by a group dubbed "Pawn Storm", the same cyber spy group that targeted that year's campaign of French presidential candidate Emmanuel Macron; the group used email phishing tricks and attempted to install malware at the foundation.

The German state subsidized the work of the foundation with 170 million Euros in 2018.

In 2022, the Friedrich Ebert Foundation was barred from working in Russia. In March 2024, the Friedrich Ebert Foundation was declared an undesirable organization in Russia.

== Friedrich-Ebert-Stiftung Academic Foundation ==
The Friedrich-Ebert-Stiftung Academic Foundation is one of thirteen state-funded organizations for the promotion of young talents (Begabtenförderwerke) in Germany. Less than 1% of German students achieve a scholarship at one of the thirteen organizations (i.e. FES, Studienstiftung, Konrad Adenauer Foundation, Friedrich Naumann Foundation, Hanns Seidel Foundation, Heinrich Böll Foundation, Rosa Luxemburg Foundation, Cusanuswerk, Ernst Ludwig Ehrlich Scholarship Fund).

== Other activities ==
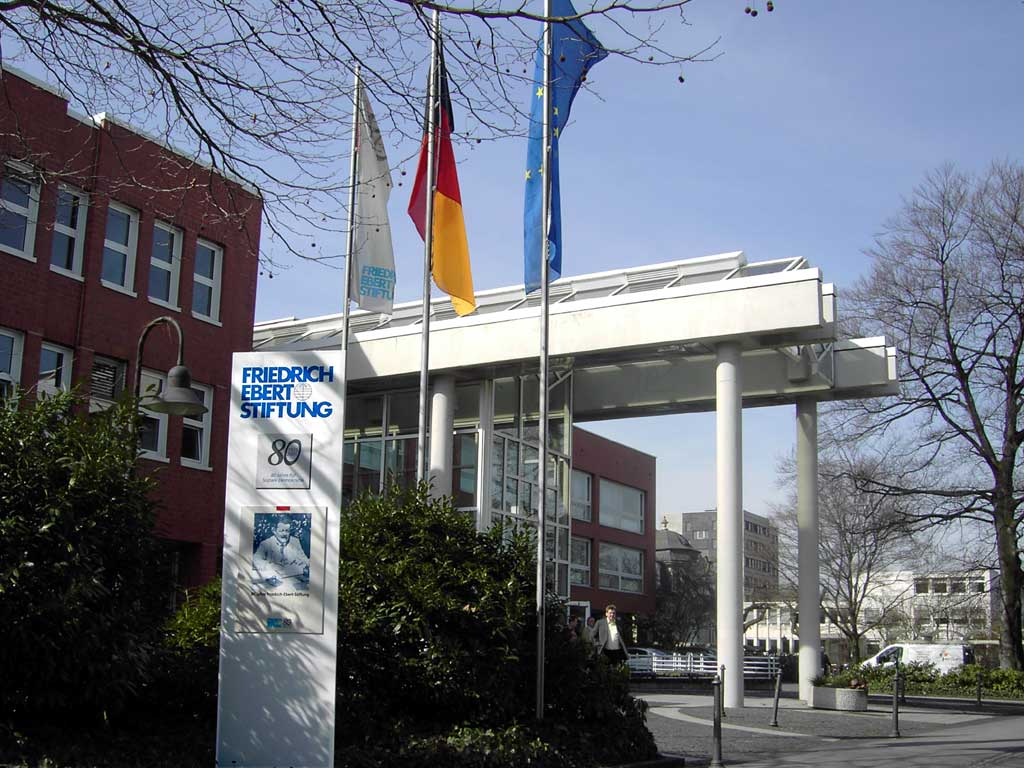
Friedrich Ebert Foundation in Bonn

Today, the Friedrich Ebert Foundation employs several hundred employees in their offices in Bonn and Berlin, as well as in 14 regional offices and an academy within Germany and in over 100 foreign agencies. It is financed mainly through grants from the federal budget and the budgets of the various Bundesländer.

The FES had its own conference center on the Venusberg in Bonn for these activities until its closure in 2009.

The historical research center of the foundation also contains the Archive of Social Democracy and its libraries in Bonn and at the Karl Marx House in Trier. This is one of the largest collections of documents on social history and the history of the workers movement.

== Prizes ==
Since 1982, the foundation has awarded a prize of 10,000 euro called Das politische Buch ("The Political Book") to promote noteworthy political books. The prize serves to remind people of the Nazi book burnings of 10 May 1933.

The Friedrich Ebert Foundation Human Rights Prize (FES-Menschenrechtspreis) has been awarded annually since 1994.

The Hans-Matthöfer-Preis für Wirtschaftspublicizistik (Hans Matthöfer Prize for Economic Journalism), named in honour of German economist and politician Hans Matthöfer, has been awarded since 2015 by the Hans-und-Traute-Matthöfer Foundation at the Friedrich Ebert Foundation. Since 2025, the prize has been awarded in two categories: one for a book and the other for a publication in other media (e.g. journal articles (print or online), blogs, podcasts, or video formats).

== Leadership ==
- 1953–1970: Gerhard Weisser
- 1970–1983: Alfred Nau
- 1983–1987: Heinz Kühn
- 1987–2003: Holger Börner (chairman laureate from 2003 until his death in 2006)
- 2003–2010: Anke Fuchs
- 2010–2012: Peter Struck
- 2013–2020: Kurt Beck and Dieter Schulte (interim since Struck's death)
- 2020–present: Martin Schulz

== See also ==
- Desiderius Erasmus Foundation (AfD)
- Friedrich Naumann Foundation for Freedom (FDP)
- Hanns Seidel Foundation (CSU)
- Heinrich Böll Foundation (Die Grünen)
- Konrad Adenauer Foundation (CDU)
- Rosa Luxemburg Foundation (Die Linke)
