= Arizona Free Enterprise Club's Freedom Club PAC v. Bennett =

- Supreme Court of the United States

Argued March 28, 2011 Decided June 27, 2011
- Full case name: Arizona Free Enterprise Club's Freedom Club PAC v. Ken Bennett, in his official capacity as Arizona Secretary of State, et al.
- Citations: 564 U.S. 721 (more) 131 S. Ct. 2806; 180 L. Ed. 2d 664

Case history
- Prior: McComish v. Bennett, 611 F.3d 510 (9th Cir. 2010); cert. granted, 562 U.S. 1060 (2010).
- Subsequent: McComish v. Bennett, 653 F.3d 1106 (9th Cir. 2011)

Holding
- Arizona's matching funds scheme substantially burdens political speech and is not sufficiently justified by a compelling interest to survive First Amendment scrutiny.

Court membership
- Chief Justice John Roberts Associate Justices Antonin Scalia · Anthony Kennedy; Clarence Thomas · Ruth Bader Ginsburg; Stephen Breyer · Samuel Alito; Sonia Sotomayor · Elena Kagan

Case opinions
- Majority: Roberts, joined by Scalia, Kennedy, Thomas, Alito
- Dissent: Kagan, joined by Ginsburg, Breyer, Sotomayor

Laws applied
- U.S. Const. amend. I

Arizona Free Enterprise Club's Freedom Club PAC v. Bennett, 564 U.S. 721 (2011), is a decision by the Supreme Court of the United States.

== Facts ==
In 1998, Arizona voters approved the ballot measure known as the Clean Elections Act. When it was passed, the Clean Elections law established public financing for candidates running for office. Candidates who choose to participate in the system must collect a specific number of five dollar donations. Under the law as passed, if a participating candidate is outspent by a non-participating opponent (including the opponent's expenditures of personal funds) the participating candidate receives government funds matching the money spent by the non-participating candidate, up to three times the original government subsidy. Independent expenditures by groups not coordinated with the candidate were also matched.

== Legal history ==
The plaintiffs filed a legal challenge against the Arizona Clean Elections Commission on August 21, 2008, in the United States District Court for the District of Arizona. According to the Plaintiffs, the Clean Elections system produced a chilling effect on speech because it "seeks to equalize funding." But advocates of the Clean Elections law argued that the system deters corruption because candidates do not have to cater to special interest groups.

In January 2010, the district court decided the matching funds provision violated the First Amendment and issued an injunction. District Court Judge Roslyn Silver agreed with the plaintiffs that the matching funds provision could not stand under Davis, although she referred to the result as "illogical" and referred to the holding in Davis as "an ipse dixit unsupported by the slightest veneer of reasoning to hide the obvious judicial fiat by which it is reached."

Silver suspended her order while the Arizona Clean Elections Commission appealed to the United States Court of Appeals for the Ninth Circuit. The case was heard by the Ninth Circuit Court on April 12, 2010. The Ninth Circuit reversed, holding that the matching funds provision of Arizona's law was analytically distinct from the millionaire's amendment.

Two years earlier the Supreme Court had decided, in Davis v. Federal Election Commission (2008), to strike down a provision of the Bipartisan Campaign Reform Act (BCRA) known as the Millionaire's Amendment that allowed candidates to raise campaign contributions at three times the normal contribution limit and receive unlimited coordinated party expenditures if their opponent spent over $350,000 of their own personal money.

Writing for the Court in Davis, Justice Samuel Alito said the burden the Millionaire's Amendment imposed on candidates was impermissible because "it attaches as a consequence of a statutorily imposed choice". In other words, the statute imposed a burden on candidates who did not limit expenditures of their personal wealth to $350,000.

The Supreme Court agreed to hear an appeal of McComish. (This case was consolidated with Arizona Free Enterprise Club Freedom Club PAC v. Bennett prior to consideration by the Supreme Court.) Oral arguments were heard March 28, 2011. On June 27, 2011, the Supreme Court reversed the Ninth Circuit Court of Appeals' ruling and declared matching funds schemes designed to "level the playing field" unconstitutional in a 5–4 decision.

== Supreme Court ==
The Court found the Clean Elections Act imposed a heavier burden on candidate speech than the Millionaire's Amendment because candidates benefiting from the Clean Elections Act received public funds automatically when their opponent spent money, even for uncoordinated expenditures made by independent groups. Candidates benefiting from the increased contribution limits in Davis still had to raise money from supporters. They did not receive public funds automatically based on an opponent's expenditures.

Independent expenditures have been constitutionally protected since Buckley v. Valeo and the Court found that the Clean Elections Act placed a burden on groups making protected independent expenditures by forcing them to choose between speaking about issues instead of candidates or triggering the matching funds provision.

== Case timeline ==
August 21, 2008: Case filed in U.S. District Court.

July 17, 2009: Deadline for opposition brief.

July 31, 2009: Deadline for reply brief.

August 7, 2009: Hearing deadline.

January 5, 2010: Plaintiffs file preliminary injunction asking Judge Roslyn O. Silver to stop the issuance of matching funds for the 2010 election.

January 15, 2010: Hearing on motions for summary judgment

January 20, 2010: Judge Silver strikes down Clean Elections as unconstitutional, but puts a stay on her order that allows for the state to appeal.

January 27, 2010: Plaintiffs ask 9th Circuit Court of Appeals to remove the stay and strike down the Matching Funds provision of Clean Elections immediately. It is refused.

February 3, 2010: Plaintiffs file emergency appeal to repeal the stay on Judge Silver's order with Supreme Court Justice Anthony Kennedy. The appeal is refused and gives the 9th Circuit until June 1 to rule on the appeal by the state.

May 21, 2010: 9th Circuit rules in favor of the state in appeal, saying that Clean Elections' Matching Funds is constitutional.

May 24, 2010: Plaintiffs file emergency motion to vacate the stay with the Supreme Court of the United States.

June 1, 2010: The Court refuses the stay request on the grounds that Goldwater must state, and had not stated, an intent to appeal the Ninth Circuit decision. Goldwater files a third application to lift stay adding its intent to appeal the 9th Circuit's decision.

June 8, 2010: The Supreme Court blocks the distribution of Clean Elections for 2010, removing the district court's stay.

August 17, 2010: Plaintiffs lawyers make formal appeal to the Supreme Court.

November 29, 2010: Supreme Court agrees to consider formal appeal.

March 28, 2011: Supreme Court is scheduled to hear oral arguments.

June 27, 2011: Supreme Court reverses Ninth Circuit Court of Appeals' ruling and declares matching funds unconstitutional.

== Sources ==
- Ansolabehere, Stephen (2011). "Ansolabehere S. Arizona Free Enterprise v. Bennett and the Problem of Campaign Finance . Supreme Court Review. 2011;2011 (1) :39-79". Supreme Court Review.
