= Party finance in Germany =

Subject of statutory reports

Party finance in Germany is the subject of statutory reports, which up to 35 parties file annually with the administration of the German parliament. Important questions pertaining to political party funding can be answered by analysing the data given in these financial reports: How much money is raised and spent by each party operating in Germany? What assets are at the disposal, which debts are on the books of German parties? For which purposes did parties spend their funds (during any calendar year since 1984)? From which itemized sources did a specific party collect its revenue (since 1968)? Who are the donors of major contributions (in excess of €10,000) and how much did each donor give during a specific calendar year?

As a consequence of Hitler's rise to power in 1933 political funding has been an issue of German politics since the postwar years. Political finance legislation started in 1967 and by 1983 was more comprehensive than other established democracies. Spending by German parties holds a medium-range position among democracies, old and new. German parties spend most of their funds on the routine operation of an impressive full-time organization, nationally and in the field. There are two major and two minor sources of revenue for German parties. On average public subsidies as well as membership dues each provide one third of all party income. The final third of total revenue is raised from donations and by assessment of incumbents, mostly in the municipalities.

By October each year political parties file a financial report for the previous calendar year with the administration of the federal parliament (Präsident des Deutschen Bundestages). These annual reports cover the whole party organization (headquarters, regional branches and local chapters). They are tabled as parliamentary papers and published by the speaker of the Bundestag without attracting much interest among the general public or the media. The data presented in the annual financial reports (Rechenschaftsberichte) of German parties cover the sources and the use of political funds as well as the financial situation (debts and assets) of each party. A list of the reports is available at the Bundestag website, and individual reports can be downloaded from there.

== Party spending ==
Spending by parties represented in the German parliament (in million €) 2011
| Party | Campaigning | General political activity | Routine operations | Staff (salaries and benefits) | Other expenses |
|---|---|---|---|---|---|
| CDU | 27.0 | 30.7 | 28.0 | 42.0 | 4.7 |
| SPD | 24.1 | 32.1 | 28.6 | 46.4 | 10.3 |
| FDP | 7.9 | 10.2 | 10.0 | 5.3 | 1.3 |
| Left Party | 4.5 | 6.9 | 5.0 | 10.2 | 0.2 |
| Green Party | 7.2 | 8.1 | 5.6 | 11.1 | 0.5 |
| CSU | 0.9 | 13.7 | 7.1 | 9.8 | 0.4 |
Source: Parliamentary paper (Bundestags-Drucksache) No. 17/12340

During the 2006–2009 election cycle, the six parties represented in the federal parliament (Bundestag) had an aggregate budget of €1.8 billion, an average of €450 million per calendar year. As in other democracies, spending in election years is higher than in non-election years. This means that in election years the two major parties (CDU/CSU and SPD) can spend about €200 million each, whereas four minor parties (The Greens, FDP, CSU, Die Linke) have annual budgets of about €40 million each.

The distribution of funds among the parties that elect federal MPs has stayed more or less stable for many years. Just one change is noteworthy: whereas at the turn of the century the financial means of the major parties were more balanced, recently the governing CDU/CSU has re-established its traditional lead in financial terms. The total outlay for up to 30 other parties that are not represented federally is less than 10 percent of the overall party expenses (as well as revenue). During the years 1984 to 1989, all German parties together spent a total of €5 to 7 per German citizen (person entitled to vote, voter on list). For 1991 to 2009, the annual aggregate per capita spending amounted to some €5 to 10. Taking the rate of creeping inflation into account, German parties have had a hard time to keep up their previous spending levels.

Compared with other democracies, the average outlay for all German parties is in a medium range among 18 nations. Parties in Austria, Israel, Italy, Japan and Mexico spend between two and three times the annual per capita amount of their German counterparts. Parties in Australia, Canada, Denmark, the Netherlands, the U.K. and the U.S. spend between a quarter and a half of the German average. As far as reliable data are available, this international rank order of party spending levels has been fairly stable during the second half of the 20th century.

The first item of party spending that comes to mind is election campaigns; a European may also recall that parties employ staff and run permanent offices "on the ground". Someone with an inside view of party activity may also think of conventions, meetings, mailings and other communication. In Germany, campaigns at all levels of the federal system (national, state and municipal) are run by parties rather than candidates. Nonetheless, over the whole election cycle campaign spending adds up to less than spending on staff, offices and internal communication. An important impact on this distribution among spending items is certainly caused by the fact that during a campaign for all states, the federal and the European Parliaments public networks provide free airtime on radio and TV to all competing parties.

German parties have estimated that less than 30 per cent of their total expenses are related to the use of media (billboards, advertising in newspapers and magazines, advertising with privately owned networks), which is quite important for campaign purposes. Even in 2009, a year with two nationwide elections (for the European and the federal parliaments), the six Bundestag parties spent between 41 and 50 percent of their total budgets on campaigning. Only the Bavarian wing of the Christian Democrats, the CSU, spent less (32 percent of its annual expenses).

In 2009, salaries and related benefits accounted for almost 23 percent of the total expenses of the parties that elected MPs. About 15 percent of the annual total expenses was operational spending for running a party organization on at least 3, sometimes 4 levels (national, regional, county and township). As a consequence, the party apparatus accounted for about 38 percent of total expenses (even in an election year). Among the minor parties, only the FDP (29 percent) spent less, The Greens and The Left (41 percent each) also spend above the average share—just to keep the party organization running.

== Political revenue ==
Revenues of parties represented in the German parliament (in million €) 2011
| Party | Membership dues | Public subsidies | Donations | Assessment of incumbents | Other revenue |
|---|---|---|---|---|---|
| CDU | 40.1 | 44.6 | 21.8 | 17.5 | 16.9 |
| SPD | 47.5 | 42.4 | 12.1 | 22.6 | 31.1 |
| FDP | 7.4 | 13.6 | 6.6 | 3.3 | 3.3 |
| Left Party | 9.7 | 12.1 | 1.9 | 3.9 | 1.0 |
| Green Party | 8.0 | 13.8 | 4.8 | 7.7 | 2.5 |
| CSU | 10.2 | 10.4 | 5.9 | 3.0 | 7.5 |
Source: Parliamentary paper (Bundestags-Drucksache) No. 17/12340

As in many other countries, the funds spent by political parties are raised via membership dues, individual and corporate donations and grants from the public purse (public subsidies). In 2009 (an election year), the SPD raised €173 million and the CDU €163 million. For CSU, The Greens, FDP and The Left, total revenues during the same year ranged between €27 and 43 million. A quick glance at the total revenue of the parties represented in the Bundestag reveals that a total of €128 million came from public subsidies and €121 million were dues paid by signed-up party members. Donations (from all sources) totalled €90 million and assessments from office-holders (mostly municipal councillors, but also state legislators, MPs and MEPs) added another €55 million.

Because the threshold for access to public subsidies (0.5 percent of the national vote) is quite low, about 20 different parties receive a cash grant from taxpayers' funds. However, more than 95 percent of the total grant (€133 million, absolute Obergrenze) goes to the six parties that are represented federally. About 85 to 90 percent of the revenue total raised by membership fees plus donations is less than €3,300 per donor and year. Since the 1970s, corporate donations have dramatically lost their previous importance. Four events or decisions may have been influential: (1) tax benefits for political donations were limited to individual donors and small amounts by Supreme Court (Bundesverfassungsgericht) ruling, (2) various scandals have raised awareness of parties, donors, media and the general public, (3) parties get reliable funding of their most important needs via public grants and (4) there is no need to "buy" access to politicians or influence peddling because sufficient non-financial channels for both types of lobbying are available.

Any attempt to assess the public share of all party funds may start with the parties' annual reports. The figures given there imply that in 2009 (an election year) some 27 percent of total party revenue officially came from public subsidies. During the election cycle 2005–09, direct subsidies to party organizations amounted to an average of almost 29 percent of total revenue. This has, however, to be supplemented by an indirect source of public funding, the assessments of office-holders to those who nominated them (e.g. transfers of a proportion of the salaries of members and their allowances to party coffers. The total of such "party taxes" adds up to about 10 percent of party income. This brings the public contribution to about 40 percent of total party funds. Another source of indirect public funding results from the tax benefits that people making party contributions (including membership dues and "party taxes") up to €3,300 per individual taxpayer and year can claim against their income tax liability. An estimated loss in public tax revenue of €100 million would add about 20 percentage points and increase the direct and indirect cash subsidies from the public purse to party organizations in Germany to some 60 percent of total party income.

Finally, a note of reservation is appropriate: the share of public funding elaborated in the previous paragraph includes only cash that flows into the coffers of the party organization proper (at all levels of the political system). Considerable public subsidies to parliamentary party groups (caucuses) in the federal, European and state parliaments as well as in municipal assemblies, funds for the operation of party political foundations (especially their activities within Germany), transfers to party youth associations and the allowances paid to MPs (for staff and constituency offices) are not included. Moreover, party election campaigns are supported by free airtime on radio and TV as well as billboards paid for by municipal authorities.

== Regulation ==
The current elements of the German political finance regime are regulated by article 21 of the Basic Law (Grundgesetz, i.e. the German constitution) and parts IV and V of the Political Parties Act.

Due to a constitutional provision (see below), German regulation of party finance is centred around transparency. Transparency has two aspects: annual reporting on all party funds (income, expenditure, debts and assets) and disclosure of donors' identity. Anyone (individual, business, organization) who gave more than an annual total of €10,000 to any party unit has to be included in the party's annual report. Donors of amounts in excess of €50,000 have to be disclosed more in a timely manner.

Starting in 1949 and elaborated in 1984 the German Basic Law has included provisions about the financial conduct of political parties that are not found in other written constitutions such as the U.S., Italy, and France: In 1949, when transparency of political funds was stipulated, this had been a completely new concept. In 1984, a constitutional amendment extended the provision of 1949 beyond sources of revenue to include expenses, debts and assets, too. Meanwhile, Section 24 of the Political Parties Act had established a practice of including all party units, not just federal headquarters but also regional branches and local chapters. Thus, today, financial reports in Germany provide the only set of comprehensive data on party funds in a modern democracy. (However, party reports do not include parliamentary groups, party political foundations and individual candidates.) For the quite rare public information on consolidated debts and assets of the major parties in Germany see Table: Debts and assets as at 31 December 2011 - in million €.

Debts and assets of major parties in Germany (as of 31 December 2011, in million €)
| Asset / Liability | CDU | SPD | FDP | Green Party | Left Party | CSU |
|---|---|---|---|---|---|---|
| Real estate | 50.8 | 112.5 | 3.7 | 10.6 | 4.8 | 10.1 |
| Cash at hand (bank accounts) | 95.4 | 83.9 | 11.4 | 21.0 | 12.0 | 35.8 |
| Other assets | 19.7 | 60.7 | 18.2 | 4.7 | 9.5 | 3.9 |
| Total assets | 165.9 | 257.1 | 33.3 | 36.3 | 26.3 | 49.8 |
| Bank loans | 33.8 | 42.3 | 14.2 | 4.8 | 0.0 | 4.2 |
| Other liabilities | 11.6 | 25.9 | 13.6 | 1.2 | 0.8 | 12.0 |
| Net reserves | 120.5 | 188.9 | 5.5 | 30.3 | 25.5 | 33.6 |
Source: Parliamentary paper (Bundestags-Drucksache) No. 17/12340

The other pillar of the German political finance regime is represented by the rules for public funding of political parties (not of candidates nominated by parties). Each year, a total of currently €150.8 million (absolute maximum, absolute Obergrenze) is distributed in direct public grants among eligible parties. Parties are eligible if they have polled more than 0.5 per cent of the vote in a nationwide election (Bundestag, European Parliament) or 1.0 per cent of the total valid votes for one of the 16 state legislatures (Landtag) during the current election cycle. The individual party's grant is distributed based on two criteria: for each vote polled in the most recent state, federal and European election the party is allocated 70 cents; each euro raised in small amounts during the previous year is matched by 38 cents of public money. However, no party's public grant may exceed the total amount of funds that it raised from "self-generated revenue", i.e.private sources (relative maximum, relative Obergrenze).

There is a variety of indirect subsidies, too. Among them are free airtime for campaign spots on all publicly owned and operated radio and TV networks as well as billboard space that is rented from commercial providers by municipal authorities and distributed for free among campaigning parties. Besides there are tax benefits for small and medium-sized political contributions (including donations, membership dues and assessments of office-holders. A 50 per cent tax credit of up to €825 per donor and year can be claimed against income tax liability for all donations up to €1,650. For donations up to €3,300 per donor and year a tax deduction (from taxable income) is available for the amount in excess of €1,650.

Apart from the prohibitions on foreign and anonymous contributions and a reference to cases of outright corruption (Einflußspenden), there are only two very specifically German prohibitions: parties are not allowed to accept any transfers from party groups in parliament (caucuses) and from political foundations. There are no contribution or spending limits. Statutory or other cost controls for campaigns, such as a limited time period, a spending limit or any other kind of limit, are unknown in Germany.

The only general limitation on party expenses is the ability to raise funds from private contributors. Due to a supreme court ruling (see below in History), public subsidies to a specific party may not exceed the "self-generated revenue", i.e. the total amount raised from signed-up members and other donors ("relative maximum", "relative Obergrenze"). Thus, a party that is unable to collect enough contributions from private sources will see its public subsidy reduced automatically and be unable to make all the expenditure that it would like to. Till now, only very small parties have been limited by this rule.

== History ==
When political scientists started to categorize political parties, they identified two different party types: cadre parties or mass parties, which had different origins (inside and outside parliament) as well as different fund-raising strategies. Bourgeois cadre parties relied on donations given by wealthy individuals. Mass parties of the working class raised the necessary funding by dues collected among large numbers of signed-up party members. German parties of the late 19th century were among the prime examples of this. The four major parties of the time all applied either of the respective models. Liberals and Conservatives raised campaign funds from wealthy donors, locally and nationally. Social Democrats collected membership dues to fund party staff, party offices, campaigns and party newspapers. The Catholic minority, which had its own mass party, the Centre Party, acted accordingly.

Shortly after 1900, two major innovations began to change this pattern of party funding in Germany. When, in 1906, the national parliament (Reichstag) started to pay salaries to all MPs, the workers' party (SPD) shifted the direction of transfers between party and MPs. In the old days, the party had paid for the support of its MPs. During the 20th century SPD (and later on other) MPs contributed towards the operational costs of their party (assessment of office-holders, tithing, "party tax").

In 1907, a more potent force in party funding, corporate donations, entered the political arena. The continuous rise of the SPD vote (despite the joint efforts of state oppression and social security legislation) triggered a wave of financial support for bourgeois parties. The democratic revolution of 1918 in Germany and the Bolshevik revolution (1917) in Russia reinforced the 'collectivist' political danger felt by the corporate world. An anti-collectivist effort got off the ground when leading industrialists from the coal and steel industries started to talk their peers into a joint effort.

The organizational setup for corporate donations established in 1907 was to stay for years to come and it was to be repeated after 1945: a group of leading industrialists assessed their corporate peers to contribute to a conveyor organization an amount based on a small quota and the number of workers employed. Initially the pattern was especially powerful among corporations of coal and steel production. Later on, tycoons from the electrical and chemical industries and even from the banking sector joined in. The funds collected in this manner from the leading corporations of German business by committees of top managers were distributed among conservative and liberal parties, initially the National Liberal Party (Germany) and the German Conservative Party. During the Weimar Republic especially the German Democratic Party (DDP), the German People's Party (DVP) and the German National People's Party (DNVP) received this kind of financial backing.

In the final years of the Weimar Republic (1932/33), industrialists no longer limited their financial support to democratic parties. Some extended their generosity even to the fascist NSDAP. One of them, Fritz Thyssen (the heir to a steel fortune), had supported that party for quite a while. Now he led his colleagues to fund Adolf Hitler's access to power.

As a consequence of German industry's role in Hitler's rise to power in the early 1930s, party finance became an issue of political discourse in Germany after 1945. The concept of transparency was discussed in the constitutional convention (Parlamentarischer Rat) in connection with a new article to be inserted into the constitution. As the assembly agreed, a transparent flow of funds into party coffers has been stipulated by the German constitution (Grundgesetz) ever since. Article 21 of the new post-war constitution, the Basic Law of the Federal Republic of Germany, stipulated in 1949 that "political parties must disclose the sources of their funds to the general public." However, between 1949 and 1966 this remained inconsequential because no legislative action provided for a binding schedule of party revenue to be revealed and a procedure for the disclosure of major donations.

Since 1959 the major parties felt more or less of a need to distribute public subsidies and in 1966 the supreme court (i.e. the Federal Constitutional Court, Bundesverfassungsgericht) had ruled that such funds could only be allocated to cover "the necessary costs of an adequate election campaign". This situation triggered federal legislation, the Political Parties Act of 1967. Among other subjects, the act covered both the rules for the transparency of party funding and those for the allocation of public subsidies. To this day, article 21 of the constitution and parts IV and V of the Political Parties Act are the legal basis for the flow of funds through party coffers, the German political finance regime. Finally, in 1984 a general format for the comprehensive reporting of income and expenditure, debts and assets by each party organization was implemented.

Challenges to the current legislation and occasional scandals (e.g. the influence-seeking donations by Friedrich Karl Flick, the slush funds of chancellor Helmut Kohl and the funds anonymously held in a foreign bank by the Hessian CDU state party) have helped to improve the political finance regime up to a point that is equalled by few older democracies. Other donations, which led to controversy (like the biggest CDU contribution ever by Mr. and Mrs. Ehlerding or donations to local SPD chapters in Cologne and Wuppertal and donations that FDP politician Möllemann solicited for his party), proved that the current rules can withstand such challenges. Each party involved had to face sanctions by the enforcement agency, the speaker of the federal parliament (Deutscher Bundestag), and by voters in elections that followed the specific scandal.

The supreme court ruling of 1958 ended a practice of tax benefits for plutocratic funding of parties by corporate donations. After a variety of circumventions, detours and legislative experiments, this principle was ultimately reinstated in 1992. In 1966 the supreme court (Bundesverfassungsgericht) attempted to limit the amount of public funding. However, the initial concept failed because tying subsidies to campaign spending turned out to be not working. A more recent ruling of 1992 allowed general subsidies but provided for two kinds of limitation: a matching provision and a maximum amount for direct state funding. The 1994 amendment to the Political Parties Act took care of all three provisions (relative maximum, absolute maximum for subsidies and no tax benefits for political contributions beyond €3,300 per individual and calendar year). Finally Sections 23b, 25 and 31d of the Political Parties Act 2002 tried to perfect the rules, especially by timely publication of large donations.

On 23 January 2024, the Federal Constitutional Court excluded the National Democratic Party of Germany (NPD) from party funding for six years, arguing that it continued to oppose the fundamental principles that are indispensable for the free democratic constitutional state and aimed to eliminate them.

== Sources ==
=== Books and articles ===
(1) Adams, Karl-Heinz, Parteienfinanzierung in Deutschland: Entwicklung der Einnahmenstrukturen politischer Parteien oder eine Sittengeschichten über Parteien, Geld und Macht. Marburg: Tectum Verlag, 2005. (in German only) ISBN 3-8288-8804-6

(2) von Arnim, Hans Herbert: Campaign and Party Finance in Germany. In: Gunlicks, Arthur B. (ed.), Campaign and Party Finance in North America and Western Europe, Boulder, CO: Westview Press, 1993, pp. 201–218 ISBN 0-8133-8290-4

(3) Boyken, Friedhelm: Die neue Parteienfinanzierung: Entscheidungsprozeßanalyse und Wirkungskontrolle. Baden-Baden: Nomos Verlag, 1998. (in German only) ISBN 3-7890-5483-6

(4) Dübber, Ulrich/ Braunthal, Gerhard: 'West Germany'. In: Journal of Politics, vol. 25, 1963, no. 4, pp. 774-789.

(5) Gunlicks, Arthur B, Campaign and Party Finance in the West German "Party State". In: Review of Politics, vol. 50, Winter 1988, pp. 30–48.

(6) Gunlicks, Arthur B, The Financing of German Political Parties. In: Merkl, Peter (ed.), The Federal Republic of Germany at Forty, New York, NY: University Press, 1989, pp. 228–248. ISBN 0-8147-5445-7

(7) Gunlicks, Arthur B, The New German Party Finance Law. In. German Politics, vol. 4, January 1995, pp. 101–121.

(8) Heidenheimer, Arnold J./ Langdon, Frank C.: Business Associations and the Financing of Political Parties. A Comparative Study of the Evaluation of Practices in Germany, Norway and Japan. The Hague: Marinus Nijhoff, 1968.

(9) Koß, Michael, The politics of party funding: state funding to political parties and party competition in western Europe. Oxford, UK: Oxford University Press, 2011. ISBN 0-19-957275-5

(10) Landfried, Christine, Political finance in West Germany. In: Alexander, Herbert E. and Shiratori, Rei (eds.), Comparative political finance among the democracies. Boulder, CO: Westview Press, 1994, pp. 133–144. ISBN 0-8133-8852-X

(11) Nassmacher, Karl-Heinz, Political finance in West Central Europe (Austria, Germany, Switzerland). In: Nassmacher, Karl-Heinz (ed.), Foundations for democracy: Essays in honor of Herbert E. Alexander. Baden-Baden: Nomos Verlag, 2001, pp. 92–111. ISBN 3-7890-7340-7

(12) Pinto-Duschinsky, Michael/ Schleth, Uwe: 'Why Public Subsidies Have Become a Major Source of Party Funds in West Germany, but Not in Great Britain'. In: Heidenheimer, Arnold J. (ed.): Comparative Political Finance. The Financing of Party Organizations and Election Campaigns. Lexington MA: D.C. Heath, 1970, pp. 23-49.

(13) Pinto-Duschinsky, Michael, The Party Foundations and Political Finance in Germany. In: Seidle, Leslie F. (ed.), Comparative Issues in Party and Election Finance. Toronto, ON: Dundurn Press, 1991, pp. 179–250. ISBN 1-55002-100-1

(14) Schleth, Uwe: Parteifinanzen. Eine Studie über Kosten und Finanzierung der Parteitätigkeit, zu deren Problematik und zu den Möglichkeiten der Reform. Meisenheim am Glan: Anton Hain, 1973.

=== External links ===
- Publications | International IDEA
- Publications | International IDEA
- 2003 Political Party Finance Database – International IDEA, Strömsborg, Sweden
- 2012 Political Party Finance Database – International IDEA, Strömsborg, Sweden
- Publications | International IDEA
- (in German only)
- Parteienfinanzierung in der Bewährung (in German only)
- RC20 - Political Finance and Political Corruption
