= Alfred Bayer =

German politician (1933–2026)

Alfred Bayer (8 March 1933 – 16 June 2026) was a German politician, who was a representative of the Christian Social Union of Bavaria.

== Life and career ==
Bayer was born in Munich on 8 March 1933. He graduated in economics from LMU Munich in 1957. From 1994 to 2004, he was the chairman of the Hanns Seidel Foundation. Bayer died in Munich on 16 June 2026, at the age of 93.

== See also ==
- List of Bavarian Christian Social Union politicians
