= Rosa Luxemburg Foundation =

German political think tank and lobby group

Rosa Luxemburg Foundation Rosa-Luxemburg-Stiftung

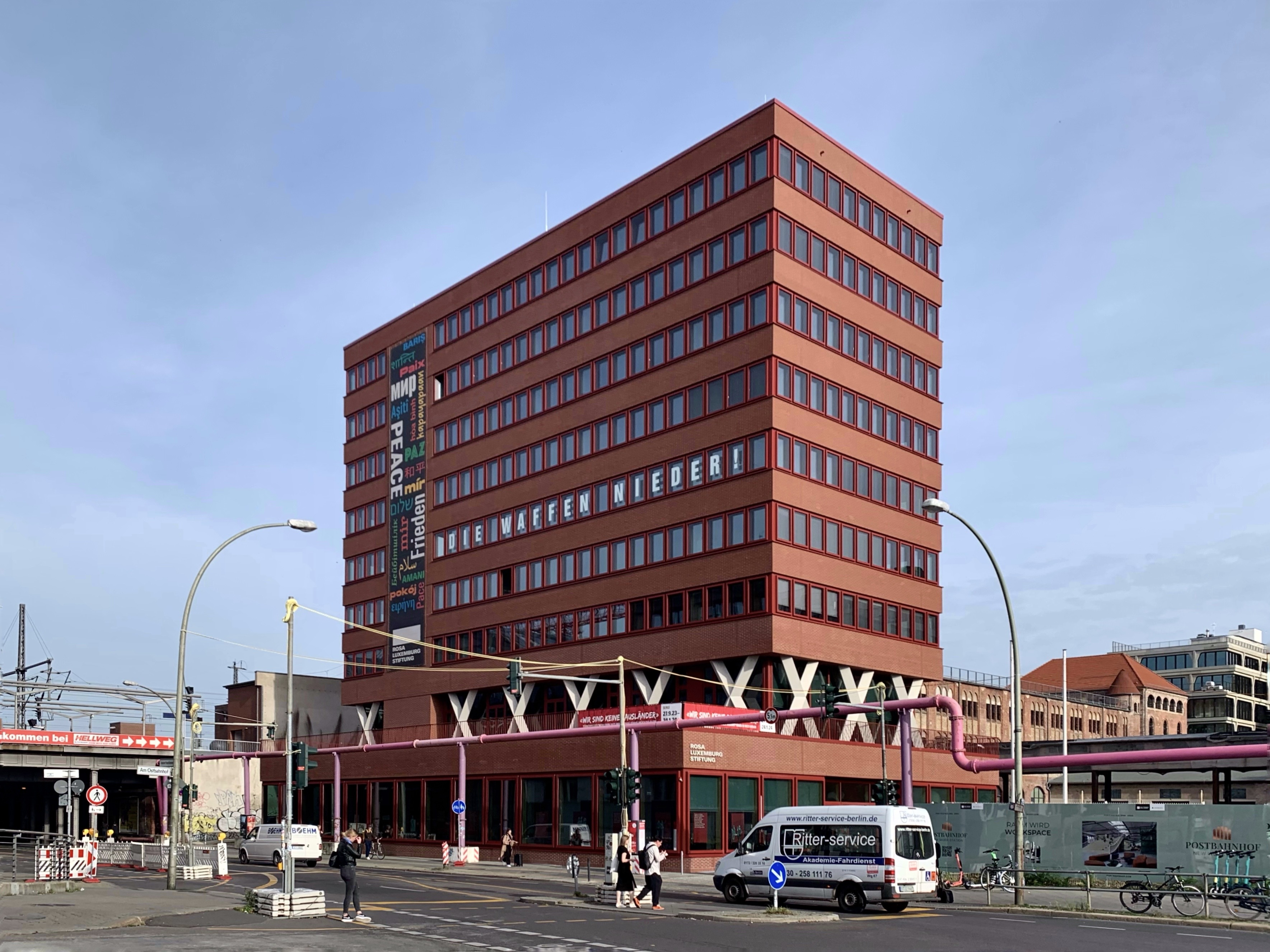
- Headquarters
- Abbreviation: RLS
- Named after: Rosa Luxemburg
- Formation: 1990
- Legal status: Registered association (e.V.)
- Headquarters: Berlin, Germany
- Chair: Dagmar Enkelmann
- Deputy: Thomas Händel
- Deputy: Sabine Reiner
- Executive director: Daniela Trochowski
- Affiliations: Die Linke
- Staff: 183 (2012)
- Website: www.rosalux.de

The Rosa Luxemburg Foundation (German: Rosa-Luxemburg-Stiftung e.V., RLS), named in recognition of Rosa Luxemburg, and occasionally referred to as Rosa-Lux, is a transnational alternative policy lobby group and educational institution founded in Berlin, Germany, in 1990. It is affiliated with the democratic socialist party Die Linke.

The foundation states that it "stands for democratic socialism with an unwavering internationalist focus" and is "committed to a radical perspective emphasizing public awareness, education, and social critique."

== History ==
The foundation was established in Berlin in 1990 (originally as the "Social Analysis and Political Education Association"). It is one of the state-subsidized German political foundations, which are associated with a political party represented in the federal parliament. In 2018, the Rosa Luxemburg Foundation received €64 million from the German government; the group received €71.2 million in 2024.

In 2008, the RLS established an office in Ramallah; they opened a Tel Aviv office the following year. In July 2025, the Rosa Luxemburg Foundation was declared an undesirable organization in Russia.

== See also ==
- Desiderius Erasmus Foundation (AfD)
- Friedrich Ebert Foundation (SPD)
- Friedrich Naumann Foundation for Freedom (FDP)
- Hanns Seidel Foundation (CSU)
- Heinrich Böll Foundation (Die Grünen)
- Konrad Adenauer Foundation (CDU)
