= Hanns Seidel Foundation =

Party political foundation of the German CSU

Logo of the Hanns Seidel Foundation

The Hanns Seidel Foundation (German: Hanns-Seidel-Stiftung e.V.; Abbreviation: HSS) is a German political party foundation. It is politically associated with but independent of the Christian Social Union of Bavaria (CSU) party and taxpayer-money funded political research registered association. It was founded in November 1966 after most of the other party-associated foundations in Germany had already been established. It is headquartered in Munich. The conference centre in the Banz Abbey is the foundation's main location. It is a member of the Centre for European Studies, the official foundation and think tank of the European People's Party. It is named after the CSU politician Hanns Seidel.

In April 2025, the Hanns Seidel Foundation was declared an undesirable organization in Russia.

== History ==
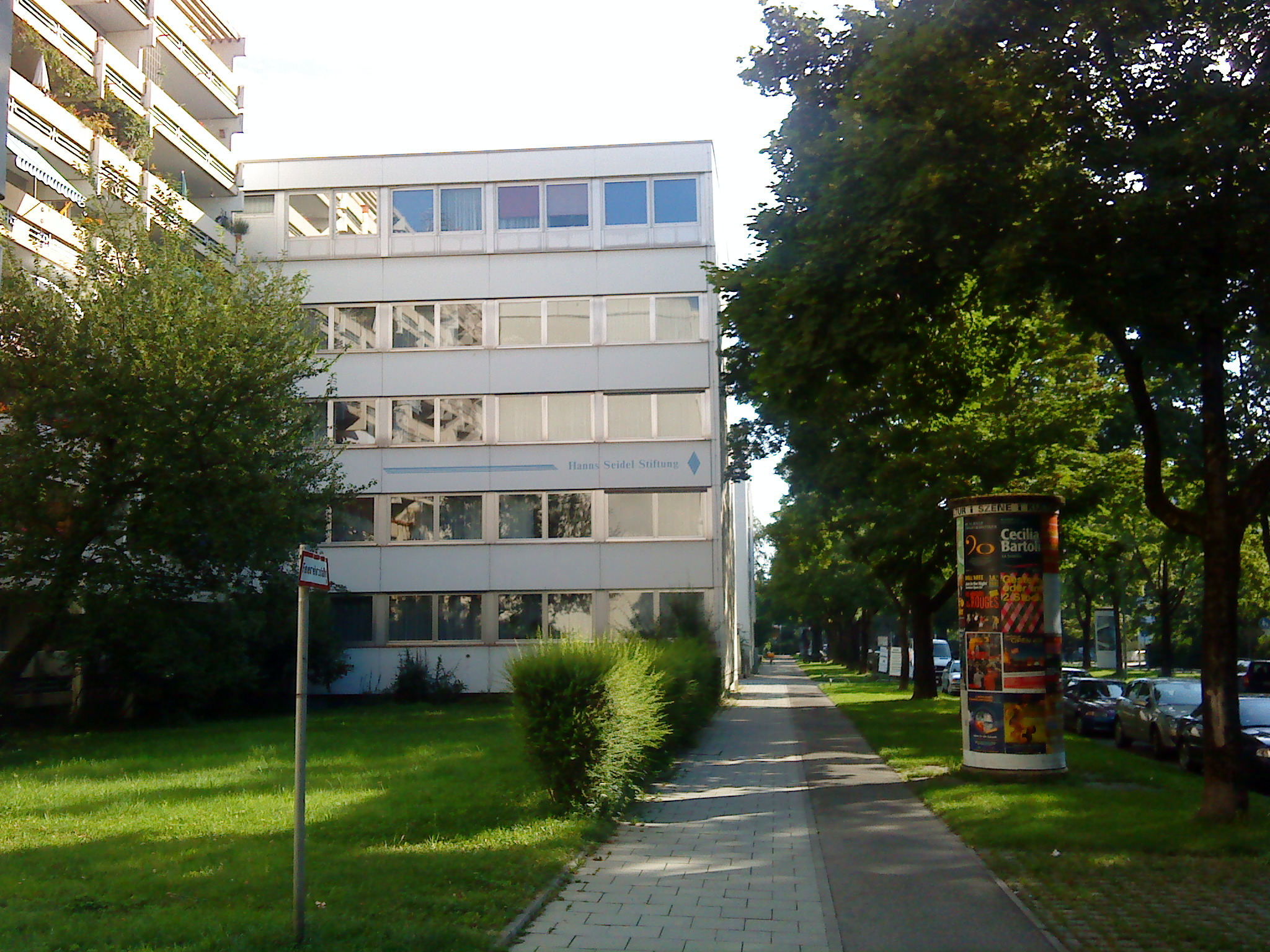
Administrative building in Munich

The CSU began planning to create its own institution for political education in 1964. At that time, the other parties with faction status in the German Bundestag already had comparable institutions. In April 1965, the CSU state executive decided to establish the Hanns Seidel Foundation, named after the former CSU chairman and Bavarian Prime Minister Hanns Seidel. Fritz Pirkl, Bavarian Minister of State for Labour and Social Affairs, was elected as the first chairman.

In 1975, the foundation opened the educational centre in Kreuth as a tenant of the Wittelsbach family. The lease for this conference building expired at the end of March 2016. In 1983, the educational centre at the Banz Abbey in Bad Staffelstein followed, and in 2001, a conference centre was opened next to the headquarters in Munich.

In 1981, the foundation began awarding scholarships for foreign students in Germany through its funding agency. Since 1982, domestic students have also received scholarships. The foundation also has a PhD scholarship program, where recipients who are working on their doctoral thesis receive additional funding for research and receive a monthly payment of 1,450 EUR. Students and doctoral candidates that are funded by the foundation scholarships are those with above-average academic achievements both socially and politically.

After Fritz Pirkl's death, Alfred Bayer was elected chairman in 1994, followed by former Bavarian Minister of Education Hans Zehetmair in 2004. In 2014, CSU chairman Horst Seehofer proposed the deputy chairwoman Ursula Männle as Zehetmair's successor. She was elected chairwoman by the general meeting on 12 May 2014 and was re-elected on 30 July 2018. In September 2019, she announced her resignation. Her successor in 2020 was Markus Ferber, a long-standing CSU MEP.

The foundation has around 270 employees and an annual budget of around €66 million. It is active in over 60 countries and provides funding to almost 1,300 students from Germany and abroad every year.

== Awards ==
The foundation awards prizes to promote special achievements in various fields. The sponsorship award for young songwriters has been presented to songwriters since 1987. In addition, the Franz Josef Strauß Prize is awarded at irregular intervals to 'personalities who have made an outstanding contribution to peace, freedom and justice, to democracy and international understanding, or who have rendered outstanding services in the fields of economics, science and technology, literature and art'. Previous winners include Mikhail Gorbachev, Jean-Claude Juncker, José María Aznar, Helmut Kohl, Roman Herzog, George Bush Sr., Henry Kissinger, and German Democratic Republic dissident Reiner Kunze.

In 2015, the Bavarian SPD parliamentary group leader Markus Rinderspacher called for the Franz Josef Strauss Prize to be revoked from Hungarian Prime Minister Viktor Orbán. Rinderspacher cited Orbán's attacks on fundamental democratic principles and the principles of solidarity of the European community of values as the reason. Orbán had been awarded the prize in 2001. In 2020, Rinderspacher renewed his demand. The reason was Orbán's controversial law restricting the rights of the Hungarian parliament in the wake of the COVID-19 pandemic.

From 1984 to 2012, the Folk Music Prize was awarded 428 times as part of the 'Folk Music Day' in Wildbad Kreuth and the Banz Abbey. The award was discontinued in mid-November 2012 after media reports revealed that the prize's founders, Maria and Max Wutz, were National Socialists. The foundation was made aware of this in 2001 but failed to disclose it. After the media reports, the foundation then commissioned the Institute for Contemporary History to conduct an independent investigation. The result was so clear that the foundation, which had 'accepted the legacy in good faith', divided the total inheritance of around €1.4 million as follows: €1.25 million went to the Bayerischer Jugendring to support Bavarian-Israeli youth and school exchanges, and €150,000 went to the Stiftung Bayerische Gedenkstätten to establish a memorial site at the former Dachau concentration camp subcamp Mühldorfer Hart.

== See also ==
Other parties in Germany also use the legal form of a foundation for support and public relation purposes. The other foundations are:

- Desiderius Erasmus Foundation (AfD)
- Friedrich Ebert Foundation (SPD)
- Friedrich Naumann Foundation for Freedom (FDP)
- Heinrich Böll Foundation (Die Grünen)
- Konrad Adenauer Foundation (CDU)
- Rosa Luxemburg Foundation (Die Linke).
