= Political foundation in Germany =

Foundation affiliated with a political party

A party political foundation (German: Parteinahe Stiftung or Parteistiftung) in Germany is a state-subsidised political foundation that's affiliated to a political party. There are seven foundations at the federal level: one for each party represented in the federal parliament (Bundestag). The major characteristics of all such organizations is that they do party related work like general information about the ideological cause, training of volunteers, publication of pamphlets and international aid for democracy building (in co-operation with partners around the world).

The party political foundations receive 95 per cent of their funding from government grants, thus blurring the definition of 'non-governmental organisation'. All except the FNF and the DES are not legally registered as a 'foundation' but as a private “Verein” under german law.

Similar institutions have also been organized in the Netherlands, Austria, France and Greece. In the UK and the US the general setup differs because institutions like the Westminster Foundation for Democracy, the National Democratic Institute (NDI) or the International Republican Institute (IRI) are limited to responsibilities in international aid. The same applies for the Netherlands Institute for Multiparty Democracy (NIMD).

== List of foundations ==
Name	Affiliated party	Founded
Konrad Adenauer Foundation	Christian Democratic Union	1955
Friedrich Ebert Foundation	Social Democratic Party	1925
Desiderius Erasmus Foundation	Alternative for Germany	2017
Friedrich Naumann Foundation	Free Democratic Party	1958
Rosa Luxemburg Foundation	The Left	1990
Heinrich Böll Foundation	Alliance '90/The Greens	1997
Hanns Seidel Foundation	Christian Social Union	1966

== Literature ==
- Pinto-Duschinsky, Michael, The Party Foundations and Political Finance in Germany. In: Seidle, Leslie F. (ed.), Comparative Issues in Party and Election Finance. Toronto, ON: Dundurn Press, 1991, pp. 179–250. ISBN 1-55002-100-1
- Lucardie, Paul/ Voerman, Gerrit, 'Party Foundations in the Netherlands', in: Nassmacher, Karl-Heinz (ed.), Foundations for Democracy. Approaches to Comparative Political Finance, Baden-Baden: Nomos, 2001, pp. 321–337.

== See also ==
- European political foundation
- Party finance in Germany
- Party funding in Austria
- Party funding in the Netherlands
