= Möllemann =

Mollemann is a surname. Notable people with the surname include:

- Jürgen Möllemann (1945–2003), German politician
- Stephan Möllemann, 16th-century German printer

== See also ==
- Henk Molleman (1935–2005), Dutch politician
