= Corporate donations =

Voluntary donations made by companies

The term corporate donation refers to any financial contribution made by a corporation to another organization that furthers the contributor's own objectives. Two major kinds of such donations deserve specific consideration, charitable as well as political donations.

According to a 2020 study of large United States–based corporations, "6.3 percent of corporate charitable giving may be politically motivated, an amount 2.5 times larger than annual PAC contributions and 35 percent of federal lobbying. Absent of disclosure requirements, charitable giving may be a form of corporate political influence undetected by voters and subsidized by taxpayers."

== Charitable donations ==
Corporations give to charitable causes, either because of the personal convictions of influential leaders within the corporation, or more commonly to help establish the public perception that the corporation is a good corporate citizen.

=== Types ===
Corporate charitable giving can be divided into direct cash and non-cash contributions. Direct cash giving comes from corporate headquarters, regional offices, or company sponsored foundations. Examples of direct cash contributions include:

- Community grants to support local community efforts or nonprofits – 100% of Fortune 500 companies provide some form of community grant or sponsor at least one fundraising event.
- Matching gifts – Corporate donations to nonprofits as a match to employee giving. Approximately 65% of Fortune 500 companies offer these programs.
- Volunteer grants – Giving to nonprofits in recognition of employee-volunteer service to that organization. Approximately 40% of Fortune 500 companies offer these programs.

Non-cash contributions are contributions of equipment, supplies or time, and do not include cash contributions. Examples of non-cash contributions include:

- Donation of new or used equipment or supplies, such as computers and other electronic equipment, office supplies, and targeted supplies such as clothing, canned goods, or paper products.
- Use of organizational services/facilities, such as financial and administrative support, computer services, printing, mailing or copying, or targeted professional services and support.
- Application of professional services, such as tax and financial advice, strategic planning and organizational development, graphic arts and copy writing, and legal assistance.

Non-cash contributions can also be interpreted through an organization's policy to allow employees paid time off when performing volunteer work.

=== Annual charitable giving figures ===
Total corporate cash donations in 2010 are estimated to be $15.29 billion in the United States. Of that, ~80%-85% came from corporate grants and sponsorship of fundraising events while ~15%-20% or $2–$3 billion came from corporate matching gifts and volunteer grants.

== Political donations ==
There is a wide range of models of political finance in democracies; political donations by individuals and organizations are one of many sources of funding.

=== United States ===
In the US, corporations are prohibited from making expenditures to influence federal elections. Similar restrictions exist in many state elections and have been upheld by the US Supreme Court.

Corporations may make donations to Political Action Committees (PACs); PACs generally have strict limits on their ability to advocate on behalf of specific parties or candidates, or even to coordinate their activities with political campaigns. PACs are subject to disclosure requirements at the federal and state levels. The ability of corporations to engage in such independent expenditures has been subject to intense debate after the US Supreme Court struck down, on free-speech grounds, limits in Citizens United v. FEC, a case involving the creation of a film critical of Hillary Clinton by a nonprofit corporation.

Donations are closely tracked by several organizations including OpenSecrets. Such organizations often group donations under specific corporations, but such donations refer to contributions from individuals and PACs associated with the corporation, not "corporate donations".

Corporate donations to PACs and Super PACs are a First Amendment issue and subject to intense political debate in the US. Proponents of tighter regulations of political donations by corporations argue that corporate donations corrupt democracy. Other research suggests that post-election lobbying and access to politicians, rather than campaign contributions, shapes and reinforces policy decision by politicians.

=== Charitable donations ===
Outside the political context, corporations in the United States also make significant charitable donations. According to the Giving USA 2024 report, corporate philanthropy increased by 9.1% in current dollars to reach US$44.4 billion in 2023, representing 6% of all charitable giving nationwide. Corporate giving typically includes direct cash contributions, in-kind donations, and employee matching gift programs, and is often directed toward education, health, disaster relief, and community development initiatives.

=== Germany ===
In Germany, both individuals and corporations may make unlimited contributions to political parties. These contributions are partially tax exempt and partially matched by government funds; contributions of more than 10000 Euros are reportable.

During the 2013 election cycle in Germany, corporations and other organizations made direct contributions to German political parties in the amount of at least 24.2 million Euros. Due to public subsidies of political parties and membership dues, such donations in Germany generally represent about 15% of the total revenue of major political parties; see Party finance in Germany.

=== Other countries ===
Australia, the Czech Republic, Denmark, Estonia, Germany, Luxembourg, the Netherlands, Norway, Spain, Sweden, Switzerland, and Turkey have no limits on either contributions for parliamentary elections or on spending on such elections.

In Belgium, Canada, Chile, France, Greece, Iceland, Ireland, Israel, Japan, South Korea, Poland, and Slovenia, there are limits on both contributions and spending

Austria, Hungary, Italy, New Zealand, Slovakia, the United Kingdom have no limits on contributions but do have limits on spending.

Finland and the United States have limits on contributions but not on spending.

== See also ==
- Corporate political spending – Notion that corporations can have some legal rights, responsibilities and accountability
- Corporate political donations in Australia
- Political finance – Funds used for political purposes
- Campaign finance – Fundraising for political campaigns
- Party funding in the Netherlands

== Literature ==
The literature given here refers to political donations by corporate donors only:

- Pinto-Duschinsky, Michael, British Political Finance, 1830-1980. Washington, DC: American Enterprise Institute: 1983, pp. 137–140, 228-238.
- Gidlund, Gullan M., Partistöd. Umea: CWK Gleerup: 1983, pp. 149–164.
- Alexander, Herbert E., Financing Politics. Money, Elections & Political Reform. 4th ed., Washington, DC: CQ Press, 1992, pp. 10–20, 54-70.
- Ruß, Sabine, Die Republik der Amtsinhaber. Baden-Baden: Nomos Verlag, 1993, pp. 56–65.
- Römmele, Andrea, Unternehmenspenden in der Parteien- und Wahlkampffinanzierung. Die USA, Kanada, die Bundesrepublik Deutschland und Großbritannien im internationalen Vergleich. Baden-Baden: Nomos Verlag, 1995.
- Ewing, Keith D., The Costs of Democracy. Party Funding in Modern British Politics. Oxford: Hart Publishing, 2007, pp. 87–142.
- McMenamin, Iain, If Money Talks, What Does It Say? Corruption and Business Financing of Political Parties, Oxford UK: Oxford University Press, 2013.
