= Friedrich Naumann Foundation =

German foundation for liberal politics

Friedrich Naumann Foundation for Freedom
- Abbreviation: FNF
- Established: 19 May 1958 (68 years ago)
- Legal status: private foundation
- Headquarters: Potsdam
- Country: Germany
- Chairpersons: Steffen Saebisch
- Revenue: 79,945,381 euro (2022)
- Total Assets: 31,074,630.4 euro (2023)
- Employees: 281 (2024)
- Website: www.freiheit.org

The Friedrich Naumann Foundation for Freedom (German: Friedrich-Naumann-Stiftung für die Freiheit; Abbreviation: FNF) is a German foundation for liberal politics, associated with but independent from the Free Democratic Party and funded by the Federal Ministry of Research, Technology and Space. It was established in 1958 by Theodor Heuss, the first president of the Federal Republic of Germany. The foundation supplemented its name in 2007 with the words "for Freedom" (für die Freiheit).

The foundation follows the ideals of the Protestant theologian, Friedrich Naumann, with the exception of his Christian socialist views. Naumann believed that a functioning democracy requires politically informed and educated citizens. According to him, civic education is a prerequisite for political participation and thus for democracy. The foundation has offices in Europe, Africa, America, and Asia. It also has close links to the Liberal International.

The foundation's activities in the field of civic education consist of seminars, conferences and publications aimed at promoting liberal values and principles. The international political dialogue program provides a discussion forum for a liberal issues. The foundation's counselling programs focus on candidates for political office, liberal political parties and other democratic organizations.

== Scholarship program ==
As of 2009 the Friedrich Naumann Foundation provides scholarships to approximately 800 students, among those 175 PhD students. Scholarships are granted after a competitive multi-stage admission process. The selection is based on grades, letters of recommendation, leadership potential, community service, and a visible commitment to liberal values. The scholarship system is funded by the Federal Government. Around 1% of university students in Germany hold one of these federally funded merit scholarships. Around 20% of the scholarships are held by foreign students studying at a university in Germany.

== Foreign involvement ==
In Peru, the foundation was involved in a misunderstanding on a meeting related to some members of the Congress. The Peru Office Director testified before the Peruvian Congress to clear the misunderstanding.

The North America Regional Office in Washington, D.C. runs two programs. The Transatlantic Dialogue Program encourages discussions between the US, Canada, and Germany on various fronts, while the World Order and Globalization Hub enhances global economic understanding. Both aim to foster knowledge exchange and promote global social and economic progress.

Shortly after the invasion of Ukraine in 2022, the foundation's work in Moscow was stopped and the Moscow office's registration was revoked. In April 2024, the Friedrich Naumann Foundation was declared an undesirable organization in Russia.

The foundation also established a Human Rights Hub in Geneva.

== See also ==
- Archive of Liberalism
- Contributions to liberal theory
- Liberal democracy
- Liberalism worldwide
- Desiderius Erasmus Foundation (AfD)
- Friedrich Ebert Foundation (SPD)
- Hanns Seidel Foundation (CSU)
- Heinrich Böll Foundation (Die Grünen)
- Konrad Adenauer Foundation (CDU)
- Rosa Luxemburg Foundation (Die Linke)
- German National Academic Foundation (non-political and non-denominational)
