= Graft (politics) =

Political corruption in which funds for public projects are used for private benefit

Graft, as understood in American English, is a form of political corruption defined as the unscrupulous use of a politician's authority for personal gain. Political graft occurs when funds intended for public projects are intentionally misdirected in order to maximize the benefits to private interests.

Political graft functions when the public officer is directed to purchase goods or services from a specific private interest at a cost far above regular market rates. The private interest then siphons some of the gratuitous profits to government officials who are able to ensure that future government spending continues in the same fashion so that this lucrative relationship continues. A member of a government may misappropriate directly from government funds, but they may also make decisions benefiting their own private economic interests by using inside knowledge of upcoming government decisions to their benefit, in a manner similar to insider trading.

Although the conflict between public and private interests is common to all forms of corruption, the term "graft" is specific to the intentional misdirection of official funds. Although not the original usage of the term, graft in the modern context is commonly used as a blanket term for political embezzlement, influence peddling, or other forms of corruption. While embezzlement and influence peddling are elements sometimes present in graft, the relationship is not deterministic.

George W. Plunkitt coined the term "honest graft" ("I seen my opportunities and I took em."), distinguishing it from "dishonest graft" ("blackmailin' gamblers, saloonkeepers, disorderly people, etc."). As an example, he cited buying land before it became known to the public that it had been earmarked for a new park, then selling it for a profit.

The British and Australian definition is very different: a grafter is a person who works hard and conscientiously.

== See also ==
- Corruption
- Cronyism
- Grift
- Inside job
- Money trail
- Nepotism
- Patronage
- Political corruption
- Political finance
