= Political funding in Ireland =

Politic funding in Ireland under the Electoral act of 1997

Political funding in Ireland has re-emerged as an issue of public policy quite recently when in 2012 the Electoral Act of 1997 was amended to cover basic needs of transparency and control.

== Public funding ==
Under the Electoral Act 1997, a registered party is eligible for payments from the Central Fund in proportion to the percentage of total first-preference votes its candidates received at the previous general election. This is subject to a minimum threshold of two percent of the total first-preference votes. There was criticism of this after the 2019 Irish local elections when Renua received €250,000 despite losing its last remaining elected representatives. Small parties on the brink of the threshold have also exhorted supporters to turn out even in constituencies where their local candidate has no chance of winning a seat.

== Sources of revenue up until 2012 ==
Details about the sources of political funds prior to 2012 were rather scarce. Based on the information published for 1998 Murphy and Farrell contend that Fianna Fáil and Sinn Féin were the parties which received the highest amounts of private funding. Fianna Fáil reported €432,501 and Sinn Féin total donations of €230,000. Whereas the bulk of the former funds were contributed by the business sector (e.g. hoteliers, builders etc.), most of the latter came from U.S. donors (friends of Sinn Féin). The Labour Party was heavily reliant on contributions by the trade unions.

== Public support ==
Ireland provides free broadcasting time for all parties which nominated a minimum number of candidates. The allocation formula seeks to give fair opportunities to all parties, taking into account the number of candidates presented and the share of votes polled in the previous election. Because 'Irish politicians cannot buy time on the broadcast media', independent candidates are granted by law 'some coverage in the news'. In addition, there is a subsidy for current party operations. In a per capita comparison of six countries it has turned out that Ireland is the most generous provider of public support to its parties.

== Spending ==
A recent study of general political spending levels has found (on a per capita basis) that Ireland was almost in line with Canada, slightly ahead of the United States and much more so of Australia and the United Kingdom. Quite in line with developments in other established democracies, Irish party headquarters have stepped up their routine activities and shifted their budgets accordingly, Salaries, wages and benefits comprise about one-third of party headquarters' annual spending.

=== Election expenses ===
Limits to how much a candidate in an election may spend on their campaign were reintroduced by the 1997 act, having been abolished by the Electoral Act 1963. In Dáil, European, and Presidential elections, a lower limit is reimbursed from public funds provided the candidate reaches a minimum share of the vote, defined as one-quarter of the single transferable vote quota. This reimbursement was introduced by the 1997 act and in 2001 replaced the previous system of requiring a deposit paid in advance by a candidate, reimbursed if the candidate reached one-quarter of a quota. The deposit provision was struck out in 2001 as unconstitutionally discriminating against poorer would-be candidates. The quota limit is applied to the candidate's votes including transfers rather than first-preference votes alone; therefore, a candidate whose vote total is too low for them to be elected will nevertheless not be eliminated as long as there uncertainty over whether they would reach the expenses threshold. The basic rules apply to independent politicians running in a single election; there are extra rules for pooling of expenses between candidates of the same party, or where a single candidate runs simultaneously in multiple elections.

Election spending limits
Election type	Constituency size	Spending limit €	Reimbursement limit €
Presidential	National	750,000	200,000.00
European	Any	230,000	38,092.14
Dáil	5-seat	45,200	8,700.00
Dáil	4-seat	37,650	8,700.00
Dáil	3-seat	30,150	8,700.00
Local	Population (Note: Population of local electoral area at previous census) over 35,000	13,000	
Local	Population 18,001–35,000	11,500	
Local	Population up to 18,000	9,750	

== Regulation ==
There is a ban on foreign donations. The legal maximum for anonymous donations is set at €100, rather low when compared to other countries. The annual maximum for all donors is €6,350 per party and €2,540 per parliamentary candidate. A late start among political finance reformers has enabled Ireland to link public subsidies for party activity with financial incentives to generally encourage gender equality within the parties. This will be achieved by a legal prescription that parties will face a 50 per cent cut of their public subsidy unless at least 30 per cent of all candidates are women and at least 30 per cent are men. Moreover, Irish parties must apply some part of their subsidy to a variety of specified purposes, among them promoting youth and female political participation. Since no further clarification is provided, this may simply refer to the operation of separate women's and youth groups, which is a traditional feature of many parties. The financial reports filed by the three major parties for 2011 show that Fianna Fáil spent €7,50 for the purpose, but Fine Gael no more than €152. The Labour Party seems to differ considerably, because it spent €61,107 to promote female participation (although almost three-quarters of this total was spent on 'salaries and pensions').

== Enforcement ==
The Standards in Public Office Commission has jurisdiction over party and candidate financing. International IDEA conveys the impression that hitherto it has displayed respectful neglect of all "big fish" donations, which tend to go unreported. Without presenting evidence for its deviating view, the GRECO report on Ireland assigns a much more positive evaluation to 'the proactive advisory role played by the Standards Commission to promote transparency of party funding'.
