= Political funding in New Zealand =

Political funding in New Zealand deals with political donations, public funding and other forms of funding received by politician or political party in New Zealand to pay for an election campaign. Only quite recently (1993, 2009) has political funding become an issue of public policy. Now there is direct and indirect funding by public money as well as a skeleton regulation of income, expenditure and transparency.

== Regulation ==
=== Spending limits ===
Like a few other established democracies (e.g. Canada and the United Kingdom) New Zealand election law stipulates statutory limits for political spending by individuals, groups or organisations that occurs at election times to influence political discourse in general or the outcome of a specific election in particular. In New Zealand spending limits for political parties and candidates (i.e. their campaign spending) do not include some typical election expenses (e.g. opinion polling, travel costs, consultancy fees). At the 2020 general election, advertising spending limits stood at $27,500 for political candidates and $1,169,000 plus $27,500 per electorate for political parties. Individuals and groups not running had spending limits of $13,200 although it was possible to increase the amount to $330,000 by registering with the Electoral Commission.

=== Donations ===
There is no upper limit to political contributions made to parties and/ or candidates which are not anonymous, either for election campaign or during specific time periods. Donations by government contractors (and possibly by state-owned enterprises) are allowed, too. Political contributions by foreign donors are allowed as long as they do not exceed $50. Larger foreign donations, however, are possible if money is funneled through New Zealand businesses trusts or foundations. For instance, in August 2019, the National Party received a $150,000 donation from Chinese billionaire Lang Lin who owned a business in New Zealand.

Anonymous donations (Note: Anonymous to the receiving party) to parties and candidates are limited to a maximum of $1,500. Donors that wish to donate more than $1,500 without revealing their identity to the public or the party can make donations protected from disclosure. A donation protected from disclosure involves the donor paying the sum and disclosing their identity (name and address) to the Electoral Commission, which then passes the donation to the party in installments. Individuals and groups can donate a maximum of $48,441 between successive election campaigns by protected disclosure.

Parties are required to file annual financial returns ('donation statements') that disclose the total amount of donations received. The return must include the full name and address of non-anonymous domestic donors whose donation exceeds $5,000 and non-anonymous overseas donors whose donation exceeds $50. A separate return must be filed by a party secretary with the Electoral Commission within 20 working days of receipt whenever a party receives a donation that: exceeds $20,000, or when added to all the donations received from the same donor in the preceding 12 months exceeds $20,000.

Candidates are required to fill returns on election years that are very similar but have a reduced threshold of $1,500 for full disclosure of non-anonymous donations. Unlike party returns, candidate returns also include election expenses.

=== Reform history ===
In early December 2019, the New Zealand Government passed legislation under urgency to limit foreign donations over NZ$50. Justice Minister Andrew Little announced that this was part of the Government's efforts to combat foreign interference in New Zealand elections, bringing New Zealand in line with Australia, Canada, the United Kingdom, and the United States which have introduced similar legislation. The legislation does not change the rules that allow foreign donations to political parties via New Zealand companies.

In early August 2022, Justice Minister Kiri Allan announced that the Government would be introducing new electoral donation amendment bill which would widen the definition of political donations to include those donated to third-party entities and make it an offence not to report such donations to a party's secretary. This amendment proposal came in response to the recent acquittal of two defendants involved with the New Zealand First Foundation, a separate fundraising entity connected to the New Zealand First party. The amendment, which was passed into law as the Electoral Amendment Act 2022 and took effect from 2023 also reduced the anonymous donation disclosure threshold from NZ$15,000 to NZ$5,000 and requires parties to report all donations received, including those under $1,500 that were previously exempt from reporting requirements. The act also reduced the threshold at which political parties must report large political donations during election years from $30,000 to $20,000.

== Sources of funds ==
=== Private funding ===
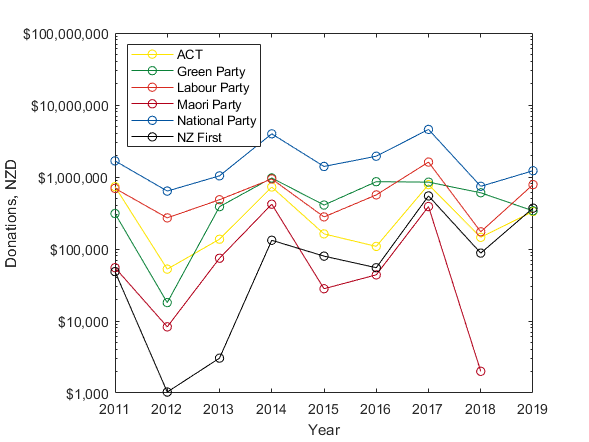
A logarithmic plot of private declared donations to parties that have been in the New Zealand parliament from 2011 to 2020. This excludes some parties such as the Internet Party and the New Conservative Party that received considerable sums on some years, however failed to enter parliament. (Note: The returns filed by parties are not a comprehensive overview of all donations received by the parties. Only donations that meet criteria set in the Electoral Act 1993 must be declared on the return. Notably non-anonymous donations under $1500 NZD are not recorded in the returns. More information regarding what is required on the returns can be found on the elections.nz website)

As political parties in New Zealand are not required to declare non-anonymous donations under $1,500, it is not possible to determine the total sum of donations to each party. The Electoral Commission does, however, have data on declared donations from 1996 – 2019.

Of the total sum of large recorded donations (exceeding personal information disclosure thresholds (Note: These thresholds were $1000 (1996), $10,000 (1997-2007), $10,000 (2008-2010) and $15,000 (2011-2019) in nominal terms)) made to parties between 1996 and 2019, the largest proportion was donated by private donors (25% (Note: Excluding millionaires, anonymous donors and MPs)), followed by millionaires (18%), businesses (13%), trusts (13%) and anonymous donors (13%). The average size of these large donations was significantly higher for millionaires ($1,381,000) and trusts ($154,000) compared to private individuals ($50,000) and other categories.

When classified by party receiving the donation, the highest average large donations went to small parties outside parliament ($96,000) followed by National ($55,000), Act ($46,000), Labour ($40,000) and the Green Party ($23,000). National derived most of their large donations in this period from trusts (40%), businesses (26%), private individuals (24%) and anonymous donors (10%) while Labour received large donations from anonymous donors (30%), private individuals (26%), businesses (17%), trade unions (12%) and MPs (10%). The Green Party received the majority of large donations from MPs (70%) (Note: The Green Party has a policy requiring MPs to tithe 10% of their pre tax salary to the party) and individuals (25%) while Act received the majority of large donations from individuals (45%) and anonymous donors (40%). Large anonymous donations listed in these statistics were received prior to the introduction of the Electoral Finance Act in 2007 which introduced limits to anonymous donations. The National Party ceased to receive funding from trusts following the 2011 election for unknown reasons, however reported an increase in reported donations below the disclosure threshold.

While no statistically significant change in large (Note: Above $15,000 in 2020 dollars) reported donations to political parties was observed between 1996 and 2019, large donations to candidates increased by more than a factor of two between 2011 and 2017.

In 18 January 2023, The New Zealand Herald reported that the National Party had raised NZ$2.3 million to fund their 2023 election campaign from 24 big donors in 2022. The ACT Party also raised NZ$1.1 million in large donations in 2022. By comparison, the incumbent Labour Party had raised NZ$150,000 during that same period including a NZ$50,000 donation from the family of Les Mills gym owner Phillip Mills. In addition, the Green Party raised NZ$122,000 through tithes from co-leaders James Shaw and Marama Davidson. Finally, the New Zealand First party received a NZ$35,000 donation from Tom Bowker.

=== Public funding ===
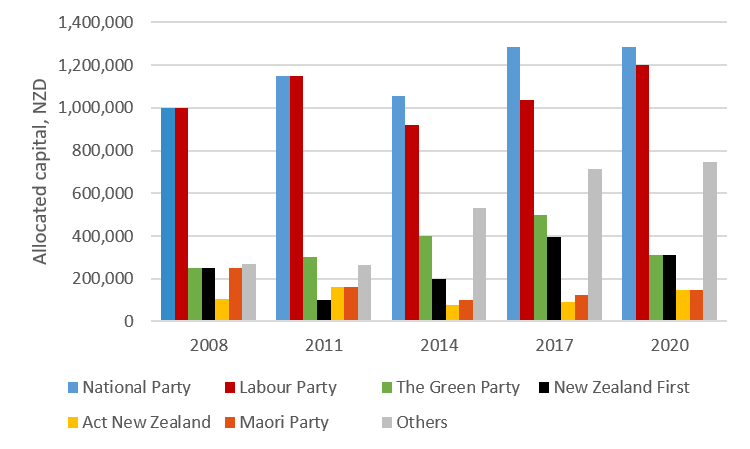
Electoral Commission broadcasting allocations for the major political parties of New Zealand.

During general election periods, all registered political parties are eligible for funds to broadcast election programmes and advertising. During the 2005, 2008, 2011 and 2014 elections total funding for the broadcasting allocation stood at $3,212,000 and included an allocation of free broadcasting time on TVNZ and RNZ. In 2016, the free broadcasting time was abolished and replaced by a $750,000 increase in the broadcasting allocation.

The funds are distributed to parties by the Commission according to several quantitative and qualitative statutory criteria including: previous election results, by-election results, party members in parliament prior to dissolution, cross-party relationships, indicators of support (i.e. opinion polls) and the need to provide a fair opportunity to all parties.

Parties may use the allocation to buy advertising time on television and radio, place advertising on the internet and pay for the production costs of television, radio and internet advertising. The Broadcasting Act 1989 prohibits parties from using their own money to buy time to broadcast television and radio advertisements. However, production costs for television and radio advertising can be paid for using the allocation or a party’s own funds. Television and radio advertisements can only be broadcast from writ day.

Parties may use the allocation to produce election advertisements and to place advertising on the internet before and after writ day. However, parties must use their own money to place election advertisements on the internet that only appear before writ day. Parties may use their allocation to produce internet advertisements, but parties must publish these advertisements both before and after writ day.

== See also ==
- Electoral Act 1993
- 2005 New Zealand election funding controversy
