= Political finance =

Funds used for political purposes

Political finance covers all funds that are raised and spent for political purposes. Such purposes include all political contests for voting by citizens, especially the election campaigns for various public offices that are run by parties and candidates. Moreover, all modern democracies operate a variety of permanent party organizations, e.g. the Democratic National Committee and the Republican National Committee in the United States or the Conservative Campaign Headquarters, Labour Party Headquarters and the Liberal Democrat Headquarters in the United Kingdom. The annual budgets of such organizations will have to be considered as costs of political competition as well. In Europe the allied term "party finance" is frequently used. It refers only to funds that are raised and spent in order to influence the outcome of some sort of party competition. Whether to include other political purposes, e.g. public relation campaigns by lobby groups, is still an unresolved issue. Even a limited range of political purposes (campaign and party activity) indicates that the term "campaign funds" (used as subject heading in Library of Congress cataloguing) is too narrow to cover all funds that are deployed in the political process.

== Expenses for politics ==
Political expenses can be caused by

- election campaigns run by candidates, candidate committees, interest groups or political parties,
- contests for nomination or re-selection of parliamentary candidates,
- training activities for party activists, officeholders or candidates,
- policy development by parties or party related bodies,
- current operations of party organizations at the national, regional or local level and
- efforts to educate citizens with regard to popular initiatives, ballot issues or referendums.

Most frequently and in most countries the organizations that raise and spend money for political purposes are parties (headquarters, branches and chapters). Party headquarters spend on public relations, mass media (including billboards), the expertise of consultants and offices. Local party chapters (e.g. constituency or riding associations), which rely on volunteers (party activists), cover telecommunication and mail charges as well as rent and heating for storefront offices, which they use as their centers of political activity.

== Sources of funds ==
Political revenue may be collected from small donors or individual citizens ("grassroots fundraising"), who make small contributions or pay party membership dues; wealthy individuals; organizations including businesses, interest groups, professional organizations and trade unions; assessments of officeholders (called the "party tax"); government subsidies; or generally illegal activities including graft, buying access to politicians, offices, honors or titles, extortion of wealthy people and influence peddling). G. M. Gidlund has classified the available options of fund-raising by three categories: Membership, plutocratic and public funding. As the relevance of signed-up party members and their dues can vary among the democracies the terms grassroots fundraising, plutocratic finance and public funding may offer a more adequate general framework.

=== Grassroots fundraising ===
Many believe that as a normative concept popular government (vulgo democracy) should require that the people at large cover the costs of their democracy. However, this can only be done on a voluntary basis, because all forms of political participation in a democracy are voluntary in principle. At election times many people abstain from voting. Likewise at all times the majority of citizens also abstains from donating to political coffers. Nonetheless, many believe that broad fundraising from small donors is the ideal form of funding. Political fundraisers should try "to exploit the latent giving power in the general population" and make every reasonable effort to raise "significant sums ... collected in small change." This is especially true for all democracies with a high standard of living for the majority of their citizens.

Popular financing of politics can be an important source of political revenue (as it is in the U.S. and Canada, the Netherlands and Switzerland). However, it is not a constant and reliable source. The numbers of signed-up party members who pay their dues regularly fluctuates over time wherever democratic parties care to recruit them. Today even the traditional mass-membership parties of the democratic left (Social Democrats or workers' parties) raise less than a quarter of their funds from the grassroots. Collection of small donations depends very much on the current mood of people's emotions towards politics, policies and politicians. A variety of ways are available (nationwide lotteries, direct mail drives, peer, neighborhood or internet solitication, social events at the local level, even yard sales) for grassroots fundraising. Personal (door-to-door or peer group) solicitation was quite frequent in the fifties. Since the 1960s it has been superseded by telethons and computerized mass mailings. In more recent years internet solicitation has played a major role.

=== Plutocratic finance ===
In the old days landed aristocrats and successful entrepreneurs of the ruling classes supplied the funds necessary for democratic politics. Later on, interest groups and others provided money. Although trade unions that funded left-of-center parties were among the suppliers of money, money for campaigns came from a relatively small number of large donors.

In some cases governing parties have abused their powers by rent-seeking. Some have demanded graft for a license or a favor, others ristournes (in Quebec) or tangenti (in Italy) for public procurement. In some times and places, officeholders (including MPs, legislators and councillors) have been expected to pay an 'assessment' on their salaries for political jobs.

=== Public subsidies ===
After World War II, politicians including Luis Muñoz Marín in Puerto Rico, Gerhard Stoltenberg in Germany, Jean Lesage in Quebec and Tage Erlander in Sweden found a way to put "the costs of democracy" directly upon the taxpayer.

Most modern democracies (in one way or the other) provide government subsidies for party activity, typically in cash and/or free access to public or private media. India and Switzerland are the most notable exceptions. Public subsidies can be relatively small (as in the UK and USA) or quite generous (as in Sweden, Germany, Israel and Japan), and usually exist side-by-side with private fundraising. Party organizations, parliamentary groups (party caucusses) and candidates are typically the recipients of public support (in cash or kind).

Although government subsidies are now common in western democracies, such subsidies remain controversial. Because matching funds and tax credits depend on financial contributions by individual citizens such support is more compatible with participatory democracy than flat grants that do not require specific efforts by the fundraising organizations.

Taxpayers in continental Europe and non-western democracies (like Israel and Japan) provide higher amounts towards party activity than their Anglo-Saxon counterparts. Many party headquarters in the high-subsidy countries cover between 40 and 60 per cent of their annual budget via public grants. Such heavy involvement of the taxpayer calls for a maximum of transparency for political funds.

== Regulation (political finance regime) ==
Many countries have regulated the flow of political funds. Such regulation, the political finance regime, may include bans and limits on certain kinds of income and expenditure, level and distribution of as well as access to direct and indirect public subsidies, transparency of political funds by disclosure and reporting as well as enforcement of rules and sanctions for infringements. Financing of political campaigns have become very controversial, particularly since the era of party reform in the late 1960s and early 1970s. Arguments for restricting the amount of, or banning certain sources for, campaign contributions are usually couched in terms of the public interest in clean politics, but the effects of such restrictions or bans almost invariably are to protect incumbent office holders from serious challenges from aspirants who lack their name recognition or official status. Also, Democrats in the U.S. typically inveigh against the financial advantages of the so-called "fat cats", while Republicans are wary of the war chests possessed by public and private labor unions, especially the former. The Hatch Act was passed in 1940 to forbid political activity by federal government employees, but the rise of the public sector union since 1961 has cemented a tight financial tie between government employees and their primary benefactors, usually Democrats.

Bans on political expenditure concern either campaign expenses by non-candidates ("independent expenditures", "third party advertising") or media time paid for by political contestants. Both types of bans have to strike an adequate balance between two constitutional principles, the equality of opportunities (fairness) and the freedom of expression. Britain applies a spending limit for constituency candidates since 1883. Canada was the first democracy to add campaign limits for national party organizations in 1974 and spending limits for constituency nomination contestants in 2004. The U.S. Supreme Court (in Buckley v. Valeo 424 U.S. 1 (1976) has struck down spending limits because they interfere with free speech rights under the First Amendment to the U.S. Constitution. In order to be effective all limits require careful monitoring and serious enforcement backed up by adequate sanctions.

Among the rules, which either restrict or favor specific types of political revenue, incentives to stimulate specific fundraising activities (like tax benefits or matching grants) are still rare. More frequent are contribution limits or outright bans. Many countries ban anonymous donations or contributions from foreign sources. In some democracies corporate donations for political purposes are illegal. Quite frequently political finance regimes include contribution limits. The maximum donation allowed may differ either by type of donor (individual citizens, legal entities), by recipient (candidate or party) or by purpose to be funded (nomination contest, election campaign, routine operation). In some countries (e.g. Germany) there is no statutory limit on the amount of political contributions, which a person or corporation may give to a party or candidate.

If rules for transparency of political funds stipulate the disclosure of donors' identity, the public's right to know about financial backers may interfere with the need to protect the privacy of political preferences, the principle of the secret ballot. The practical solution will distinguish between categories of donors and/ or define cut-off points for privacy, e.g. $100 or €10,000. Both ways serve to separate financial contributions as a means of participation from donations as means of buying access or peddling influence. Any disclosure regulation has to identify a person or an institution that is responsible for the transparent flow of funds to and from party coffers and the kind of information, which has to be disclosed timely and accessibly.

The reporting' of political funds (to be submitted annually and/ or after elections) usually includes various sources of income and specified items of expenditure, e.g. staff and offices, advertisements in print media, radio and TV, campaign material, direct mailing, opinion polling. Effective reporting by parties and candidates depends on the definition of useful categories for the funds raised and spent, the inclusion of data for all spending units as well as the procedure for examination and publication of financial reports. Currently no democracy provides for full transparency of all political funds.

All political finance regimes require authorities and agencies that are responsible for monitoring, control and enforcement. Legislation has to strike a balance between practical independence of the agency in charge, effective enforcement of the rules for the funding of political competition and adequate implementation of legal stipulations. Global research shows that highly sophisticated rules, over-regulation of some issues and lax implementation of such rules do not lead to best practice.

== Study of political finance ==
The study of political finance was pioneered by James K. Pollock and Louise Overacker. Alexander Heard contributed a groundbreaking analysis for the U.S. International comparison started with Arnold J. Heidenheimer, who also introduced the term 'political finance' to comprise campaign and party funding. Thus he was bridging the gap of perception between North America and Western Europe.

Herbert E. Alexander studied the U.S. situation for many decades and edited a couple of comparative volumes. Arthur B. Gunlicks concluded this cycle of comparative studies. Daniel Lowenstein authored publications on legal aspects of campaign finance. The most important early studies on non-US countries were written by Khayyam Z. Paltiel (Canada) and Michael Pinto-Duschinsky (Britain). Between 1963 and 2001 Colin Hughes and Ernest Chaples produced the early articles that covered campaign finance in Australia. More recent contributions to the literature include Marcin Walecki's monograph on Poland, the book by Daniel Smilov and Jurij Toplak on Eastern Europe, as well as Kevin Casas Zamora's comparative analysis of public funding with two case studies from Latin America. Recently, funding from foreign sources and governments has become a major concern of governments and scholars.

== See also ==
- Campaign finance
- Lobbying
- Political party funding
- Party subsidies
- Track AIPAC
