= Party finance in Sweden =

Since the 1970s party finance in Sweden on all levels of the political system depends heavily on public subsidies With an estimated SEK 146 (more than $17) per voter a year the spending level is among the highest in the world of established democracies.

== Sources of funds ==
Public subsidies are the major source of party funds in Sweden. At the national level they provide 80 to 90 per cent of the major parties' annual revenue.

== Items of spending ==
With all Swedish parties "annual routine spending is far more important than extra campaign expenses".

== Regulation of political money ==
As a consequence of preserving the internal autonomy of political parties as voluntary associations there was no regulation whatsoever for many years. Parties and lawmakers believed that this autonomy had to be preserved. When GRECO started to evaluate "Transparency of Party Funding" in Council of Europe member states the organization recommended to require political parties "to keep proper books and accounts ... to ensure that income, expenditure, assets and debts are accounted for in a comprehensive manner following a coherent format", to consolidate such accounts to include local branches and provide for easy access of the general public to the annual accounts of political parties. The Swedish authorities replied "that they did not have any reason to believe that the longstanding self-regulation" needs to be amended. However, by the end of 2012, the Swedish government had "decided to initiate a legislative process with the purpose of ... making information regarding the funding of political parties more accessible. ... draft legislation would be submitted to Parliament in autumn 2013."

== Bibliography ==
- Gullan M. Gidlund, Partistöd, Umea: CWK Gleerup, 1983.
- Gullan Gidlund,'Public Investments in Swedish Democracy'. In: Matti Wiberg (ed.): The Public Purse and Political Parties. Public Financing of Political Parties in Nordic Countries. Jyväskykä; Gummerus, 1991, pp. 13-54.
- Klee-Kruse, Gudrun: Financing Parties and Elections in Small European Democracies. Austria and Sweden'. In: Gunlicks, Arthur B. (ed.); Campaign and Party Finance in North America and Western Europe, Boulder CO: Westview Press, 1993, pp. 178-200.
- Gullan Gidlund, 'Regulation of Party Finance in Sweden'. In: Herbert E. Alexander and Rei Shiratori (eds.): Comparative Political Finance Among the Democracies, Boulder CO: Westview Press, 1994, pp. 105-114.
- Gullan Gidlund and Ruud Koole, 'Political Finance in the North of Europe (The Netherlands and Sweden)'. In: Karl-Heinz Nassmacher (ed.), Foundations for Democracy, Baden-Baden: Nomos Verlag, 2001, pp. 112-130.
