= Campaign finance =

Funds raised for promotion in politics

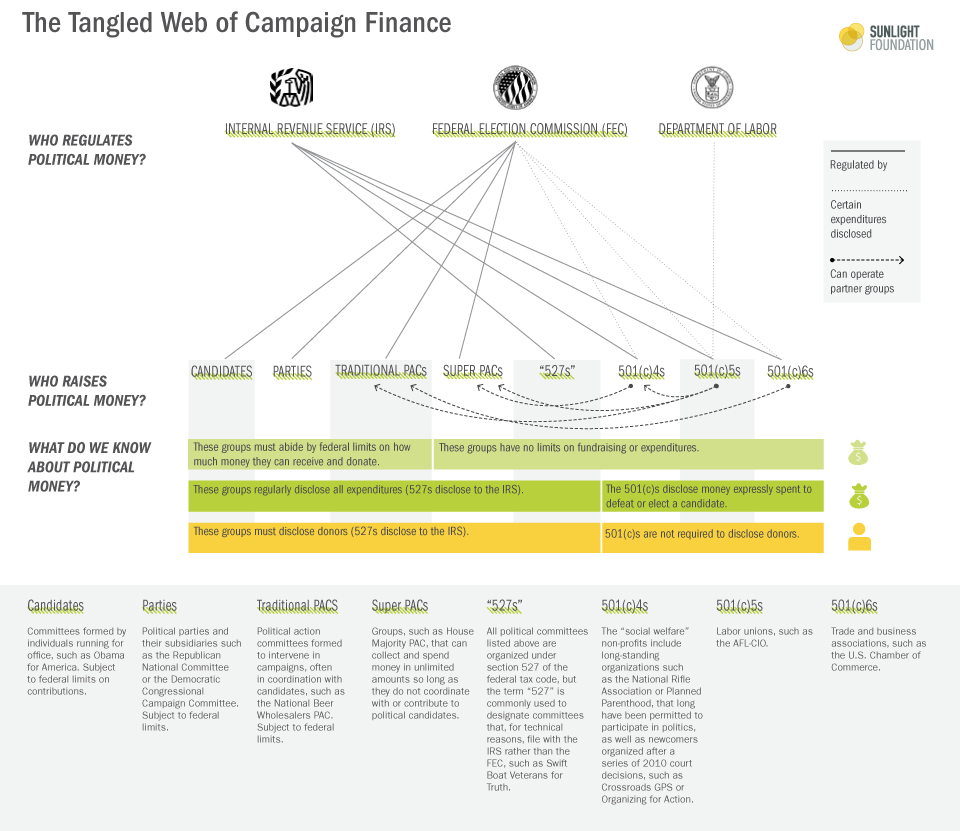
An infographic explaining the American system of campaign finance, by the Sunlight Foundation

Campaign finance—also called election finance, political donations, or political finance (Note: Political finance covers all funds that are raised and spent for political purposes.)—refers to the funds raised to promote candidates, political parties, or policy initiatives and referendums. Donors and recipients include individuals, corporations, political parties, and charitable organizations.

Political campaigns usually involve considerable costs, travel, staff, political consulting, and advertising. Campaign spending depends on the region. For instance, in the United States, television advertising time must be purchased by campaigns, whereas in other countries, it is provided for free. The need to raise money to maintain expensive political campaigns diminishes ties to a representative democracy because of the influence large contributors have over politicians.

Although the political science literature indicates that most contributors give to support parties or candidates with whom they are already in agreement, there is wide public perception that donors expect government favors in return (such as specific legislation being enacted or defeated), so some have come to equate campaign finance with political corruption and bribery. These views have led governments to reform campaign financing in the hope of eliminating big money influence.

== Private financing ==
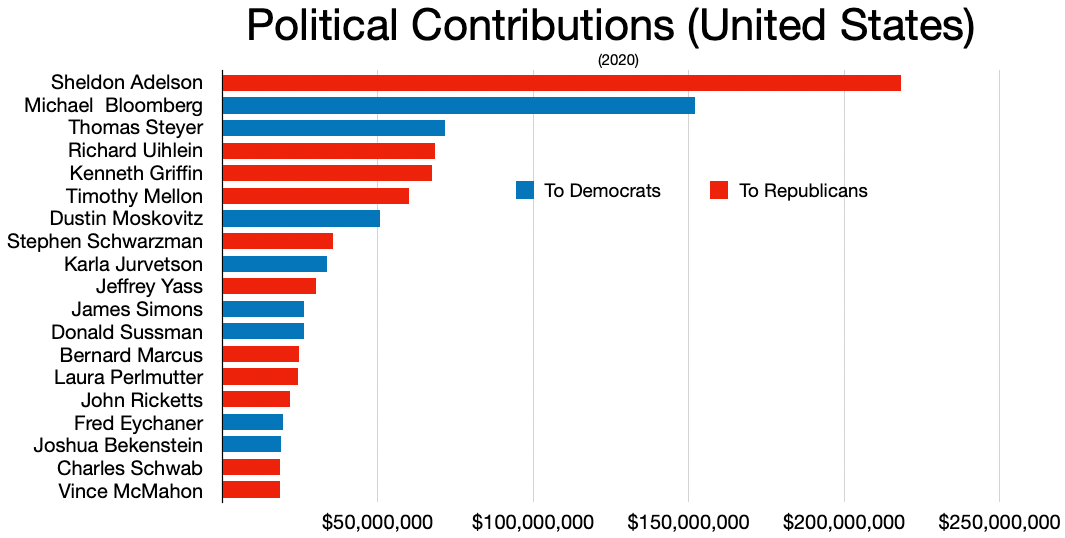
Political donations by major donors in the 2020 US elections

Some countries rely heavily on private donors to finance political campaigns. These kinds of donations can come from private individuals or groups such as trade unions and for-profit corporations. Tactics for raising money may include direct mail solicitation, attempts to encourage supporters to contribute via the Internet, direct solicitation from the candidate, and events specifically for the purpose of fundraising, or other activities.

Fundraising from private donors is often a significant activity for the campaign staff and the candidate, especially in larger and more prominent campaigns. For example, one survey in the United States found that 23% of candidates for statewide office surveyed say that they spent more than half of their scheduled time raising money. Over half of all candidates surveyed spent at least 1/4 of their time on fundraising.

Supporters of private financing systems believe that, in addition to avoiding government limitations on speech, private financing fosters civic involvement, ensures that a diversity of views are heard, and prevents government from tilting the scales to favor those in power or with political influence. Critics of private campaign financing claim that it leads to votes being "bought" and producing large gaps between different parties in the money they have to campaign against. One study finds that political donations gives donors significantly greater access to policymakers. Most countries that rely on private donations to fund campaigns require extensive disclosure of contributions, frequently including information such as the name, employer, and address of donors. This is intended to allow for policing of undue donor influence by other campaigns or by good government groups, while preserving most benefits of private financing, including the right to make donations and to spend money for political speech, saving government the expense of funding campaigns, and keeping government from funding partisan speech that some citizens may find odious. However, in countries such as the United States, "dark money" spent on political campaigns is exempt from disclosure. Dark money spending has mushroomed in recent years in US state and federal elections, amounting to hundreds of millions of dollars in each U.S. presidential election.

== Public financing ==
Other countries choose to use government funding to run campaigns. Funding campaigns from the government budget is widespread in South America and Europe. The mechanisms for this can be quite varied, ranging from direct subsidy of political parties to government matching funds for certain types of private donations (often small donations) to exemption from fees of government services (e.g., postage) and many other systems as well. Supporters of government financing generally believe that the system decreases corruption; in addition, many proponents believe that government financing promotes other values, such as civic participation or greater faith in the political process. Not all government subsidies take the form of money; some systems require campaign materials (often air time on television) to be provided at very low rates to the candidates. Opponents sometimes criticize the expense of the government financing systems, arguing that government should not subsidize political speech.

In many countries, such as Germany and the United States, campaigns can be funded by a combination of private and public money. In the United States, public financing systems include democracy vouchers, matching funds, and lump sum grants, among other system types. Governments, international organizations and scholars are concerned about the funding of campaigns from foreign sources.

In some electoral systems, candidates who win an election or secure a minimum number of ballots are allowed to apply for a rebate to the government. The candidate submits an audited report of the campaign expenses and the government issues a rebate to the candidate, subject to some caps such as the number of votes cast for the candidate or a blanket cap. For example, in the 2008 election, candidates for the Legislative Council of Hong Kong were entitled to a rebate up to HK$11 per vote.

== Regulation ==
The concept of political finance can affect various parts of a society's institutions that support governmental and social success. Correct handling of political finance impacts a country's ability to effectively maintain free and fair elections, effective governance, democratic government and regulation of corruption. The United Nations Convention Against Corruption, recognizing this, encouraged its members to "enhance transparency in the funding of candidatures for elected public office and, when applicable, the funding of political parties." In a study on Global Political Finance Regulation by the International Foundation for Electoral Systems (IFES), researchers Magnus Öhman, Hani Zainulbhai, Jack Santucci, and Marcin Welecki identified several common understandings on what international society has determined integral to the regulation of political finance:

1. Money is necessary for democratic politics, and political parties must have access to funds to play their part in the political process. Regulation must not curb healthy competition.
2. Money is never an unproblematic part of the political system, and regulation is desirable.
3. The context and political culture must be taken into account when devising strategies for controlling money in politics.
4. Effective regulation and disclosure can help to control adverse effects of the role of money in politics, but only if well conceived and implemented.
5. Effective oversight depends on activities in interaction by several stakeholders (such as regulators, civil society and the media) and based on transparency.

Their study also affirmed the perspective laid down by the Council of Europe, when discussing the concept of effective regulation of campaign financing: "[We are] convinced that raising public awareness on the issues of prevention and fight against corruption in the field of funding of political parties is essential to the good functioning of democratic institutions." Campaign finance regulations can reduce political corruption.

== See also ==
- Asset pricing
- Campaign finance in the United States
- Campaign finance reform in the United States
- Clientelism
- Corporate donations § Political donations
- Investment theory of party competition
- Publicly funded elections
- Political funding in the United Kingdom
- Regulatory capture

== Sources ==
- Heard, Alexander (1960). The Costs of Democracy. Chapel Hill, NC: The University of North Carolina Press.
- Ohman, Magnus; Zainulbhai, Hani (2009). Political Finance Regulation: The Global Experience (PDF). Washington, DC: International Foundation for Electoral Systems. ISBN 978-1-931459-42-6. Archived from the original (PDF) on 2011-06-16.
