= Party funding in the Netherlands =

By and large political finance in the Netherlands is a party matter. Compared to other nations the spending level is quite moderate, annually about €2,40 per voter.

== Sources of funds ==
Quite contrary to most other democracies the major source of political money in the Netherlands is membership fees. Even recently membership subscriptions provide about half of all parties' revenue. This heavy reliance on individual party members is a result of the traditional pillarization of Dutch society and politics. As a consequence of living "within one's own circle" citizens supported their own organizations. This resulted in the near absence of contributions from the business community as well as a desire to avoid state intervention and public subsidies as long as possible.

However, for most parties a massive decline of party membership figures has limited the funding potential. Thus in 1973, public subsidies were provided for party political foundations, which were involved in research and training. During the 1990s the four major parties (CDA, PvdA, VVD and D'66) collected between 15 and 35 per cent of their annual revenue from public subsidies. Nowadays dependence on such funds should be higher because the amount of subsidies has been increased since 1999, when public subsidies as a source of funding for the whole range of party activity were instituted by law.

== Items of spending ==
Because Dutch parties enjoy free publicity on the public broadcasting system, they spend much more on their party apparatus than on election campaigns. The major item of party spending is salaries and social benefits for full-time and part-time staff, which account for 30 to 40 per cent of the annual budget. In the late 1980s between 7 and 20 per cent of total expenses were allocated to affiliated organizations, dealing with women, youth, research and training. Quite a bit of the rest is spent on the party journal, which is distributed among the party members.

== Regulation of political money ==
As a consequence of the "pillarized" society with parties acting as the political representative of their "pillar", there was no regulation whatsoever for many years. Parties and lawmakers believed in the autonomy of parties as voluntary associations that was to be preserved at all costs. In 1999 the Law on subsidies to political parties introduced reporting and disclosure obligations for all parties, which receive public subsidies.

Parties receiving public subsidies have to present annual reports on their revenue and expenses to the Minister of the Interior. Such reports have to include names or categories of donors and the amount donated for all donors who are not individuals and have donated in excess of NLG 10,000 (now: €4,538). There are no bans or limits on contributions to parties or candidates or for expenses incurred by either of them.

== Bibliography ==
- Ruud Koole, 'The modesty of Dutch party finance'. In: Herbert E. Alexander (ed.): Comparative Political Finance in the 1980s. Cambridge, UK; Cambridge University Press, 1989, pp. 200–219.
- Ruud Koole, 'Dutch Political Parties: Money and the Message'. In: Herbert E. Alexander and Rei Shiratori (eds.): Comparative Political Finance Among the Democracies, Boulder CO: Westview Press, 1994, pp. 115–131.
- Gullan Gidlund and Ruud Koole, 'Political Finance in the North of Europe (The Netherlands and Sweden)'. In: Karl-Heinz Nassmacher (ed.), Foundations for Democracy, Baden-Baden: Nomos Verlag, 2001, pp. 112–130.
- Lucardie, Paul/ Voerman, Gerrit, 'Party Foundations in the Netherlands', in: Nassmacher, Karl-Heinz (ed.), Foundations for Democracy. Approaches to Comparative Political Finance, Baden-Baden: Nomos, 2001, pp. 321–337.
