= Alice Weidel =

German politician (born 1979)

Alice Weidel MdB
- Weidel in 2025

Leader of the Opposition
- Incumbent
- Assumed office 6 May 2025 Serving with Tino Chrupalla
- Chancellor: Friedrich Merz
- Preceded by: Friedrich Merz
- In office 24 October 2017 – 26 October 2021 Serving with Alexander Gauland
- Chancellor: Angela Merkel
- Preceded by: Sahra Wagenknecht; Dietmar Bartsch
- Succeeded by: Ralph Brinkhaus

Leader of the Alternative for Germany
- Incumbent
- Assumed office 18 June 2022 Serving with Tino Chrupalla
- Deputy: Stephan Brandner; Peter Boehringer; Mariana Harder-Kühnel
- Preceded by: Jörg Meuthen

Leader of the Alternative for Germany in the Bundestag
- Incumbent
- Assumed office 26 September 2017 Serving with Tino Chrupalla
- Deputy: Peter Felser; Leif-Erik Holm; Sebastian Münzenmaier; Beatrix von Storch
- Chief Whip: Bernd Baumann
- Preceded by: Position established

Member of the Bundestag for Baden-Württemberg
- Incumbent
- Assumed office 24 October 2017
- Preceded by: Multi-member district
- Constituency: None

Leader of the Alternative for Germany in Baden-Württemberg
- In office 15 February 2020 – 17 July 2022
- Deputy: Martin Hess; Marc Jongen; Markus Frohnmaier
- Preceded by: Bernd Gögel; Dirk Spaniel
- Succeeded by: Markus Frohnmaier; Emil Sänze

Personal details
- Born: Alice Elisabeth Weidel; 6 February 1979 (age 47) Gütersloh, West Germany
- Party: AfD (since 2013)
- Domestic partner: Sarah Bossard (since 2009)
- Children: 2
- Relatives: Hans Weidel (grandfather)
- Education: University of Bayreuth: Diplom, Economics; Diplom, Business Administration; Dr. rer. pol., Economics
- Scientific career
- Fields: Economics
- Thesis: Das Rentensystem der Volksrepublik China : Reformoptionen aus ordnungstheoretischer Sicht zur Erhöhung der Risikoresistenz (2011)
- Doctoral advisor: Peter Oberender
- Website: alice-weidel.de

Alice Elisabeth Weidel (German: [aˈliːs eˈliːzabɛt ˈvaɪdl̩]; born 6 February 1979) is a German politician who has been serving as co-chairwoman of the far-right Alternative for Germany (AfD) party alongside Tino Chrupalla since June 2022. Since October 2017, she has held the position of leader of the AfD parliamentary group in the Bundestag.

Weidel became a member of the Bundestag (MdB) in the 2017 federal election, where she was the AfD's lead candidate alongside Alexander Gauland. In the 2021 federal election, she once again served as their lead candidate, alongside Tino Chrupalla. From February 2020 to July 2022, Weidel held the position of chairwoman of the AfD state association in Baden-Württemberg. In 2024, she was selected as her party's candidate for Chancellor in the 2025 German federal election.

== Early life and career ==
Alice Elisabeth Weidel was born on 6 February 1979 in Gütersloh, North Rhine-Westphalia, West Germany, as the youngest of three children of Gerhard and Margitta Weidel. She grew up in Harsewinkel and graduated from a Christliches Jugenddorfwerk Deutschlands (CJD) Gymnasium in Versmold, in 1998.

Weidel studied economics and business administration at the University of Bayreuth and graduated as one of the best in the year in 2004. After receiving her undergraduate degree, Weidel went on to work as an asset management analyst for Goldman Sachs from July 2005 to June 2006 in Frankfurt. In the late 2000s, she worked at the Bank of China, and lived for six years in China. Subsequently, she wrote a doctoral thesis with the health economist Peter Oberender at the Faculty of Law and Economics in Bayreuth on the future of the Chinese pension system. In 2011, she received a doctorate in international development. She received her doctorate magna cum laude. Her doctorate was supported by the Konrad Adenauer Foundation, the political party foundation associated with, but independent of, the Christian Democratic Union (CDU), as well as the German Academic Exchange Service.

From March 2011 to May 2013, Weidel worked as Vice President at Allianz Global Investors in Frankfurt. Since 2014, she has worked as a freelance business consultant. In 2015, she worked for Rocket Internet and Foodora. As of 2016, Weidel was a member of the Friedrich A. von Hayek Society.

== Politics ==
=== Alternative for Germany ===
Weidel joined the Alternative for Germany (AfD) in October 2013. According to Weidel, she was first attracted to the party due to her opposition to the euro. She was elected to the federal executive committee of the AfD in June 2015. In April 2017, she was elected co-lead candidate of the party. She is the first lesbian to serve as a lead candidate of her party. She has been identified by the media as belonging to the more moderate conservative Alternative Mitte faction within the AfD.

The Switzerland-based property billionaire Henning Conle supported AfD. He donated a total of 132,000 euros by means of straw men for the 2017 federal election campaign of Alice Weidel. Conle disguised his donation from Switzerland in 18 tranches. The AfD had to pay the Bundestag a high fine for this donation, but Weidel and three other officials went unpunished. A German-wide record-setting donation of 2.35 million euros to AfD by local Austrian FPÖ politician Gerhard Dingler in early 2025 has been identified as being linked to Conle. If substantiated, such a donation would break both German and Austrian laws and would be heavily penalized.

In January 2024, Weidel fired advisor Roland Hartwig after he attended a controversial meeting with German far-right activists in which plans to deport millions of people living in Germany were discussed.

== Political positions ==
Weidel describes herself as a libertarian conservative, although media mostly describes her as a far-right politician.

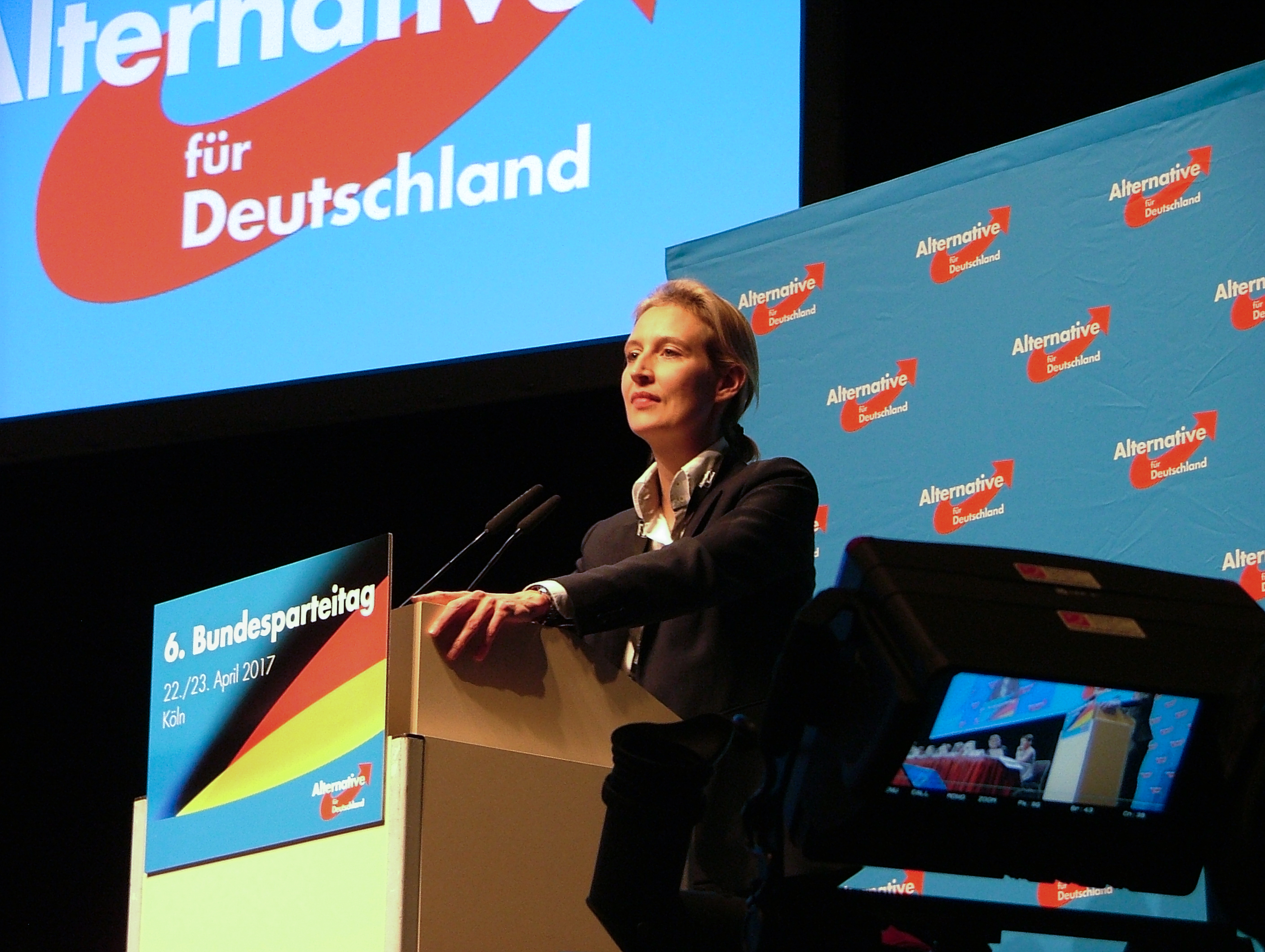
Weidel in 2017

=== European Union and economic issues ===
Weidel vigorously defends economic liberalism and declares former UK Prime Minister Margaret Thatcher to be her role model.

In terms of economic policy, Weidel argued against the abolition of cash. During the euro area crisis, she called for economically weak states, such as Greece, Spain, and Portugal to leave or be expelled from the Eurozone.

Weidel expresses support for tax cuts and the abolition of inheritance tax and opposes the minimum wage.

Weidel supports continued German membership in the European Union; however, in an interview with the Financial Times published in January 2024, Weidel outlined her party's approach in the event of a government takeover: if an attempt by the AfD to resolve the EU's "democratic deficit" were unsuccessful, Germany's exit from the EU would be put to a vote following the example of Great Britain. Leading economists consider this to be the economic worst-case scenario. In 2015, she also spoke out in favor of Germany leaving the euro/Eurozone and called for a return to a gold-backed currency. In early 2025 she indicated that she no longer believes in a return to the Deutsche Mark, saying it would be "far too late to leave the euro". Thereby she relativized her party's demands for a return to national currency, which the AfD laid out in its programme for the 2025 federal election. However, she forecasted that the Euro would be abolished in an unorganized manner and that this would cost huge amounts of wealth.

During the AfD party conference in June 2024, she said that it was in the interests of Germany and Europe that "Ukraine does not belong to the European Union".

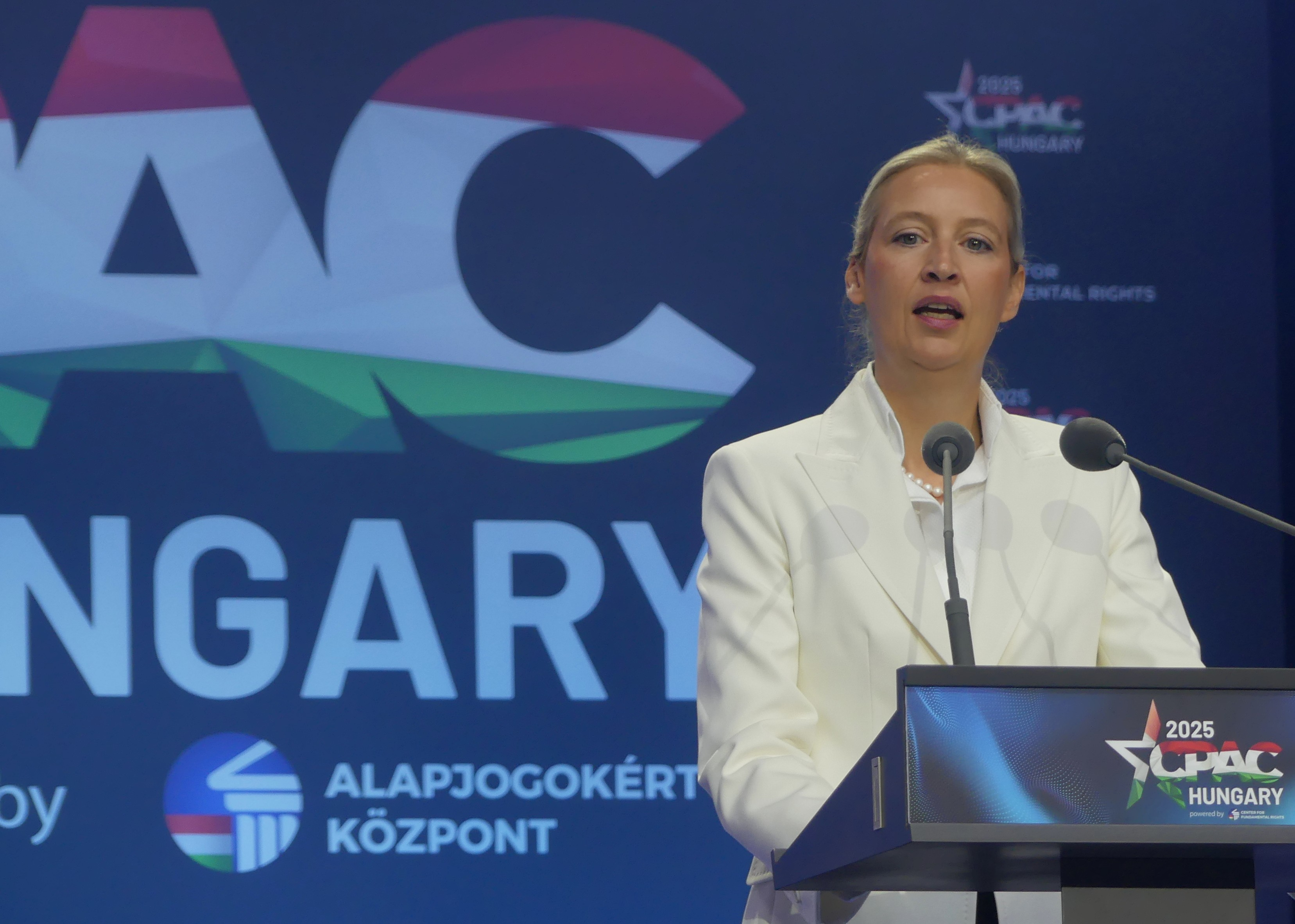
Addressing CPAC Hungary 2025

Since 2025, the AfD has been working with Hungary's nationalist and right-wing populist Prime Minister Viktor Orbán. Weidel praised Hungary as a model for the AfD, saying that the AfD shares Hungary's opposition to illegal immigration and stance on the European Union. In February 2025, Weidel stated about the AfD's policy towards the European Union: "We should work together to reform the European Union at all costs. And that can only be done from within. We can achieve this by reducing the competences of the European Union, by dismantling the entire bureaucratic, expensive – and, in my view, corrupt – superstructure." In October 2026, she said it was a "myth" that AfD wants to leave the Euro. She also said that cutting energy subsidies, foreign aid and welfare could pay for tax cuts and debt reduction, though she accepted Germany would spend higher on defense.

=== Asylum and integration policy ===
In December 2016, Weidel said that German chancellor Angela Merkel was "of course" partly responsible for the rape and murder of Maria Ladenburger.

In 2017, Weidel criticized the immigration policies of Merkel, stating that "the country will be destroyed through this immigration policy. Donald Trump said that Merkel is insane and I absolutely agree with that. It is a completely nonsensical form of politics that is being followed here." Weidel saw Merkel's asylum policy as a violation of "international agreements". Weidel called for a "Fortress Europe" and "effective development aid". Weidel opposes health insurance for asylum seekers, criticises what she sees as a "naive approach" to radical Islamic preachers in Germany and has warned against excessive expectations regarding the integration of refugees into the labour market. In the context of the German refugee debate, she speaks of an incalculable burden on the economy and the welfare state, and that voters of established parties (CDU/CSU and SPD) have, in her opinion, "lost their minds". According to her, "no important question of our time [...] can be separated from the migration question". Weidel wants to ban the burqa and niqāb and has also spoken out in favour of a headscarf ban: the headscarf should be "banned from public spaces and the streets" because it is an "absolutely sexist symbol" and represents an "apartheid between men and women".

She has called for the German government to invest in "special economic zones" in the Middle East to encourage educated and skilled persons to remain in their home countries and avoid the possibility of brain drain, but also says she supports a "Canadian-style system" which would prioritize skilled, over unskilled, immigrants. In October 2026, she said remigration means deporting failed asylum-seekers. She said that since the Syrian civil war concluded, "100% of the Syrian citizens" must return, as well as Afghans and Ukrainians after peace is achieved, estimating that around "four to five million" would have to leave Germany. She added that "professionals who want to work here" would be welcome and said the foreign workers Germany should attract were put off by the failure of integration.

=== Foreign policy and international relations ===
==== General stance ====
In October 2022, she said that the AfD slogan "Our country first" (based on the "French first" of the Front National under Jean-Marie Le Pen) called for "not a values-based foreign policy", but "an interest-driven foreign policy for our country". She retaliated the call for a "Germany first" policy in October 2026.

==== Russia and Ukraine ====
According to Weidel, Germany had damaged itself and was being "crushed between the major powers" with its sanctions policy against Russia. The "big loser", according to Weidel, would not be Russia or Ukraine, but Germany, because "an economic war is being waged against Germany". Although the Russian attack on Ukraine was "contrary to international law", she sees no need to "interfere", because what it ultimately meant for Ukraine and for Russia, for the division of territory, was "not our issue at all". Putting President Vladimir Putin before a war crimes tribunal is "completely unrealistic", according to Weidel. The hostilities must stop and Ukraine must also be "held accountable" because it cannot be "that the West accepts the Ukrainian maximum demands without thinking about it".

Although advocating for economic relations with Russia, Weidel is not considered to be part of the AfD pro-Russia movement; Weidel responded to the question why she – unlike her co-chair Tino Chrupalla – did not attend the Russian embassy's reception to celebrate the anniversary of the victory over Nazi Germany: "Celebrating the defeat of one's own country with a former occupying power is something I have personally decided – also with my father's escape story – not to take part in." Weidel has also criticised Russian violations of NATO airspace and suggested that Putin had not made adequate concessions in negotiations with the United States, warning that this could undermine U.S. President Donald Trump's faith in the negotiations. Weidel also denounced plans by a group of her AfD colleagues to attend an international conference in Sochi in November 2024, stating, "I myself would not travel there, nor would I recommend it to anyone" and agreed to change the party's procedures for approving travel.

In September 2026, Weidel said that German Chancellor Friedrich Merz should "finally start pushing for peace talks, like the US is doing". She added "We need cheap natural gas from Russia. That is what we will work toward". Weidel has called for end to German aid to Ukraine. In an October 2026 interview with The Economist, she said that Ukraine was "too small" and had "already lost" the Russo-Ukrainian war, and that Germany should put "pressure on the Ukrainian president" to end the bloodshed. She added that the continuation of the war "endangers Germany" as it could become a target. Regarding the 2026 Leipzig Airport drone attack, she said she had seen no evidence that Russia was behind the "so-called attempted drone attack". When asked if Putin wants peace, she asked whether Zelenskyy wanted it. While she accepted Russia as culpable for the war, she said "when diplomacy is at the table, history is sitting there too" and that the West had not paid sufficient attention to Russia's security concerns.

==== Middle East ====
In contrast to her AfD co-leader Tino Chrupalla, Weidel expressed support for Israel in context to the Gaza war. During an interview with Elon Musk she said she supported the state of Israel and its right to self-defense but expressed uncertainty on how to resolve the conflict between Israel and Palestine.

==== United States ====
In early 2025, in an interview with The American Conservative, she said regarding the demand of US president Donald Trump that Germany had to increase its military spending, while allegedly having to stay under the political influence of the US, that the US could not have it both ways. She compared Germany with a slave and said that "slaves don’t fight. A slave who fights will invariably demand freedom as a reward." Weidel said that, if Germany has to take responsibility for its own security in the future, this comes with the price of independence from the US, especially regarding energy policy, Nord Stream in particular.

=== COVID-19 pandemic ===
During the COVID-19 pandemic in Germany, Weidel's stance changed. In March 2020, she said that COVID-19 could "spread unhindered" in Germany, while all EU countries were "practically shutting down public life." This would have "fatal consequences" for Germany, and the government must "finally take appropriate steps now." She spoke of a "negligent game with the lives and health of our citizens," because, according to everything we know, the virus "poses a higher risk of infection and a greater risk of mortality than the common flu." After the shutdown, however Weidel called for the economy to be restarted "immediately"; the "chaos policy of the federal government" was "disastrous." At the end of May 2020 she called the federal government's Corona policy "pre-democratic" and accused it of "a blanket restriction of basic rights and then distributing them again piecemeal as if by an act of mercy". After party leader Jörg Meuthen had criticized the party for showing too much solidarity with the COVID-19 protests in Germany, Weidel said that she could "recommend to anyone who tries to defame this movement to simply attend a demonstration. She described the Infection Protection Act as unconstitutional; therefore, they "were right to take to the streets".

In July 2021, Weidel stated that she would not be vaccinated against COVID-19 for the foreseeable future and complained that healthy unvaccinated people in Germany were being discriminated against – she also did not believe in an implied vaccination requirement. In mid-November 2021, she contracted COVID-19 and had to go into quarantine at home. In an interview with journalist Erhard Scherfer for the Phoenix on 8 December 2021, Weidel emphatically denied his statement that the majority of hospital intensive care units were unvaccinated. When asked where she obtained the figures, Weidel cited the Federal Statistical Office as her source. The Federal Office itself, however, quickly clarified that it did not have such data at all, which triggered considerable media attention. At an AfD event in Heilbronn in March 2024, Weidel asked who actually takes responsibility "for all the vaccine-damaged people, who are in wheelchairs, who have died."

=== LGBTQ issues ===
Weidel has said she supports civil partnership for gay and lesbian couples, noting she is a lesbian herself and in a civil partnership with another woman, Sarah Bossard. She opposes legalization of same-sex marriage, stating that she supports protecting the "traditional family". Weidel and Bossard have two children.

She combines this position with her negative attitude towards asylum in Germany and Islam. Weidel said that she sees family policy as more liberal than her party: "Family is where children are." She has stated her opposition to discussion of sexuality prior to puberty saying that "I don't want anyone with their gender idiocy or their early sexualisation classes coming near my children."

=== German churches ===
At the end of 2017, Weidel accused the two biggest churches in Germany, the Catholic Church and the Protestant Church, of "playing the same inglorious role that they played in the Third Reich", accusing both churches of being "thoroughly politicized" and stating that AfD is "the only Christian party that still exists" in Germany. Such statements were dismissed by the Catholic German Bishops' Conference and the Evangelical Church as "polemics" and "derailment".

=== Global warming ===
Weidel has expressed doubts about global warming; in 2019, Weidel expressed that she did not believe "that human influence on global warming is decisive." The AfD had previously modified its position on this during the election campaign for the 2019 European elections and spoke of signs of human influence. Weidel cited the Danish physicist Henrik Svensmark, who believes that the influence of carbon dioxide (CO_{2}) on the climate is overestimated. Weidel's press officer named the geophysicist Eigil Friis-Christensen, who worked at the NBI until 2006, as another source besides Svensmark. However, his research on this subject, which was taken up by Weidel and other climate skeptics, is unsubstantiated.

With regard to the Fridays for Future rallies, Weidel spoke of "this campaigning ability that is rolling towards us," and said: "The power of this cumulative stupidity is frightening."

At the AfD party conference in Riesa in January 2025, Weidel said that an AfD government would "naturally bring functioning nuclear power plants back online"; she called for longer operating times for coal-fired power plants. She also promised to restart Nord Stream to supply Russian gas through the Baltic Sea. She also said that a government with her participation would "tear down all wind turbines," calling them "windmills of shame."

== Controversies ==
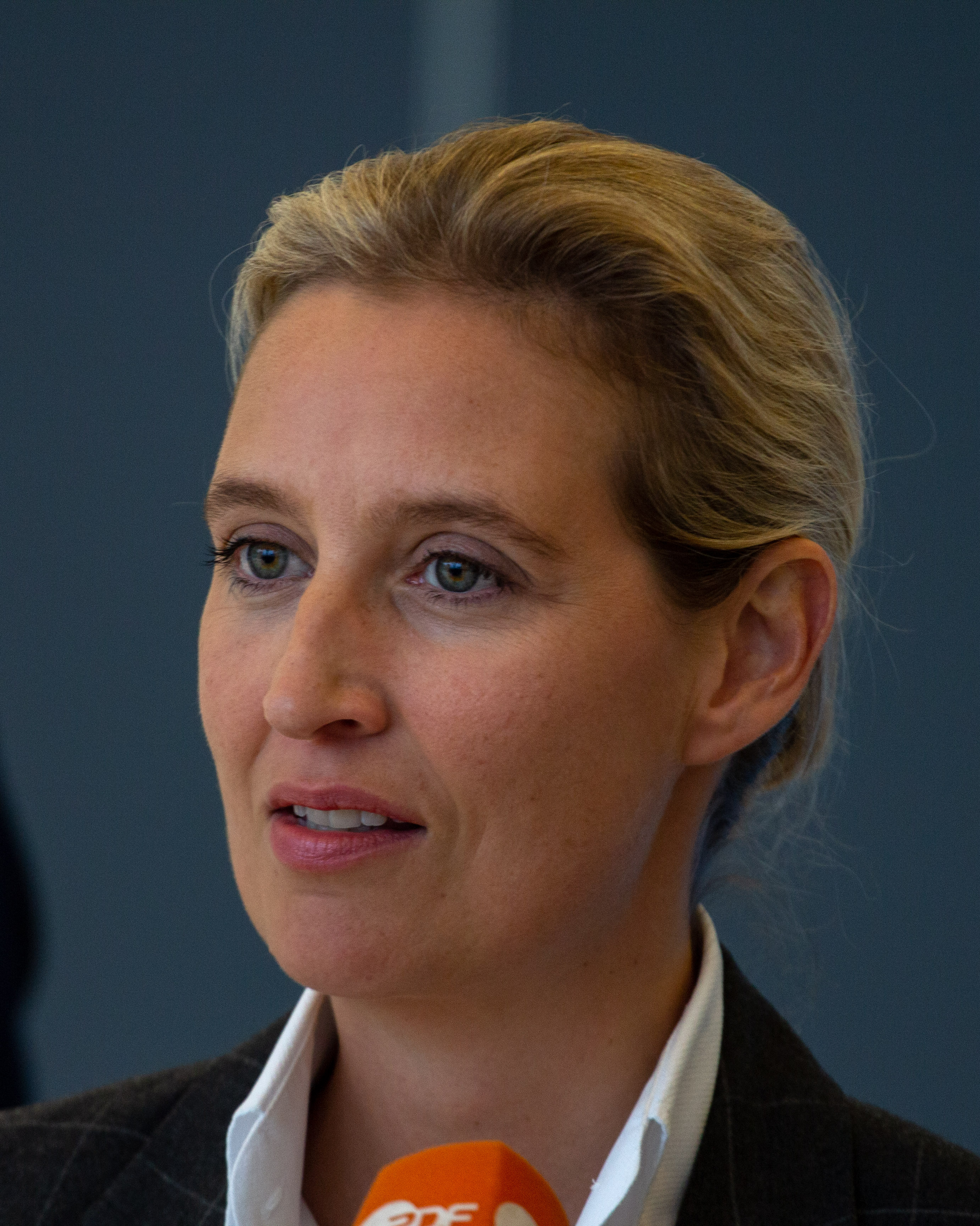
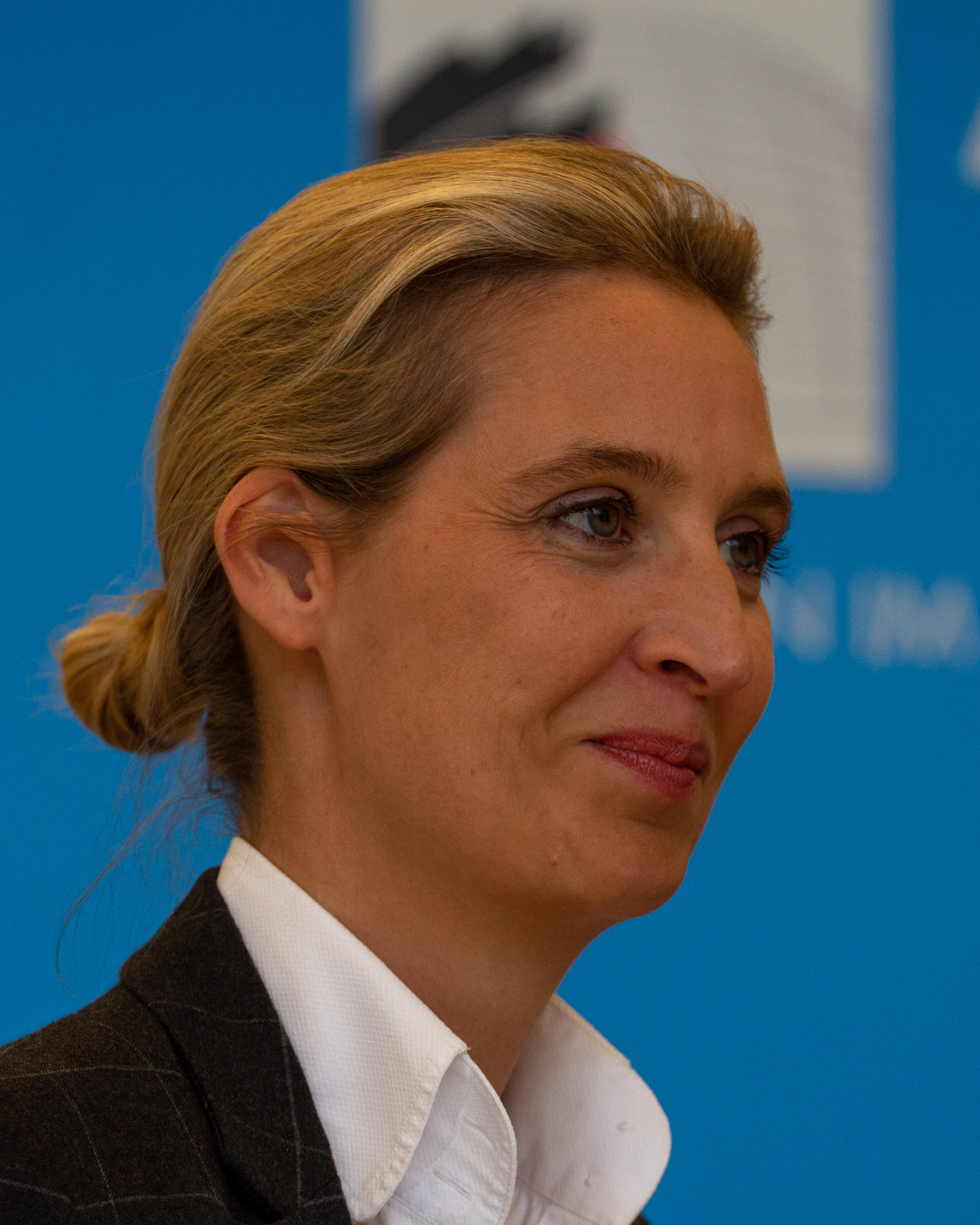
Weidel in 2019

=== "Political correctness" incident ===
In April 2017, Weidel railed against political correctness, saying that it belonged in the "dustbin of history". In response, on 27 April, TV presenter Christian Ehring of the satire program extra 3 addressed this, saying: "That's right! Let's put an end to political correctness. The Nazi slut is right. Was this incorrect enough? I hope so!" Weidel sued the channel seeking to forbid re-airing of the program, and on 17 May the Hamburg District Court ruled against her, stating that a public figure must tolerate exaggerated criticism. Weidel disagreed with the decision and promised to bring it to the Oberlandesgericht (Higher Regional Court). As of September 2017, no further action had taken place.

=== Alleged illegal immigration incident ===
A September 2017 report by Die Zeit alleged that Weidel had illegally hired a Syrian refugee to do housework at her home in Switzerland. The report also alleged that the asylum seeker did not have a written work contract, nor were there invoices for her work. Weidel responded in a tweet that the Die Zeit report was "fake news" and "false" and Weidel's lawyer stated that Weidel had a Syrian stay at her home as a guest but not as a worker.

=== Allegations of border revisionism ===
In June 2023, Weidel commented on the election polls results in former East Germany without Berlin, stating that AfD has great support in this region. However, she referred to the region as Mitteldeutschland (Central Germany), which was seen by some in Poland as suggesting that the so-called Recovered Territories belong to Germany, which caused controversies with the Polish politician Beata Szydło.

=== Remarks about migrants and generational replacement ===
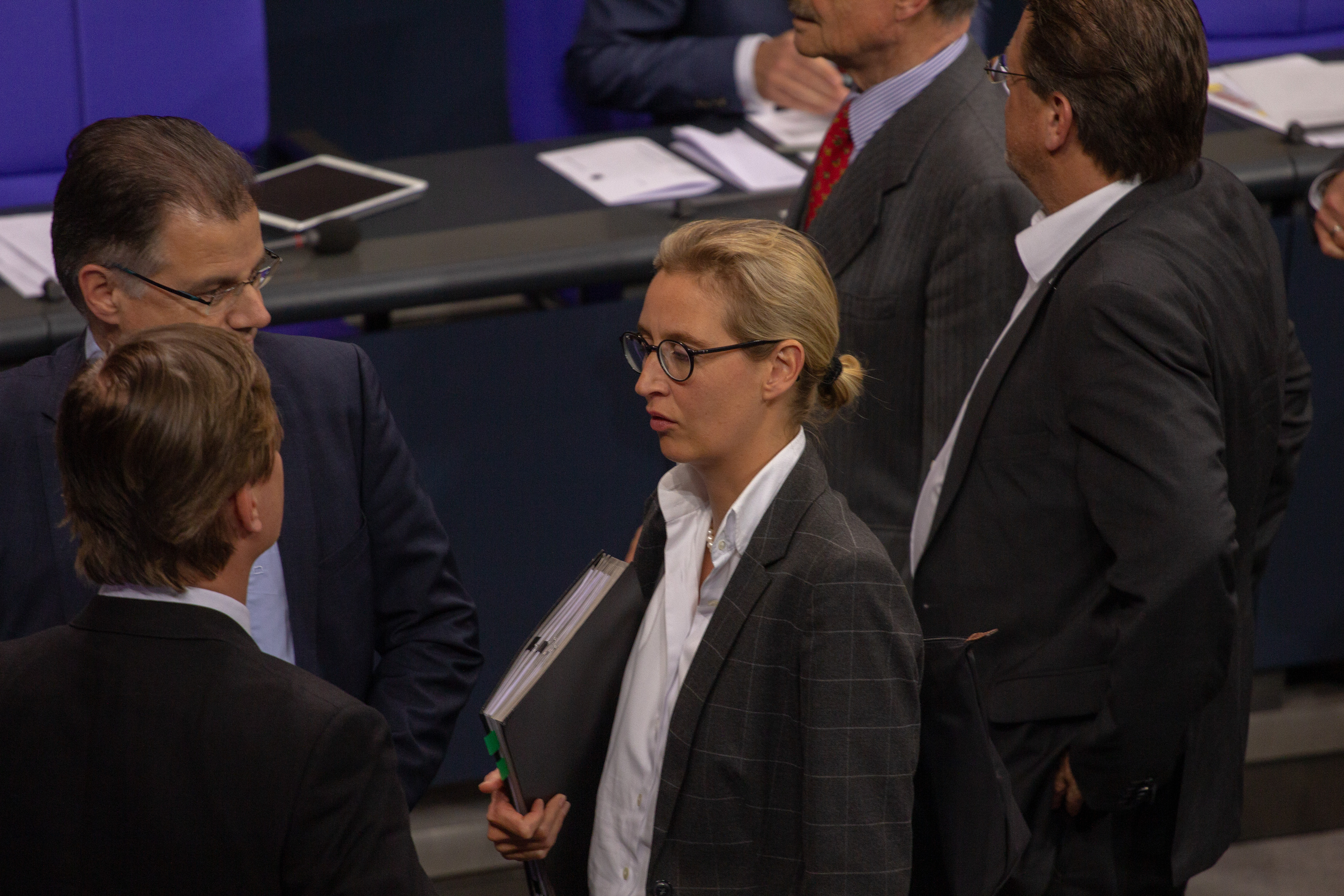
Weidel in 2019 in the Bundestag

In May 2018, Weidel was reprimanded by Wolfgang Schäuble (CDU), the then President of the Bundestag, after Weidel made the following statement in a speech in the Bundestag: "Burkas, girls in headscarves, knifemen on subsidies and other good-for-nothings will not secure our prosperity, economic growth and, above all, the welfare state." These remarks were sharply criticized. Weidel subsequently stated in an interview that she had in no way intended these terms as a provocation against all women who wear a headscarf.

In the same speech, Weidel also spoke of an "increase in the population through immigrant criminals with multiple identities" and a "strategy of generational replacement through unregulated immigration" and accused the government of wanting to "select and assemble the people themselves". This was interpreted as a reference to the "Great Replacement" theory.

=== Hitler's political views ===
On 9 January 2025, in a live broadcast with Elon Musk on X Spaces, both Weidel and Musk said that "Hitler was a communist". The classification of Hitler and the National Socialists as "left" and "socialist" is rejected by the vast majority of historical research.

== Personal life ==
Weidel is openly a lesbian. Since 2009, she has been in a relationship with Sarah Bossard, a Sri Lankan-born film producer who was adopted as a child by a Swiss couple.

The couple has two sons, born biologically to Sarah and adopted by Alice. Since 2019 Sarah and the children live in Einsiedeln, Switzerland, while Alice lives primarily in Berlin. According to Weidel, her partner is a very devout Christian and her sons are being raised as Christians. But in terms of her religion, Weidel identifies herself as an agnostic though she said in an interview in May 2025 that she is "fascinated" by the question of God and further stated that she "would like to believe" but she needs more time.

Weidel works in Berlin and says her official residence is in her electoral district in Überlingen, on the German side of the German-Swiss border, allowing her to avoid Swiss taxation.

On her father's side, Weidel's family came from Neustadt and Leobschütz in Upper Silesia, in what is now Poland. Her grandfather Hans Weidel was a member of the SS and a military judge in Nazi Germany. He joined the NSDAP at the end of 1932 and the SS in January 1933. Weidel's father was born 1939 in Upper Silesia and fled with his mother and sister to Verl (in East Westphalia) in February 1945. He founded a sales agency for office furniture in 1972 and worked as a sales representative for furniture, furnishings and antiques.

== Selected publications ==
- Das Rentensystem der Volksrepublik China. Reformoptionen aus ordnungstheoretischer Sicht zur Erhöhung der Risikoresistenz (Schriften zur Nationalökonomie. Band 60). Verlag P.C.O., Bayreuth 2011, ISBN 978-3-941678-25-5.

Political offices
Preceded by Sahra Wagenknecht and Dietmar Bartsch	Leader of the Opposition; 2017–2021; With: Tino Chrupalla	Succeeded by Ralph Brinkhaus
Preceded by Friedrich Merz	Leader of the Opposition; 2025–present With: Alexander Gauland	Incumbent
Party political offices
Preceded by Bernd Gögel and Dirk Spaniel	Leader of the Alternative for Germany in Baden-Württemberg; 2020–2022	Succeeded by Markius Frohnmaier and Emil Sänze
Preceded by Jörg Meuthen	Leader of the Alternative for Germany; 2022–present With: Tino Chrupalla	Incumbent
