= Tino Chrupalla =

German politician (born 1975)

Tino Chrupalla MdB
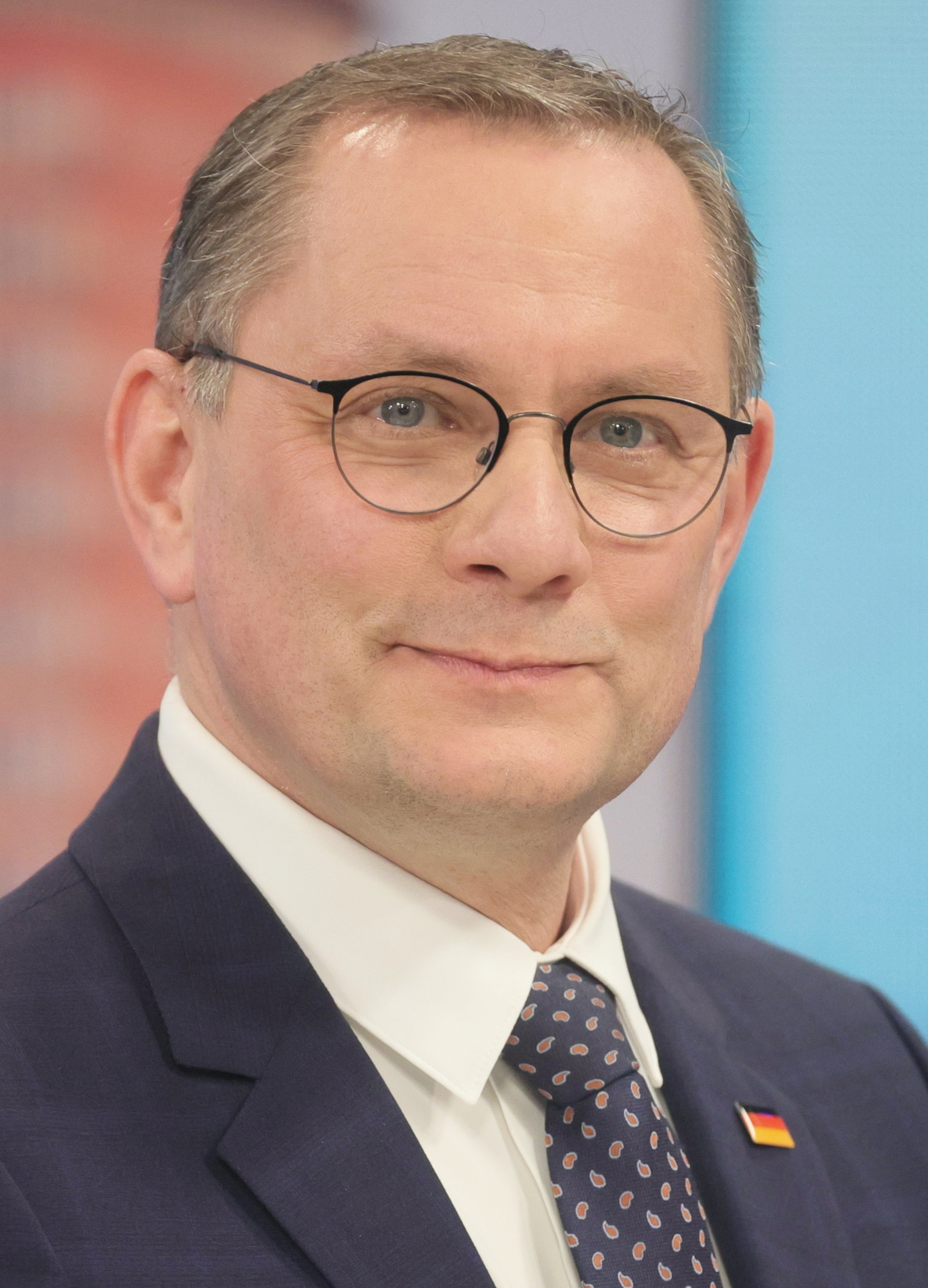
- Chrupalla in 2025

Leader of the Opposition
- Incumbent
- Assumed office 6 May 2025 Serving with Alice Weidel
- Chancellor: Friedrich Merz
- Preceded by: Friedrich Merz

Leader of the Alternative for Germany in the Bundestag
- Incumbent
- Assumed office 30 September 2021 Serving with Alice Weidel
- Deputy: Peter Felser; Leif-Erik Holm; Sebastian Münzenmaier; Beatrix von Storch
- Chief Whip: Bernd Baumann
- Preceded by: Alexander Gauland

Leader of the Alternative for Germany
- Incumbent
- Assumed office 30 November 2019 Serving with Alice Weidel
- Deputy: Stephan Brandner; Peter Boehringer; Mariana Harder-Kühnel
- Preceded by: Alexander Gauland

Member of the Bundestag for Görlitz
- Incumbent
- Assumed office 24 October 2017
- Preceded by: Michael Kretschmer

Personal details
- Born: 14 April 1975 (age 51) Weißwasser, Bezirk Cottbus, East Germany
- Party: Alternative for Germany
- Children: 3

Tino Chrupalla (German: [ˈtiːno kʁʊˈpala]; born 14 April 1975) is a German politician from the far-right party Alternative for Germany (AfD). A member of the German parliament (Bundestag) since 2017, he has served as co-chairman of the AfD since 2019 along with Alice Weidel. In November 2019, Chrupalla was nominated by Alexander Gauland to replace the latter as co-chairman of the AfD; he later won election as co-chair.

== Biography ==
Chrupalla was born on 14 April 1975 in Weißwasser, then part of East Germany. In 2003, he completed state professional exams to become a painter and decorator. He later became the owner of a building company. Chrupalla is married with three children.

In March 2020, Chrupalla's car caught fire on his property in Gablenz, a town in northeastern Saxony. The local police suspected arson, but nobody was ever charged in connection with the incident. Chrupalla condemned the act as a direct attack on his family, one that went beyond politics.

In October 2023, Chrupalla was hospitalised following a suspected attack with a syringe that occurred shortly before he was due to speak at an election rally. The incident came just days after AfD's other co-leader, Alice Weidel, cancelled a public rally due to concerns that her family would also be attacked. A witness told the local daily Donaukurier that Chrupalla had taken a few selfies before he collapsed and was transported to hospital. Andreas Aichele, a spokesman for the Upper Bavaria Police Department, said it remained unclear whether the politician had been attacked, had fallen, or was simply not feeling well. Aichele said authorities ruled nothing out and that the investigation was ongoing.

== Political career ==
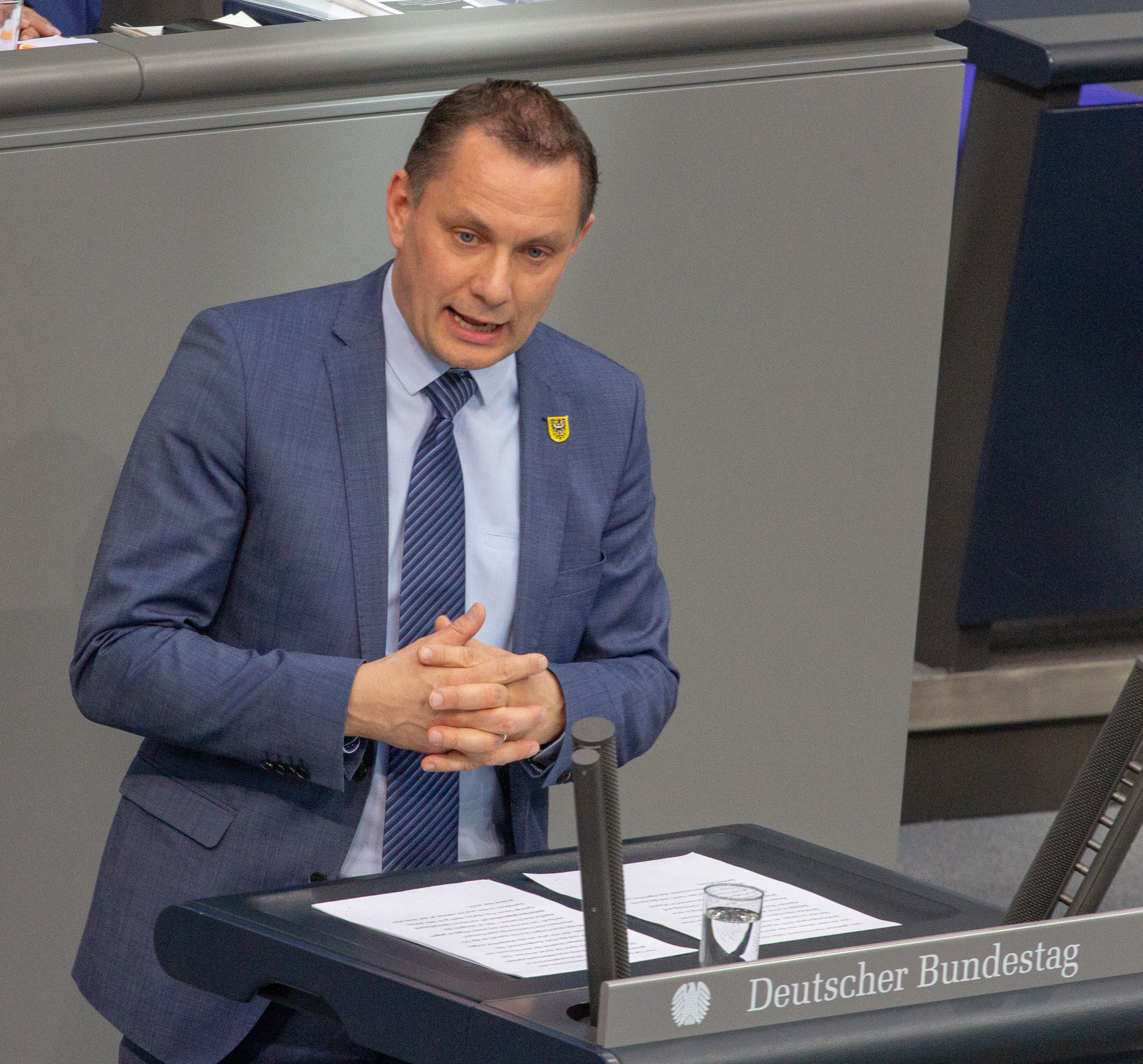
Chrupalla in 2019

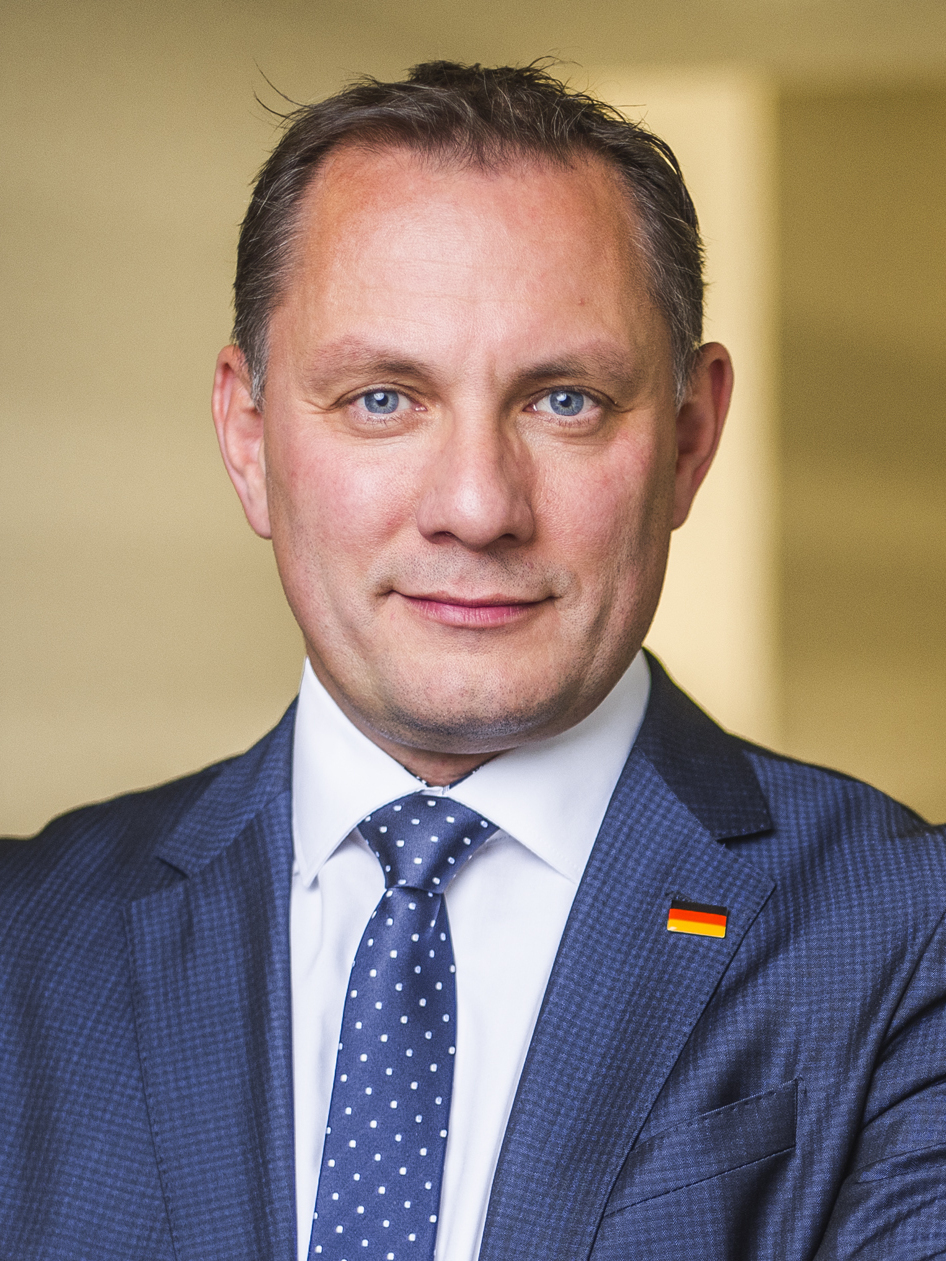
Chrupalla in 2020

During the 1990s, Tino Chrupalla joined the Christian Democratic Youth, which was linked to the CDU. He entered the AfD in 2015, and was elected to its district committee for Görlitz in 2016. In the German federal election the following year, he defeated Michael Kretschmer (later Minister-President of Saxony) in the electoral district of Görlitz.

Chrupalla is one of five deputy chief whips of the AfD's federal parliamentary group.

Ahead of the 2021 German federal election, Chrupalla was the AfD's leading candidate for the Bundestag alongside Alice Weidel. Together with Weidel, he was elected group leader of the AfD parliamentary group in the Bundestag on 30 September 2021, replacing Alexander Gauland. Gauland would remain as honorary chairman as part of a redefinition of the office.

== Political views ==
The German newspaper Die Zeit has characterised Chrupalla as one of the relatively more moderate members of the AfD's faction in the Bundestag. Just before the 2021 German federal election, Chrupalla cited border security as his main concern, calling for Germany to reinstate border controls to "curb border crime". As federal spokesman for his party, Chrupalla repeatedly called on the AfD to unite and "stop thinking in camps".

In a Bundestag debate on 8 November 2019 about the 30 years since the fall of the Berlin Wall, Chrupalla caused a stir when he accused Germany's then chancellor, Angela Merkel, of having learned through her membership in East Germany's Free German Youth how to keep other citizens in check using propaganda and agitation. Chrupalla added that this could be achieved with "strategies of domination and disintegration." With his views on foreign policy, Chrupalla belongs to the AfD pro-Russia movement.

=== Foreign policy ===
In 2017, Chrupalla called for an end to the sanctions imposed on Russia following Russia's annexation of Crimea in 2014, because the economy of his district was suffering as a result.

In February 2020, in the run-up to the 75th anniversary of the Bombing of Dresden in World War II, Chrupalla cast doubt on the figure of around 25,000 fatalities determined by a commission of historians headed by Rolf-Dieter Müller between 2004 and 2010. Referring to reports from relatives who were eyewitnesses in Dresden in 1945, he assumes around 100,000 fatalities, Chrupalla told Der Spiegel. Rolf-Dieter Müller and historian Sven Felix Kellerhoff criticised these statements, which contradict the scientifically based findings of the commission; Chrupalla is thus basing his calculations on figures that come from Joseph Goebbels' propaganda and are only postulated by history falsifiers such as David Irving, the NPD and other right-wing extremists.

In June 2021, Chrupalla travelled to Moscow with several other AfD MPs to mark the 80th anniversary of the Wehrmacht's attack on the Soviet Union and laid a wreath there. Chrupalla told the German Press Agency in Moscow about his visit: "It was important to me personally to send a sign of reconciliation. [...] Unfortunately, I was the only representative from Germany who laid a wreath here." During another visit to Moscow a few weeks later Chrupalla – at the invitation of the Russian Defense Ministry – gave a speech at a conference in which he spoke of the Western Allies' "psychological warfare" right after World War II. He alleged that the Allied victors' reeducation (de) of ordinary Germans after the war had had a lasting impact on the country's national identity. Chrupalla also compared the policies of the Allies after 1945 with Nazi propaganda.

After Russia's invasion of Ukraine in February 2022, Chrupalla said that "[t]his war also has several fathers. ... Of course, the role of NATO and the role of the federal government of Germany must also be discussed here." With regard to the war in Ukraine, Chrupalla said at the political talk show Markus Lanz in November 2022 that Russian President Putin was "not a war criminal"; "labeling" him as such would not help anyone. The competent courts would have to answer the question of war crimes "after the war". Chrupalla also said that there are "American presidents who are just as much war criminals" and mentioned George W. Bush and his Iraq War. Chrupalla also spoke out against arms deliveries to Ukraine, because they would not "pacify or end the conflict, but rather prolong it" and weapons systems delivered to Ukraine would "also be fired on Russian territory". Therefore, a ceasefire and peace talks must be held "as soon as possible". In the same talk show, Chrupalla suggested that the Nord Stream pipelines sabotage was benefiting the USA in a way that he found suspicious, as they had an interest in selling expensive gas to Germany. Hunter Biden had a "key role" in the conflict, but he [Chrupalla] could only guess which one and therefore did not elaborate. Germany does not only have friends in the West, according to Chrupalla, but the German government is not interested in clarifying what happened. Chrupalla had previously explained Russia's aggressive warfare in Ukraine by saying that "every reaction results in a counter-reaction" and that Putin reacts to Ukrainian strikes like the 2022 Crimean Bridge explosion. After the German government announced at the end of January 2023 that it would supply Leopard 2 battle tanks to Ukraine, Chrupalla said that this would mean "walking blindly straight into open fire, I have to say it openly, straight into World War III".

In March 2023, he said in the Bundestag that Russia and Ukraine were losing the war together, and that "there is only one winner again, and that winner is the USA."

In May 2023, he attended a reception at the Embassy of Russia, Berlin on the occasion of Russian Victory Day together with former Chancellor Gerhard Schröder, Klaus Ernst, Egon Krenz and Alexander Gauland, wearing a tie in the colors of the Russian tricolor. In response to criticism from the AfD in a chat with high-ranking AfD politicians, he objected that, contrary to what had been reported, he had not thanked the Russian ambassador for the liberation from National Socialism. In response to the German magazine Secession, he made his position clear by saying that the Russian concept of victory over Germany seemed unproblematic to him: "It was not so much about dissolving the patriotism of the Germans or burdening us with an indelible guilt." The Russians withdrew in 1994 and good "economic relations on an equal footing" had been established. But the “Americans have stayed and are keeping our country economically dependent – to the detriment of the citizens.”

At a speech by Ukrainian President Volodymyr Zelenskyy in the Bundestag in 2024, Chrupalla and Weidel declared that they refused to "listen to a speaker in camouflage". Zelenskyy's term of office had "expired" and he was "only in office as a war and begging president". The parliamentary group executive committee of the AfD had therefore decided not to attend the speech. Chrupalla supported peace negotiations on the Russo-Ukrainian War with the participation of Russia.

In an interview with Die Welt in December 2024, Chrupalla questioned Germany's NATO membership. A defence community must not only pursue the "interests of America," but must "accept and respect those of all European countries - including Russia's interests." Germany may need to consider "to what extent this alliance is still useful for us." Chrupalla also called on the German government to recognize Russia's victory in the Ukraine war. Russia had "won this war" and "reality" had "caught up with those who claim to want to enable Ukraine to win the war." The German government, said Chrupalla, must "finally get to the point of wanting to end the war."

In January 2025, Chrupalla accepted an invitation from the Republican Party and attended the second inauguration of Donald Trump in Washington, D.C.

In February 2025, some high-ranking AfD members criticised Chrupalla's pro-Moscow position on foreign policy.

In 2026, in the midst of the 2026 Iran war, Chrupalla praised Spain's refusal to allow American forces to use its military bases for the conflict, and urged Germany to follow Spain's example. He further proposed ending the stationing of US forces in Germany, as well as their nuclear weapons presence in the country.

=== China ===
Chrupalla has voiced opposition to restrictions on Chinese technology, and in 2023 backed Chinese foreign minister Qin Gang in his efforts to broker a peace in Ukraine after Russia's invasion.

=== Serbia ===
In November 2023, Chrupalla and his fellow Bundestag AfD member Petr Bystron met with Milica Đurđević Stamenkovski, leader of the Serbian far-right party Oathkeepers. At the invitation of AfD, Stamenkovski visited the Bundestag in Berlin and affirmed the AfD as "leading a sovereignist and state-building option in Germany".

=== Israel ===
In 2024, the AfD reversed its previously pro-Israel position, with Chrupalla calling for an end to Germany's current relationship with Israel, which Chrupalla described as "one-sided", as well as an end to arms exports to Israel during the Gaza war. This decision drew criticism from some other members of the AfD parliamentary group, suggesting a continued internal divide on the issue. Chrupalla criticised the German government's support for Israel during the Gaza war and rejected "blanket" Islamophobia.

=== COVID-19 pandemic ===
In a summer interview with ZDF in August 2020, Chrupalla did not want to clearly distance himself from Andreas Kalbitz, the now-expelled former AfD parliamentary group leader in Brandenburg. Chrupalla stated: "In the time I have known Andreas Kalbitz in this party, which is six years now, I cannot detect any extremism in him." However, he would have liked Kalbitz to distance himself more clearly from his past. Chrupalla further spoke out against mandatory mask wearing in connection with the COVID-19 pandemic and advocated voluntary wearing, as he stated that there are differing opinions about the effectiveness of masks. He described the lockdown in spring 2020 as "disproportionate."

In an ARD summer interview in August 2021, Chrupalla expressed scepticism about the effectiveness of coronavirus vaccinations, arguing that, according to Chrupalla, one is increasingly hearing about "vaccine failures" – people who contract COVID-19 despite being vaccinated – and that it is unclear how long immunity lasts or how many vaccinations are necessary.

In December 2021, Chrupalla expressed opposition to mandatory COVID-19 vaccinations during a debate on the TV discussion programme ZDF-Morgenmagazin; he argued that vaccination would make sense for the elderly and for those who had been previously ill. When the moderator, Andreas Wunn, stated that ICU doctors had confirmed that some 80 to 90 percent of COVID-19 patients in intensive care units were unvaccinated, Chrupalla claimed that such figures were unconfirmed. He instead blamed budget cuts and the downsizing of medical departments for recently overwhelmed ICUs in Germany.

=== Historical context ===
In February 2020, in the run-up to the 75th anniversary of the bombing of Dresden, Chrupalla cast doubt on the figure of around 25,000 deaths determined by a commission of historians led by Rolf-Dieter Müller between 2004 and 2010. Citing reports from relatives who were eyewitnesses in Dresden in 1945, Chrupalla assumed the number to be around 100,000, Chrupalla told Der Spiegel. Rolf-Dieter Müller and historian Sven Felix Kellerhoff criticised these statements, which contradicted the commission's scientifically sound findings. Chrupalla, they argued, was thus basing his calculations on figures derived from Joseph Goebbels' propaganda and postulated only by history falsifiers such as David Irving, the NPD, and other right-wing extremists. FDP politician Gerhart Baum, who had experienced the air raids on Dresden as a 12-year-old, vehemently contradicted Chrupalla and accused him and the AfD of abusing the victims' suffering for political purposes.

In September 2021, Chrupalla said that "German cultural heritage," including German poems and folk songs, should play a greater role in school lessons. When a ZDF children's reporter asked him what his favourite German poem was, he replied: "I'd have to think about that. I can't think of one right now." When the children's reporter asked him if he could perhaps name a favourite poet, he finally chose Heinrich Heine. The relevant excerpt from the interview was widely shared on social media. The RND described Chrupalla's behaviour as "embarrassing silence" and said that he had been exposed.

In February 2023, Chrupalla laid a wreath in front of a memorial with Russian Ambassador Sergei Yuryevich Nechayev on the anniversary of the surrender of the Wehrmacht's 6th Army in the battle of Stalingrad, and the Russian Embassy wrote in a press release that on the occasion of the "destruction of the German fascist troops," Chrupalla, together with the ambassador, had commemorated "the soldiers of the Red Army, who fell in the fight against German Nazism," Chrupalla declared that he found the Russian Embassy's statement "unfortunate" from the AfD's "perspective."
