= Dirk Spaniel =

German politician

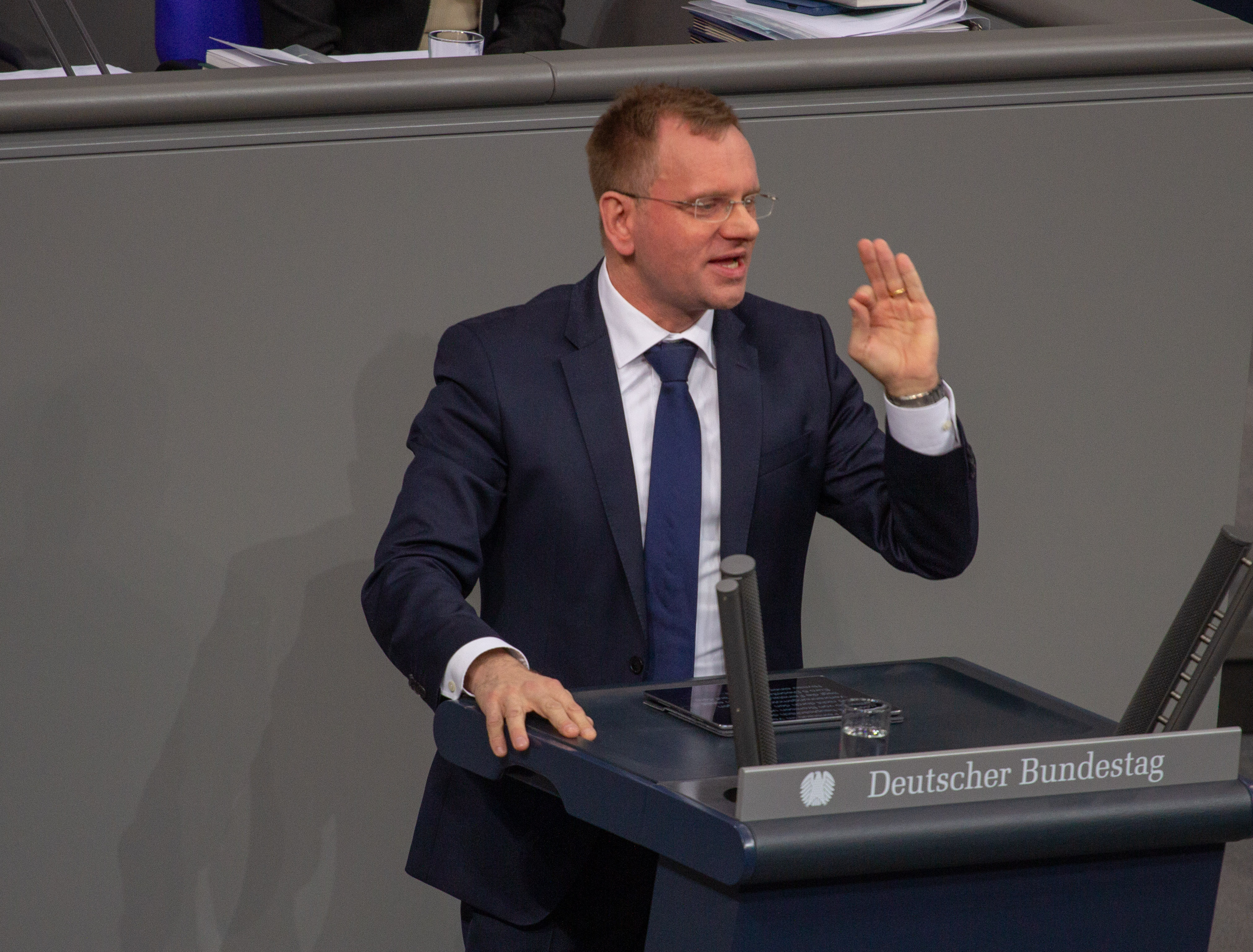
- Spaniel in 2019

Member of the Bundestag
- In office 2017–2025

Personal details
- Born: 3 November 1971 (age 54) Marburg, West Germany (now Germany)
- Party: Values Union (since 2025)
- Other political affiliations: AfD (until 2024)

Dirk Spaniel (born 3 November 1971) is a German politician (Values Union since 2025, formerly Alternative for Germany). Dirk Spaniel has served as a member of the Bundestag from the state of Baden-Württemberg from 2017 to 2025 while part of the AfD.

== Life ==
After his education that included study of Mechanical Engineering at Michigan State University, and a promotion about fuel cell electric vehicles powered by methanol, Dr. Dirk Spaniel worked as an automotive engineer in Stuttgart.

In 2015, he became member of Alternative für Deutschland in the state of Baden-Württemberg. At the first party convention that nominated the list of Bundestag candidates for the upcoming 2017 German federal election, in November 2016, the yet unknown Spaniel was unable to assert himself for nomination in the top nine of the list of Bundestag candidates, led by Alice Weidel. However, he later became a direct candidate for the constituency Stuttgart I, and in the January 2017 convention, secured place ten of the state list that eventually made eleven candidates member of the Bundestag. He became member of the Committee on Transport and Digital Infrastructure. Early in the term, Spaniel was elected leader of his state group in the parliament, but was replaced after several months. From his first Bundestag speech in 2018, he campaigned against electric cars, then mainly imports like Tesla Model S, and made a name for himself as "Doctor Diesel".

At the state party conference on February 23, 2019, he was elected speaker of the AfD Baden-Württemberg state association alongside state parliament member Bernd Gögel. He defeated Martin Hess with 371 votes to 341. Soon, he was accused of dividing the party, opposing not only Gögel but also national level leaders like Jörg Meuthen, Weidel and others, while allegedly siding with Der Flügel. In early 2020, the state association convened again, and Alice Weidel was elected as state leader for two years.

For the 2021 German federal election, with conventions limited due to C-19, the state party used a complicated online method to elected the list of candidates, which was challenged and supervised by Spaniel. He was included at no. 3, but at the end, it contained only 12 names, only one more than eventually got called up as parliament members.

Up to 2024, there was an open exchange of blows over power in the AfD state association in Baden-Württemberg between Spaniel's camp and the chairmen that succeed Weidel, Markus Frohnmaier and state parliament member Emil Sänze, both are supported by Alice Weidel. At a special party conference, member even switched off each other's microphones, and the meeting descended into chaos. Nevertheless, Spaniel was unable to prevail.

In October 2024, when state AfD prepared itself early for the 2025 German federal election that was scheduled for 28 September 2025, Alice Weidel managed to have her "favourites" elected while Spaniel and some others lost their bids and were left out from the list of candidates.

Soon after his defeat, Spaniel left the AfD, but kept his parliament seat. With that seat, he joined the CDU splinter group Values Union in January 2025.

Having left the AfD, and with the Values Union barely functional, he did not stand for re-election in the 2025 German federal election that already took place in February 2025 as a snap election.

== Positions ==
At the AfD convention in Dresden in 2021, Spaniel called for Germany to leave the European Union ("Dexit").
