= Chrupalla =

Chrupalla is the Germanized form of the Polish surname Chrupała. Notable people with the surname include:

- Pawel Chrupalla (born 2003), Norwegian footballer of Polish descent
- Tino Chrupalla (born 1975), German politician
