= Connla (disambiguation) =

Connla was the son of Cú Chulainn in Irish mythology.

Connla or Conle may also refer to:

- Connla the Ruddy, fictional son of Conn of the Hundred Battles
- Connla Cáem, historical High King of Ireland sometime during the period 463–205 BC
- Henning Conle (born 1944), German billionaire
- Connla mac Bressail Bricc, ancestor of the Ossorians in medieval Ireland
- Connla (band), folk music band from Northern Ireland
