= Hans Weidel =

German lawyer and judge (1903–1985)

- Born: 19 July 1903; Neustadt in Oberschlesien, Prussia, German Empire
- Died: 19 September 1985 (aged 82); Verl, West Germany
- Spouse: Lucie Plümpe (m. 1936)
- Relatives: Alice Weidel (granddaughter)
- Military career
- Allegiance: Nazi Germany
- Branch: Schutzstaffel
- Service years: 1933–1945
- Rank: SS-Oberscharführer
- Conflicts: World War II

Hans Weidel (19 July 1903 – 19 September 1985) was a German lawyer, Nazi activist, and military judge.

== Early life ==
Weidel was born in Neustadt, Upper Silesia (now Prudnik, Poland). He studied law in Munich and Breslau. He joined the Nazi Party in 1932, and in July of that same year he became a judicial assessor in Leobschütz. Later, he started working as a lawyer. He joined the SS in January 1933. He gained the rank of an Oberscharführer in Oppeln. He was also a member of Luftschutzbund, Bund Deutscher Osten, Reichskolonialbund, NS-Reichskriegerbund, and NS-Volkswohlfahrt.

== Career ==
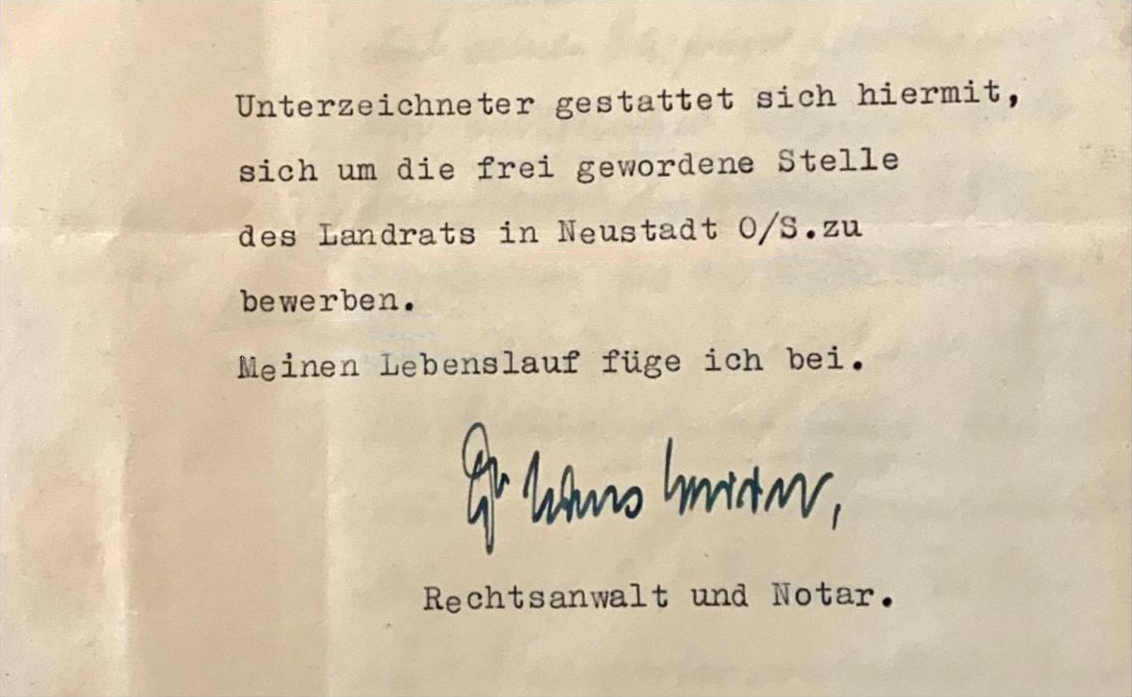
Weidel's application for the position of Landrat in Neustadt (Prudnik)

As a "loyal supporter of the [Nazi] movement", Weidel ran for the position of Landrat in Neustadt (then Landkreis Neustadt O.S., present-day Prudnik County) in February 1937. He opened his law office by the Prudnik Town Hall. He bought shares in a local brewery and a disused cement plant, where he arranged apartments and rented warehouses.

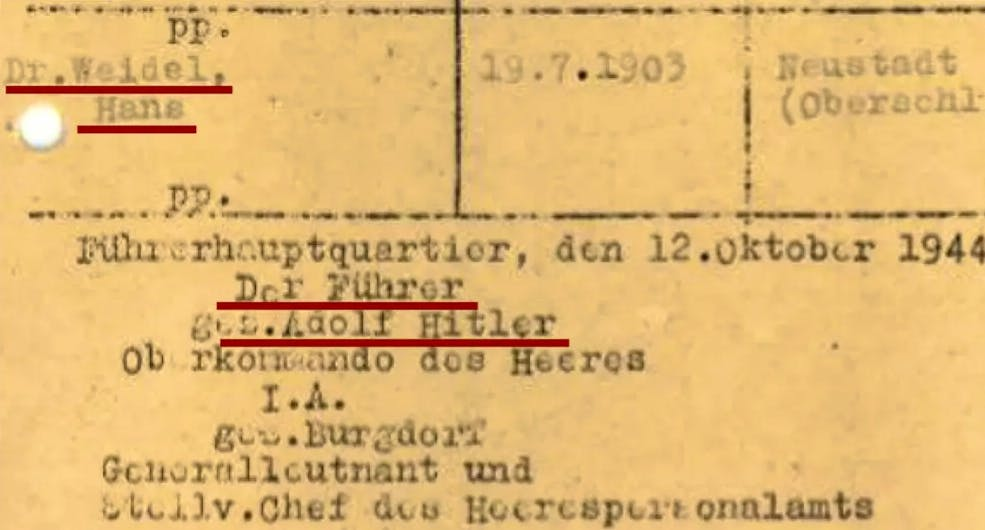
Weidel's appointment as a Chief Staff Judge

From 1939 to 1941, Weidel was Kreisgruppenführer (district group leader) of the National Socialist Association of Legal Professionals in the district of Leobschütz. He joined the German army at the start of World War II. In March 1941, he took training as a military judge in German-occupied Warsaw. He became a military judge at the Warsaw commandant's office in July 1941. On 12 October 1944, Adolf Hitler appointed him a Chief Staff Judge. He was responsible for sentencing opponents of the Third Reich.

In May 1945, Weidel settled in Gütersloh, Westphalia with his family. In November 1948, the Bielefeld tribunal opened a case against Weidel for "membership of a criminal organization". He defended himself by claiming he was insignificantly involved in Nazi politics, and that he joined the Nazi Party and SS in spring 1933. In actuality, he joined those organisations before Hitler's rise to power. During the Nazi era, he declared loyalty to the Nazi Party, saying: "Even before the September 1930 election, I voted National Socialist and actively campaigned in the movement’s election propaganda." During a 1948 hearing, Weidel claimed to have no knowledge of Nazi's treatment of Jews and of the SS's crimes. Prosecutors closed the case against Weidel, citing a lack of evidence.

Weidel opened a law office in Gütersloh. He became a leader of the local Federation of Expellees and sought compensation for his abandoned property in Upper Silesia. In the 1970s, police in North Rhine-Westphalia and Hamburg reopened investigations into Weidel, but did not prosecute him.

== Personal life ==
Weidel married Lucie Plümpe, teacher of the girls' class at the agricultural school in Neustadt, in October 1936. She was also a member of the Nazi Party. His granddaughter, Alice Weidel, is a co-chairwoman of the right wing Alternative for Germany party.
