= Stephan Brandner =

German politician (born 1966)

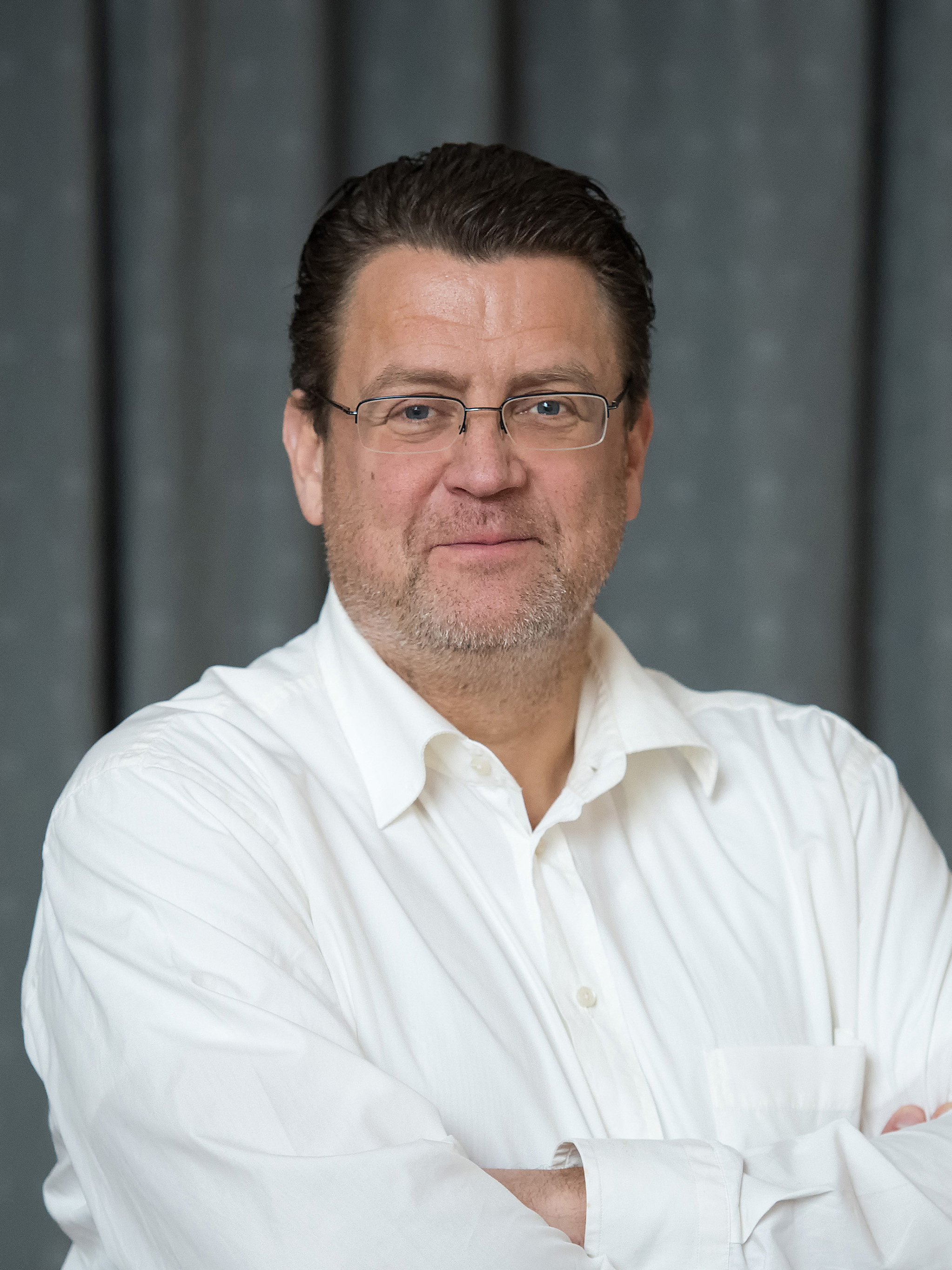
- Brandner in 2017

Deputy Leader of the Alternative for Germany
- Incumbent
- Assumed office 30 November 2019 Serving with Mariana Harder-Kühnel; Beatrix von Storch; Peter Boehringer
- Leader: Alice Weidel; Tino Chrupalla
- Preceded by: Albrecht Glaser

Chair of the Legal Affairs and Consumer Protection Committee
- In office 31 January 2018 – 13 November 2019
- Preceded by: Siegfried Kauder
- Succeeded by: Heribert Hirte

Member of the Bundestag for Thuringia
- Incumbent
- Assumed office 24 September 2017
- Constituency: Alternative for Germany List

Member of the Landtag of Thuringia
- In office 14 September 2014 – 24 September 2017
- Constituency: Alternative for Germany List

Personal details
- Born: 29 May 1966 (age 60) Herten, West Germany
- Party: Alternative for Germany (since 2013)

Stephan Brandner (born 29 May 1966 in Herten) is a German politician. A member of the Bundestag for the far-right Alternative for Germany (AfD) since 2017, he served as chairman of the Bundestag's Legal Affairs Committee from 31 January 2018 to November 2019. He was the front runner candidate of the AfD in the state of Thuringia for the 2017 German federal election. Since November 2019, Brandner has been one of three chairman deputies of the AfD.

== Biography ==
Brandner was born on 29 May 1966 in Herten. He became an industrial management assistant (Industriekaufmann) and then studied law at Universität Regensburg. Since 1997 he has been working as a lawyer, previously in Munich, then in Gera.

He is member of KStV Agilolfia Regensburg in Kartellverband katholischer deutscher Studentenvereine.

== Controversies ==
After the Halle synagogue shooting, Brandner shared a message on Twitter, criticising that politicians were "lingering" with candles in front of synagogues and mosques, whereas the two casualties were neither Jews nor Muslims, but "organic Germans". Social Democratic politicians and associations of German lawyers called on Brandner to resign from his office as chairman of the Bundestag's Legal Affairs Committee. Brandner is close to the positions of the ultra-nationalist wing (Der Flügel) within the AfD.
