= Emil Sänze =

German politician (born 1980)

Member of the Landtag of Baden-Württemberg
- Incumbent
- Assumed office May 2016

Personal details
- Born: 27 September 1950 (age 75) Beuren, Esslingen, Germany
- Party: Alternative for Germany

Emil Sänze (born 27 September 1950 in Beuren) is a German politician from the Alternative for Germany (AfD). Since May 2016, he has been a member of the Landtag of Baden-Württemberg and since July 2022, co-chairman of the AfD Baden-Württemberg.

== Professional career ==
Sänze completed an apprenticeship as an industrial and commercial clerk and subsequently studied business administration in Konstanz. He worked, among other things, as a sales manager and authorized signatory for Deutsche Bank and in the fleet leasing department for BMW Bank GmbH. Until 2014, Emil Sänze worked as a business economist at BMW Bank. Sänze is currently working as an independent management consultant in Sulz am Neckar.

He rejected the accusation by the Neue Rottweiler Zeitung that he had made false statements in the state parliament handbook regarding his activities as managing director or managing partner and purchased agreement for shares in the holding company, which designated him as managing director. While this agreement was confirmed by CarVita Holding, the company stated that the purchase agreement stipulated a payment from Sänze, which he failed to make for unknown reasons, thus rendering the agreement invalid. Sänze therefore did not become managing director of the holding company. Sänze complained of a loss of customers and "qualified leads" that he attributed to the publication and reporting about his relationship with the AfD.

== Political career ==
Sänze is a member of the AfD. He was elected to the Landtag of Baden-Württemberg in the 2016 Baden-Württemberg state election with 16.4 percent of the vote in the Rottweil constituency. In the newly formed AfD parliamentary group, Sänze was elected deputy chairman. He resigned from this position on 9 January 2019.

When Jörg Meuthen and 12 other members of parliament left the AfD parliamentary group in July 2016 following the dispute surrounding Wolfgang Gedeon, Sänze did not follow suit and remained in the group, where he was re-elected deputy chairman on 7 July 2016. Sänze defended Gedeon against the accusation of antisemitism, which was also voiced by the AfD federal executive committee. He stated that Gedeon's assertion that Jews were the "internal enemy of the Christian West" was a "thesis," not Gedeon's "direct opinion" or his "personal opinion." Sänze claimed he had "never heard anything antisemitic from Mr. Gedeon".

Emil Sänze distanced himself from the Pegida movement in January 2015, which is also active in small offshoots in southwestern Germany. He said there were people in the movement whom he did not want to follow, and he also disliked their language.

In December 2016, the Frankfurter Allgemeine Zeitung reported that it had obtained a paper by Sänze entitled "Fit for Return". In this paper, Sänze proposes housing asylum seekers in special camps in " ethnically homogeneous" groups, restricting their fundamental rights, in particular, the right to free development (Article 2 of the Basic Law), equal treatment (Article 3 of the Basic Law), and freedom of movement ( Article 11 of the Basic Law). The aim is to prevent integration and instead prepare asylum seekers for their return. In May 2017, Sänze presented his paper to the public for the first time at an event of the AfD parliamentary group in Sigmaringen. Claudia Martin, a legislator who left the AfD in 2016 citing its rightward shift, compared the plan's proposals to the Nazi Madagascar Plan.

In early December 2017, at the AfD federal party conference, he supported a motion by Wolfgang Gedeon, a member of the Landtag of Baden-Württemberg criticized for his antisemitic and anti-Zionist positions, arguing that the term "secondary antisemitism" was an "ideological battle cry" and should therefore be rejected, as it serves to "defame political opponents and intimidate the public. In a resolution, Sänze, along with Gedeon and other AfD state parliamentarians, also advocated that the AfD should consider supporting the Boycott, Divestment and Sanctions campaign.

Following what was described as Sänze's "blatant racist attacks" on Muhterem Aras, President of the Landtag of Baden-Württemberg, the Mannheimer Morgen wrote of a "new low".

In a written statement, Sänze denied Aras the right to speak about the persecution of Jews during the Nazi era because of her Turkish origin. Speaking to the FAZ, Sänze stated that not Aras—who holds only German citizenship —but "we Germans" were responsible for feelings in the culture of remembrance. Aras, however, used "the 'we' as if she were fully integrated here, but she will never be fully integrated because of her origin." Had someone who, in his view, was "German" and not Muhterem Aras, he stated that he would have had no objections to the content of the press release.

The historian Stefanie Schüler-Springorum called Sänze's statements "shaped by a nationalist understanding of the state that simply has no place in a democracy." For the historian Miriam Gebhardt, Sänze's interpretation of the term "national people" contradicts the Basic Law. For the antisemitism commissioner Felix Klein, Sänze's statements were "downright absurd" and bordering on racism.

On the AfD parliamentary group's website, Sänze subsequently explained that Aras's ancestors had contributed nothing to the country's history—Sänze's examples go back to the Battle of Lechfeld in 955—nor had they made any "sacrifices." Therefore, she argued, there was "no need for any instruction" from her about the Holocaust, which, according to Sänze, she "selects here [...] like a useful cherry for her migration society narrative and for her delegitimization of the established German nation." The Germanist and literary scholar Heinrich Detering wrote that what Sänze demands "as a prerequisite not only for assuming political office or participating in social debates, but indeed as a prerequisite for belonging to 'Germany'" "is disturbingly similar to proof of Aryan ancestry".

Emil Sänze belongs to the AfD's internal group "Stuttgart Appeal," whose initial signatories are mostly from the national-conservative to far-right wing of the party. AfD state parliament member Christina Baum is also a member of the group.

According to a report by Südwestrundfunk (SWR), Emil Sänze and Rainer Podeswa resigned from their positions as deputy parliamentary group leaders in January 2019. According to SWR, the reason for their resignation was the dispute over the party expulsion proceedings against Stefan Räpple and Wolfgang Gedeon, who were excluded from individual state parliament sessions. Before the AfD state party conference in February 2019, Sänze and Christina Baum announced their intention to run for the state executive committee. Their competitors were AfD parliamentary group leader Bernd Gögel and Bundestag member Martin Hess. Sänze stated that the AfD should not pursue a course of accommodation and must maintain its core identity; he disagreed with the state association's current course.

In May 2020, on the anniversary of Germany's liberation from the Nazi regime, Sänze wrote on Facebook that today they want to tell us "that the Germans had to be liberated from themselves and therefore didn't appreciate it at the time. But when such a liberation narrative is brutally forced down a people's throats in – then as now! – repulsive German propaganda style, then something is fundamentally wrong".

In the 2021 Baden-Württemberg state election, he was again elected to the state parliament via a second mandate in the Rottweil constituency. Emil Sänze was a member of the 17th Federal Convention for the election of the Federal President in February 2022.

In a 2021 report by the Federal Office for the Protection of the Constitution (BfV), Sänze was accused of suggesting "the necessity of violent resistance" and speaking of a "Merkel regime." The BfV based its assessment on a Facebook post by Sänze on COVID-19 policy from January 2021.

In July 2022, he was elected state chairman of the AfD Baden-Württemberg.

In October 2022, Sänze wrote on Facebook about the city of Cologne's decision to allow a muezzin to call to prayer from a local mosque, stating that "Europeans prevented the Islamization of Europe before Vienna, and now we are being Islamized through immigration without resistance." In November 2022, Sänze wrote that the Federal Ministry of the Interior's proposal to facilitate the naturalization of foreigners would lead to an "empty Germany without German substance".

In January 2023, he lost his candidacy for the chairmanship of the parliamentary group to Anton Baron.

Sänze will head the AfD state list in the 2026 Baden-Württemberg state election.

At the AfD's election campaign kickoff in Karlsruhe in 2026, he insulted Markus Söder with the following words: "I mean, Söder is not only physically disabled, but sometimes also mentally disabled, ladies and gentlemen. But we let him live – he is always funny from time to time".
