= Leader of the Opposition (Germany) =

Politician who leads the German official opposition

- Oppositionsführer
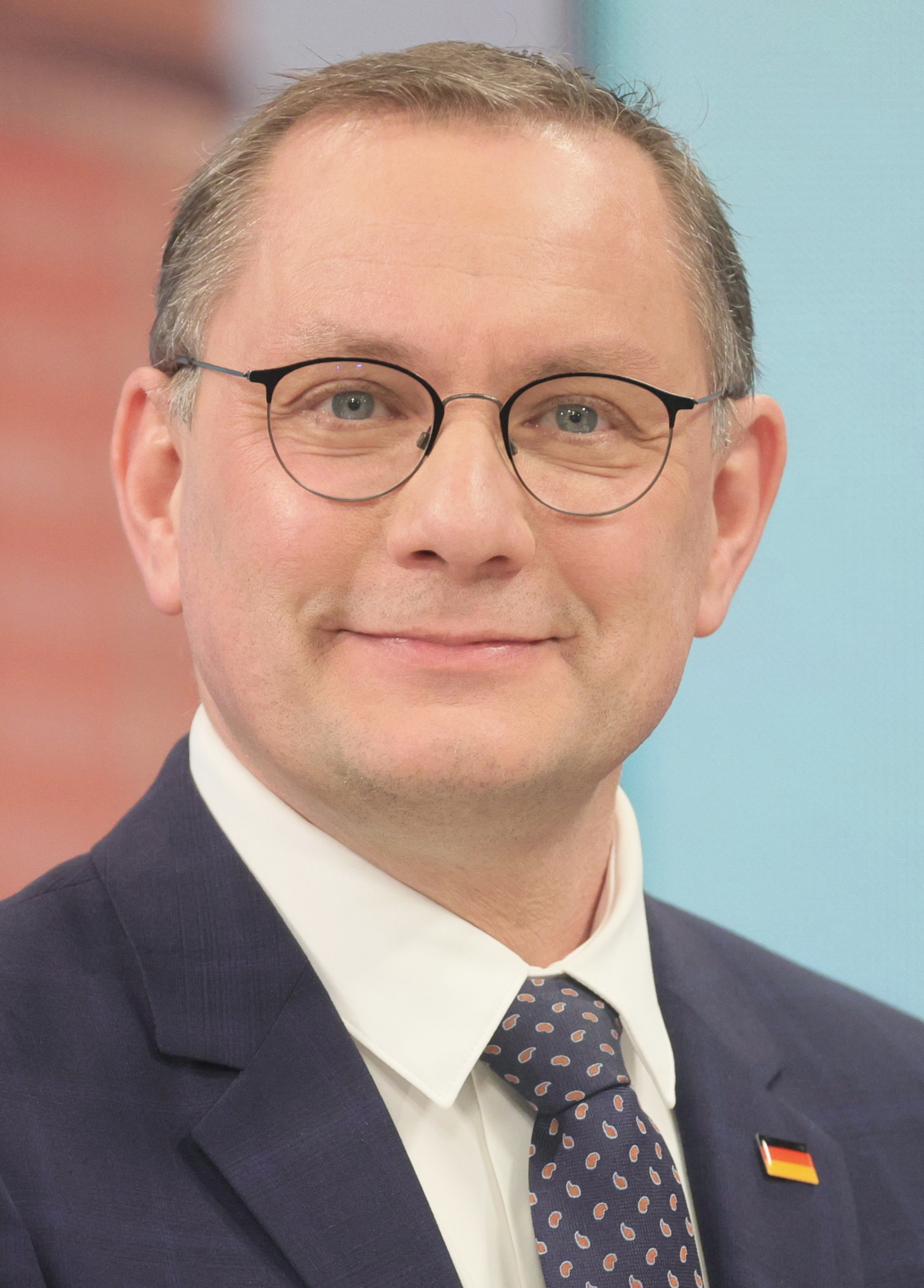
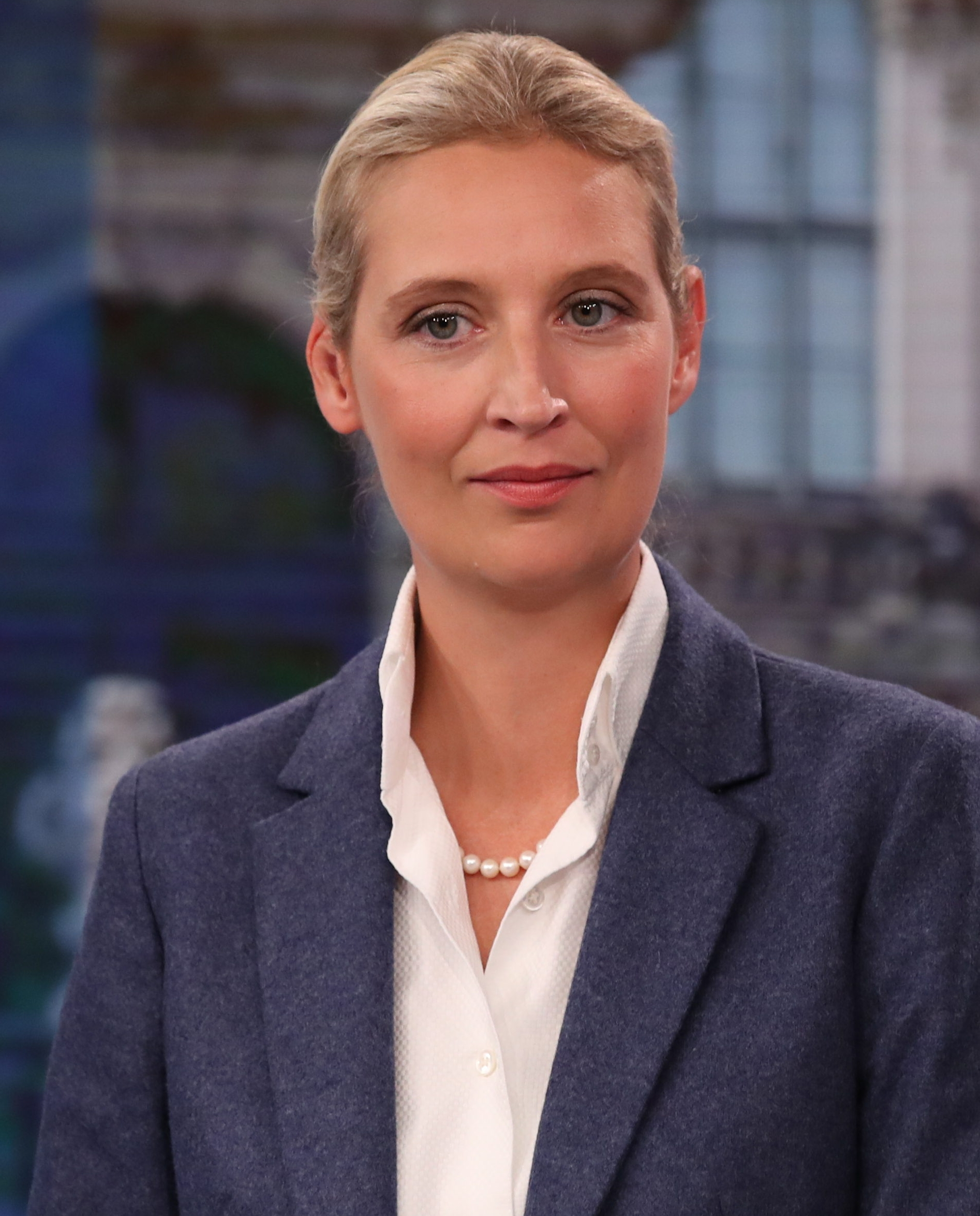
- Incumbent; Tino Chrupalla; Alice Weidel since 6 May 2025
- Bundestag
- Member of: Bundestag
- Term length: While parliamentary leader of the largest party not in government
- Inaugural holder: Kurt Schumacher
- Formation: 7 September 1949
- Salary: €127,100.40 (2023)

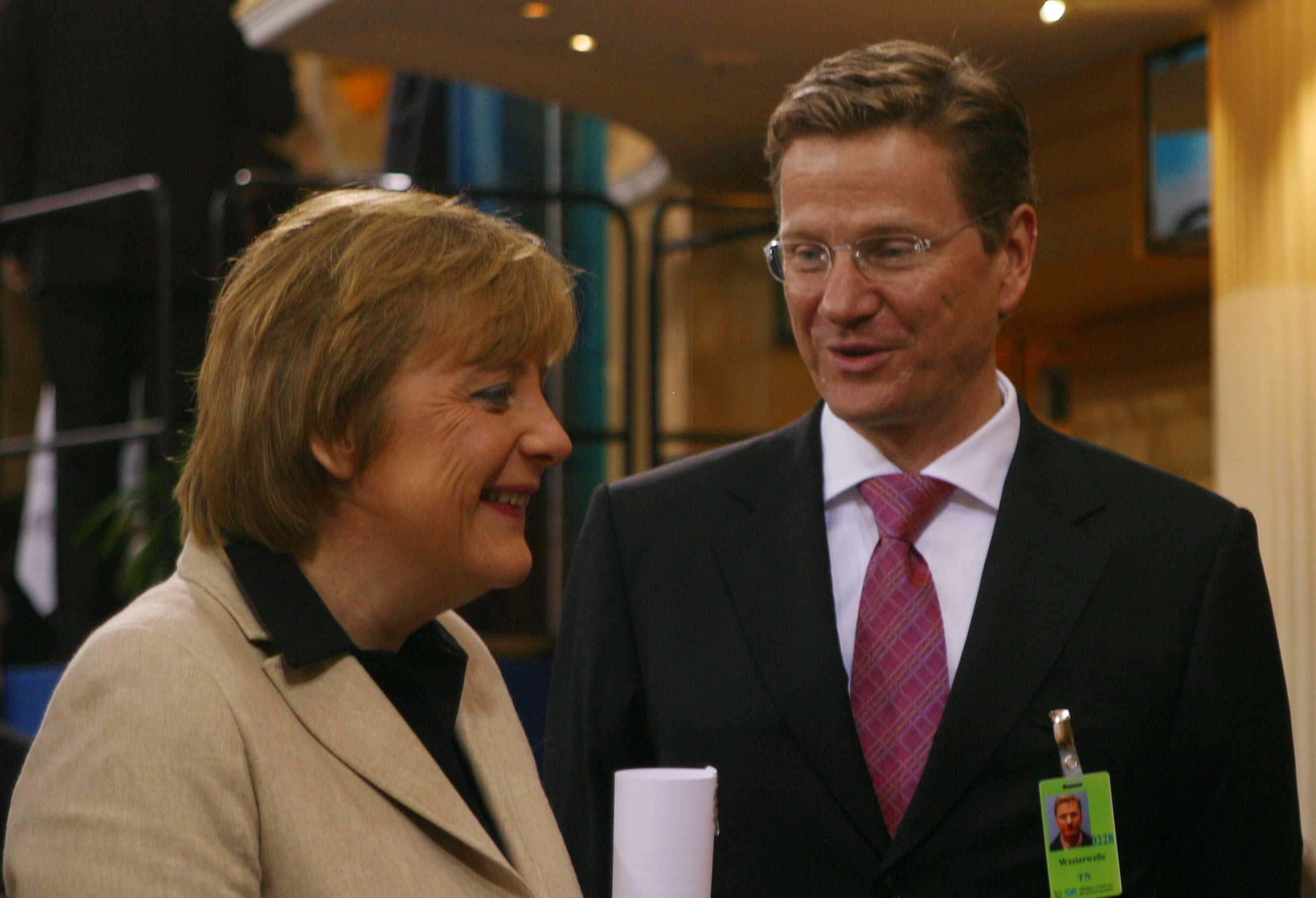
Then-Leader of the Opposition Angela Merkel with future Leader of the Opposition Guido Westerwelle at the Munich Security Conference in early 2005

The Leader of the Opposition (German: Oppositionsführer, pronounced [ɔpoziˈt͡si̯oːnsˌfyːʁɐ]) in Germany is the parliamentary leader of the largest political party in the Bundestag that is not in government.

In Germany, the leader of the Opposition is an informal title that is not even mentioned and does not have any formal functions in the by-laws of the Bundestag. However, the leader of the Opposition is, by convention, the first person to respond to the most senior government spokesperson during a debate. The title also exists on a state level, but only in the Landtag of Schleswig-Holstein is the position formally recognized as an actual office.

Only three leaders of the Opposition went on to be directly elected Chancellor afterwards: Helmut Kohl (1976–1982), Angela Merkel (2002–2005) and Friedrich Merz (2022–2025).

== List of opposition leaders in Germany since 1949 (Federal Republic of Germany) ==
| No. | Image | Name (Birth–Death) | Party | Term of office | | | Chancellor |
| No. | Image | Name (Birth–Death) | Party | Took office | Left office | Term length | Chancellor |
|---|---|---|---|---|---|---|---|
| 1 | | Kurt Schumacher (1895–1952) | Social Democratic Party (SPD) | 7 September 1949 | 20 August 1952 | 2 years, 348 days | Konrad Adenauer |
| 2 | | Erich Ollenhauer (1901–1963) | Social Democratic Party (SPD) | 27 September 1952 | 14 December 1963 | 11 years, 78 days | Konrad Adenauer; Ludwig Erhard |
| 3 | | Fritz Erler (1913–1967) | Social Democratic Party (SPD) | 3 March 1964 | 1 December 1966 | 2 years, 273 days | Ludwig Erhard |
| 4 | | Knut Freiherr von Kühlmann-Stumm (1916–1977) | Free Democratic Party (FDP) | 1 December 1966 | 23 January 1968 | 1 year, 53 days | Kurt Georg Kiesinger |
| 5 | | Wolfgang Mischnick (1921–2002) | Free Democratic Party (FDP) | 23 January 1968 | 22 October 1969 | 1 year, 272 days | Kurt Georg Kiesinger |
| 6 | | Rainer Barzel (1924–2006) | Christian Democratic Union (CDU) | 22 October 1969 | 17 May 1973 | 3 years, 207 days | Willy Brandt |
| 7 | | Karl Carstens (1914–1992) | Christian Democratic Union (CDU) | 17 May 1973 | 13 September 1976 | 3 years, 119 days | Willy Brandt; Helmut Schmidt |
| 8 | | Helmut Kohl (1930–2017) | Christian Democratic Union (CDU) | 13 September 1976 | 1 October 1982 | 6 years, 18 days | Helmut Schmidt |
| 9 | | Herbert Wehner (1906–1990) | Social Democratic Party (SPD) | 1 October 1982 | 8 March 1983 | 1 year, 158 days | Helmut Kohl |
| 10 | | Hans-Jochen Vogel (1926–2020) | Social Democratic Party (SPD) | 8 March 1983 | 12 November 1991 | 8 years, 249 days | Helmut Kohl |
| 11 | | Hans-Ulrich Klose (1937–2023) | Social Democratic Party (SPD) | 12 November 1991 | 10 November 1994 | 2 years, 363 days | Helmut Kohl |
| 12 | | Rudolf Scharping (born 1947) | Social Democratic Party (SPD) | 10 November 1994 | 27 October 1998 | 3 years, 351 days | Helmut Kohl |
| 13 | | Wolfgang Schäuble (1942–2023) | Christian Democratic Union (CDU) | 27 October 1998 | 29 February 2000 | 1 year, 125 days | Gerhard Schröder |
| 14 | | Friedrich Merz (born 1955) | Christian Democratic Union (CDU) | 29 February 2000 | 22 September 2002 | 2 years, 206 days | Gerhard Schröder |
| 15 | | Angela Merkel (born 1954) | Christian Democratic Union (CDU) | 22 September 2002 | 22 November 2005 | 3 years, 61 days | Gerhard Schröder |
| 16 | | Wolfgang Gerhardt (1943–2024) | Free Democratic Party (FDP) | 22 November 2005 | 1 May 2006 | 160 days | Angela Merkel |
| 17 | | Guido Westerwelle (1961–2016) | Free Democratic Party (FDP) | 1 May 2006 | 28 October 2009 | 3 years, 180 days | Angela Merkel |
| 18 | | Frank-Walter Steinmeier (born 1956) | Social Democratic Party (SPD) | 28 October 2009 | 16 December 2013 (Note: When Frank-Walter Steinmeier donated one of his kidneys to his end-stage kidney disease-stricken wife, from 23 August to 26 October 2010 senior SPD Bundestag member Joachim Poß served as interim Bundestag leader in his absence.) | 4 years, 49 days | Angela Merkel |
| 20 | | Gregor Gysi (born 1948) | The Left | 17 December 2013 | 12 October 2015 | 1 year, 299 days | Angela Merkel |
| 21 | | Dietmar Bartsch (born 1958); Sahra Wagenknecht (born 1969) | The Left | 12 October 2015 | 24 October 2017 | 2 years, 12 days | Angela Merkel |
| 22 | | Alexander Gauland (born 1941); Alice Weidel (born 1979) | Alternative for Germany (AfD) | 24 October 2017 | 26 October 2021 (Note: After the first Bundestag session following the 2021 federal election, the unofficial position of Leader of the Opposition was for the moment effectively vacant: the government-forming negotiations that eventually led to a coalition of the SPD, the Greens and the FDP were still underway, so the Merkel IV cabinet remained in office as a caretaker government, but the AfD was no longer the strongest non-government party, as the Greens held more seats in the Bundestag. Technically, then, the role of opposition leader would have fallen to the group leadership of the Greens, but as a party that would foreseeably soon enter government, they did not appear that way, and were not perceived that way in the media. There was no opposition leader again until 8 December with the election of Olaf Scholz as chancellor, which meant that Ralf Brinkaus, as leader of the largest opposition group, fell into this role.) | 4 years, 2 days | Angela Merkel |
| 23 | | Ralph Brinkhaus (born 1968) | Christian Democratic Union (CDU) | 8 December 2021 | 15 February 2022 | 69 days | Olaf Scholz |
| (14) | | Friedrich Merz (born 1955) | Christian Democratic Union (CDU) | 15 February 2022 | 6 May 2025 | 3 years, 80 days | Olaf Scholz |
| 24 (-/22) | | Tino Chrupalla (born 1975); Alice Weidel (born 1979) | Alternative for Germany (AfD) | 6 May 2025 | | 1 year, 124 days | Friedrich Merz |
