= Alternative for Germany donation scandal =

Political scandal in Germany

The Alternative for Germany donation scandal (German: AfD-Spendenaffäre) was a political scandal that broke in 2018 in which the Alternative for Germany party (AfD) was found to have accepted financial contributions in contravention of conditions within German laws regulating donations to political parties. In October 2026, a data leak containing internal AfD communications revealed, that Alice Weidel may have been involved in illegal party donations earlier and more extensively than she had previously admitted.

== Illegal Party donations from Switzerland ==
In the three months leading up to the 2017 general election the AfD regional office for the Lake Constance area received 18 weekly payments totalling 132000 euros documented as "campaign donations for Alice Weidel". Alice Weidel is deputy chairman of the regional party organisation and co-chair of the AfD parliamentary group in the Bundestag. At the beginning of 2018 they received a further 150,000 euros. These were not declared as required by law and apparently disguised as to their true source and aggregate amount. Further irregular contributions to AfD party politicians were identified, including to Jörg Meuthen, Guido Reil and Marcus Petzell.

According to media reports, the payments came from billionaire property tycoon Henning Conle though several intermediaries and split into smaller amounts. The AfD has been ordered to pay over 500000 euros to the federal government, including the illegal sums and penalties.

== AfD -Leaks 2026 ==
In October 2026, a data leak containing internal AfD communications surfaced online. It revealed that Alice Weidel may have been involved in illegal party donations earlier and more extensively than she had previously admitted.

Alice Weidel had claimed that she only learned of the donations weeks after they had been received, asserting that she had been taken by surprise by them. The emails, however, stand in stark contradiction to her account at the time, suggesting that she may have been more deeply involved in the acceptance of the funds—which were later classified as illegal—than she has publicly acknowledged.

The AfD leak includes an email from July 2017, sent from Weidel’s account, which states: "I have been notified of donations that are to be used to fund my social media election campaign." This message was addressed to two associates within her local party branch. It further instructs a party colleague of hers in the Lake Constance region to "check the account perhaps twice a week for any incoming donations."

In another email from July 2017, Weidel mentions that a social media manager would "use the donations intended for me received in our local branch account, exclusively for Facebook during the election campaign." Weidel requested that her two associates set up a dedicated campaign account for these funds, to which she would have personal access. Exactly four days after these donations were mentioned in the email, a series of transfers began, arriving in 18 separate tranches from Switzerland, all bearing the explicit payment reference: "Election campaign donation Alice Weidel social media."
