= Bernd Baumann =

German politician

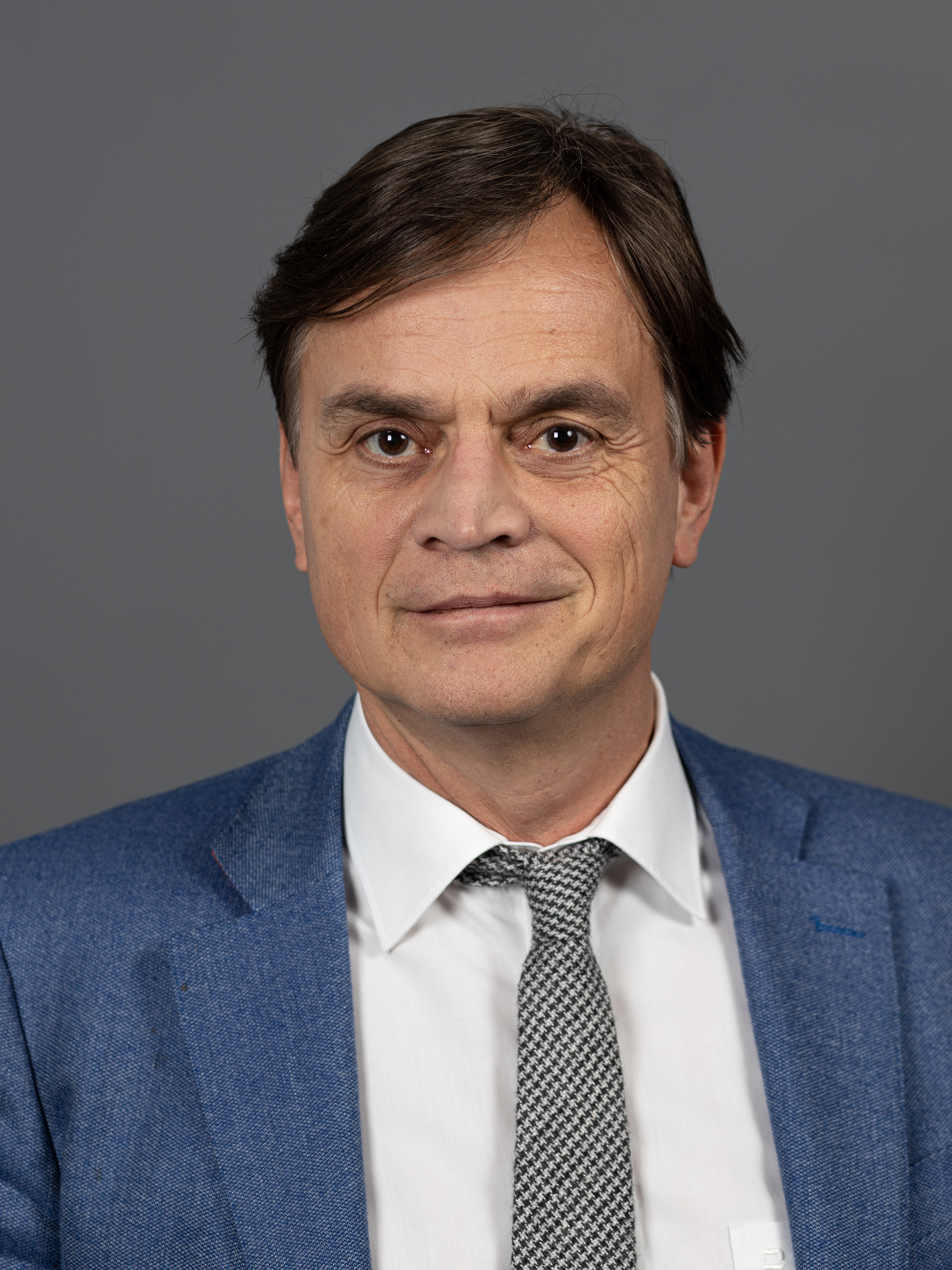
- Baumann in 2020

Chief Whip of the Alternative for Germany in the Bundestag
- Incumbent
- Assumed office 3 October 2017
- Leader: Alexander Gauland; Alice Weidel; Tino Chrupalla
- Preceded by: Office established

Member of the Bundestag for Hamburg
- Incumbent
- Assumed office 24 October 2017
- Constituency: AfD List

Personal details
- Born: 31 January 1958 (age 68) Wanne-Eickel, West Germany
- Party: Alternative for Germany
- Education: Ruhr University Bochum

Bernd Baumann (German pronunciation: [ˈbɛɐ̯nt ˈbaʊman]; born 31 January 1958) is a German politician of the far-right party, Alternative for Germany (AfD) and chief whip of the AfD Group who has been serving as a member of the Bundestag from the state of Hamburg since 2017.

== Life and politics ==
Baumann was born 1958 in the West German city Herne and studied economics at the Ruhr University Bochum and achieved his PhD in 1991.

In 2013, Baumann joined the newly founded AfD Hamburg and was elected as chairman of its Altona district branch. He was the party's campaign manager for the 2014 European elections. From October 2015 to November 2017, he was the state chairman (Landessprecher) of the party in the city state of Hamburg.

In 2017 Baumann became the first chief whip (Erster Parlamentarischer Geschäftsführer) of the AfD in the Bundestag.

== Positions ==
Bernd Baumann states there is an “opprobrious campaign” against his party by the largely tax-funded nonprofit journalism organisation “Correctiv” against a private function of right-wing politicians and business people in November 2023 in which AfD and CDU politicians as well as Martin Sellner (BI) took part. Baumann blamed a “left-green class” of politicians and “large parts of the media” in the ARD magazin Report from Berlin.
