= Henning Conle =

UK-based German-Swiss billionaire property owner

- Born: February 1944 (age 82)
- Known for: Property owner

Henning Conle (born February 1944) is a UK-based German-Swiss billionaire property owner.

Through a Liechtenstein-registered company, Sirosa, Conle owns "almost £2bn of prime real estate" in central London, including the Liberty of London building, the Kensington Roof Gardens, the London offices of Manchester United and the art deco Shell Mex House on the Strand.

In Germany, Conle may own "more than 10,000 properties", and in Hamburg, owned up to 2,500 flats in the 1990s. Conle is "long-renowned in his home country of Germany for shoddy buildings and acrimonious tenant disputes".

In 2013, Conle purchased the Kensington Roof Gardens through a company, Cartina Kensington Ltd, registered in the British Virgin Islands and owned by Sirosa Anstalt. The property was purchased for £225 million, £25 million higher than the closest bidder – the Qatar Investment Authority.

There has been speculation that Conle acts on behalf of Russian investors, though representatives for Sirosa have denied this.

In 2018, media investigations showed that Conle was involved in the AfD donation scandal by illegal financing politicians of Germany's right-wing party "Alternative for Germany", especially Alice Weidel.

Other companies owned by Conle include the British-registered Strandbrook, of which Conle was a registered officer until March 2025 and his daughter Johanna Conle is still an active officer.

According to The Sunday Times Rich List in 2020 his net worth was estimated at £1.168 billion.

== Financing of AfD ==
Conle is a supporter of the far-right political party Alternative for Germany. Conle donated a total of Euro 132,000 by means of straw men for the federal election campaign of the AfD parliamentary group leader Alice Weidel. Conle disguised his donation from Switzerland and is also involved in the AfD donation scandal.

Frauke Petry, former AfD party leader, reported in an interview that Conle had already offered donations to the AfD in 2015, but wanted to stay in the background. Anonymous donations to political parties are illegal in Germany. Petry met Conle several times between October 2015 and May 2016 in Leipzig and Zurich. At a meeting in Switzerland, Jörg Meuthen, the AfD Co-party leader, is said to have been also there. This claim is denied by Meuthen. The Bundestag administration has also declared a donation to him to be illegal.
