= Jörg Meuthen =

German economist and politician (born 1961)

Professor Jörg Meuthen
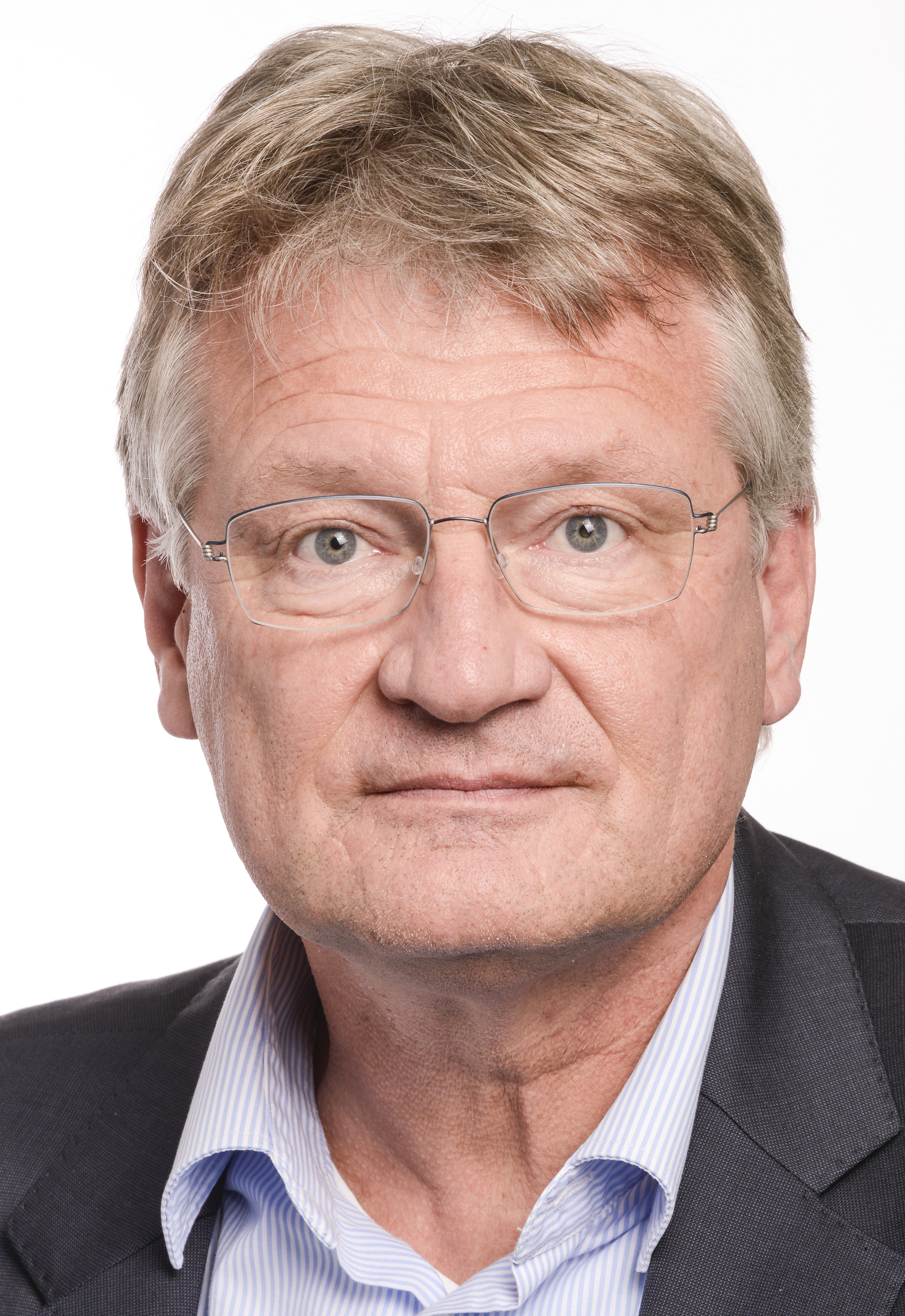
- Meuthen in 2019

Leader of the Alternative for Germany
- In office 5 July 2015 – 28 January 2022 Serving with Tino Chrupalla
- Preceded by: Bernd Lucke
- Succeeded by: Alice Weidel

Leader of the Alternative for Germany in the Landtag of Baden-Württemberg
- In office 11 October 2016 – 8 November 2017
- Chief Whip: Anton Baron
- Preceded by: Heiner Merz
- Succeeded by: Bernd Gögel
- In office 16 March 2016 – 6 July 2016
- Chief Whip: Bernd Grimmer
- Preceded by: Position established
- Succeeded by: Heiner Merz

Member of the European Parliament for Germany
- In office 8 November 2017 – 17 July 2024
- Preceded by: Beatrix von Storch

Member of the Landtag of Baden-Württemberg for Backnang
- In office 11 May 2016 – 31 December 2017
- Preceded by: multi-member district
- Succeeded by: Markus Widenmeyer (2018)
- Constituency: Alternative for Germany list

Personal details
- Born: Jörg Hubert Meuthen; 29 June 1961 (age 65) Essen, West Germany (now Germany)
- Party: Values Union (since 2024)
- Other political affiliations: Christian Democratic Union (1977); Alternative for Germany (2013–2022); Zentrum (2022–2023)
- Spouse: Natalia Zvekic (m. 2018)
- Children: 5
- Education: University of Münster (no degree); University of Mainz; University of Cologne (Dr. rer. pol.)
- Occupation: Economist; Politician; Public Servant; Professor
- Website: Official website

Jörg Hubert Meuthen (German: [ˈjœɐ̯k ˈmɔʏtn̩]; born 29 June 1961) is a German economist, academic and politician who was a Member of the European Parliament (MEP) for Germany from 2017 until 2024.

He was the frontrunner for the Alternative for Germany (AfD) party at the 2016 Baden-Württemberg state election and was a Member of Parliament and parliamentary leader from March 2016. He was the leading candidate of the AfD for the 2019 European Parliament election. He served as federal spokesman for, and thus leader of, the AfD from July 2015 until his resignation in January 2022, caused by conflict with right-wing extremist elements in the party. From June 2022 to September 2023, he sat as a member of the German Centre Party. He sat as an independent MEP for the remainder of his term. Since September 2024, he has been part of the Values Union party.

== Life ==
Meuthen is a professor of political economy and finance at the Academy of Kehl. Initially close to the Free Democratic Party of Germany (FDP), he joined the AfD because of its eurosceptic positions. He strongly defends economic liberalism. He is married to the Russian-born Natalia Zvekic, whose ex-husband came from Yugoslavia.

He was leader of the AfD in the 2016 regional elections in Baden-Württemberg, and has been a member of parliament and parliamentary leader since March 2016. In November 2017, he joined the European Parliament following the resignation of Beatrix von Storch. Re-elected MEP in May 2019, he is a member of the parliamentary group Identity and Democracy (ID). While positioning the AfD as a "bürgerlich" (center-right conservative) party, he was strongly challenged in 2020 by 'The Wing' (Der Flügel), a far-right faction within the party. Meuthen tried to exclude one of its leaders (Björn Höcke) because of his neo-Nazi ties, but ultimately failed. This deepened divisions within the party. Critics accused Meuthen of trying to reshape the AfD's image and secure his position as the top candidate for the Bundestag elections. At the November 2020 party congress, he was met with boos from internal opponents, and a motion to condemn him received 47 percent of the vote.

In September 2019, the regional film fund HessenFilm fired its CEO Hans Joachim Mendig over a controversial meeting with Jörg Meuthen.

Meuthen announced in October 2021 that he would not be running in the next leadership election. In January 2022, he announced that he would step down from his official positions and leave the AfD, because the party had moved too far to the right.

== Political views ==
Meuthen was initially considered part of the Bernd Lucke-related, more economically liberal and moderate wing of the AfD near the start of the party's founding. He has described himself as an economic liberal but "pretty conservative" on other issues. Following the election of Frauke Petry as AfD chairwoman, Meuthen was seen to ally himself with the party's more right-wing faction. In 2016, he expressed support for what he termed a "conservative reformation" in Germany and argued against what he regards as lingering influence of the West German student movement on German politics. He has expressed opposition to extremist elements within the AfD. He also adopts national-conservative positions. Some press outlets consider his rhetoric as xenophobic against migrants and Muslims. The Financial Times described Meuthen as a "populist" but promoting a relatively more moderate and "quasi-acceptable" image compared to other AfD spokespeople.

=== European Union ===
In 2015, Meuthen stated he was not a "Europe hater" but opposed the Eurozone, claiming the Euro currency had "perverted" European unity. In 2019, he argued that the European People's Party had moved too far to the left and criticised the EPP's decision to expel Viktor Orban's Fidesz party.

=== Immigration ===
Meuthen has expressed opposition to the immigration and asylum policies under Angela Merkel. During an AfD party conference in 2016, he stated "We are opposed to allowing immigration in such large numbers with open eyes that we will no longer recognize our own country in just a few years. The leading culture in Germany is not Islam, but the Christian - occidental culture. The call of the muezzin cannot claim to be as self-evident as the Christian ringing of church bells."

Meuthen has argued that asylum seekers should be granted temporary resident permits as opposed to full citizenship and permanent residency.

During the COVID-19 pandemic in Germany, Meuthen stated that Germany should suspend its membership of the Schengen agreement, arguing that open borders were contributing to the spread of the virus.

=== Foreign policy ===
Meuthen has expressed support for Israel and has called on the German government to ban the Lebanese-based militant group Hezbollah.

=== Resignation and post-AfD life ===
On 28 January 2022, Meuthen declared that he would resign from the party chairmanship with immediate effect and resign from the AfD.

He justified this with the fact that he had lost the power struggle with the formally dissolved right-wing extremist "Der Flügel" wing over the political direction of AfD. Meuthen criticized that the party had developed far to the right and was in large parts no longer concurrent with the liberal democratic basic order in Germany.

In 2024, Meuthen gave a detailed interview to the Financial Times in which he discussed his time as the AfD's leader and the direction of the party. Meuthen said that he had hoped for the AfD to be a "a liberal conservative movement," opposing EU integration and mass immigration, but opined that the party's more radical far-right wing was able to gain influence over the AfD due to better networking compared to the classical liberal and national conservative factions, but said that he remained in the party despite its growing hardline image as the AfD was “the only chance to do something" in changing German politics. In the interview, he stated that he confided in Marine Le Pen on how to remove extremist elements from the party, but said that expelling controversial members of the AfD was more difficult due to German law on the matter. He also claimed to have voted against expelling Björn Höcke to avoid dividing the party and believed that the Der Flügel wing would not gain popularity due to voters seeing it as too extreme, but later felt this decision was "a complete error." Meuthen claimed that he ultimately quit the party after he was unable to fire a senior member of the AfD's federal board who had praised national socialism and said that while Germany still needed much stronger policies to deal with immigration, Islamism and the EU, the AfD would be unable to wield any influence in these areas even with strong support due to the other parties refusing to make deals with it.

=== Centre Party ===
In June 2022 he joined the Centre Party.

Meuthen resigned from the Centre Party in September 2023, citing disagreements over the party's stance on governance.
