= Prudnik Town Hall =

Ratusz w Prudniku (Prudnik Town Hall) Neustadter Rathaus (O.S.)
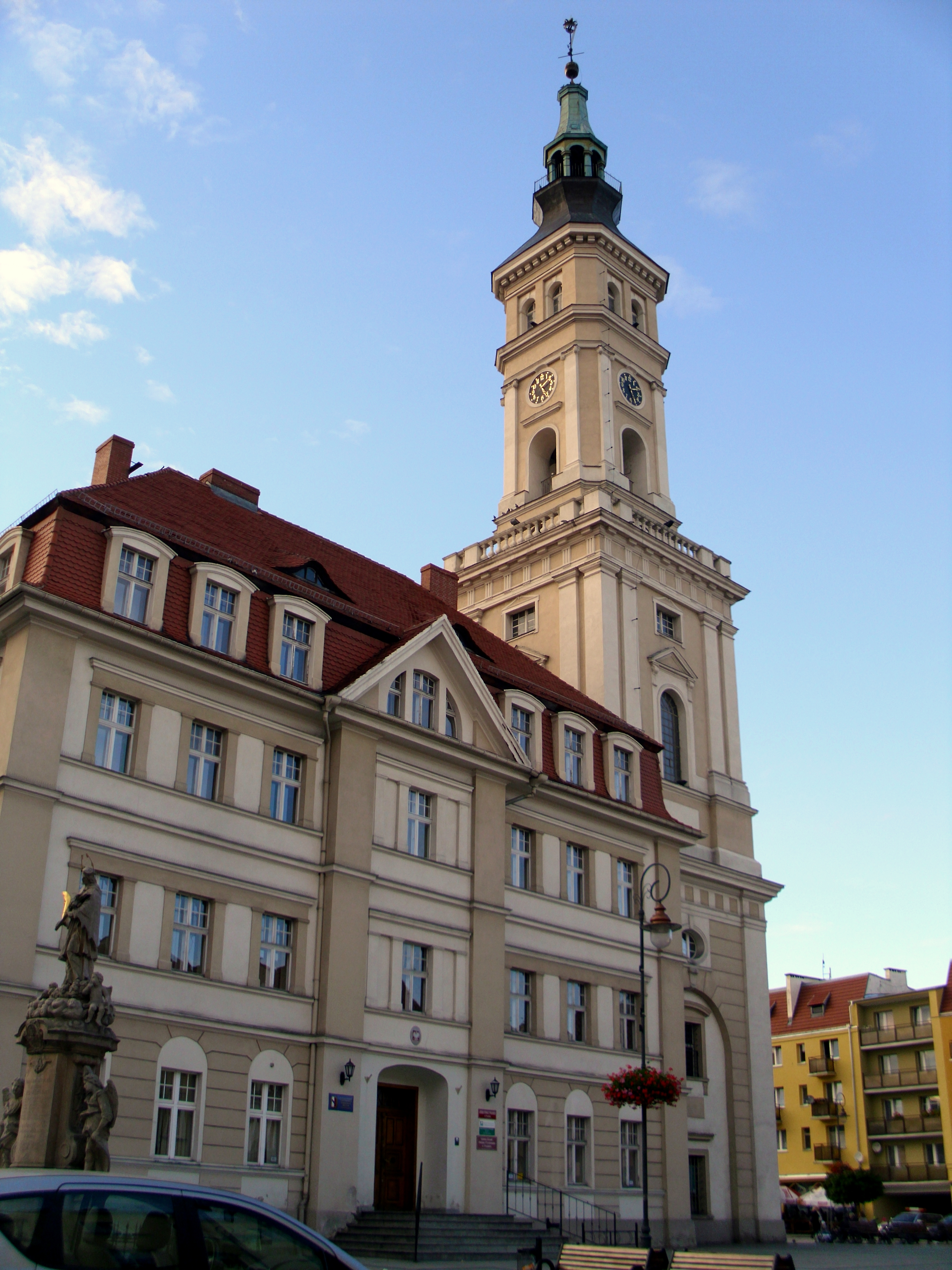
- Prudnik Town Hall
- Interactive map of the Ratusz w Prudniku (Prudnik Town Hall); Neustadter Rathaus (O.S.) area

General information
- Type: Town hall
- Architectural style: Baroque, Classicism
- Location: Prudnik, Poland
- Coordinates: 50.3215°N 17.5806°E
- Completed: 1782

Prudnik Town Hall (German: Neustadter Rathaus) is a historical town hall built in the Classical architectural style, completed in 1782 when the city was part of Prussia. The town hall is located in the centre of the Market Square (Rynek) in Prudnik, Poland.

== History ==
In 1627, the first town hall that was made out of wood was burnt down by the Swedes. The next town hall was built on the same year in a Baroque architectural style. It was damaged in 1650, 1653, 1735, and 1779.

The town hall was rebuilt in 1782 by architect Thomas from Schweidnitz (now Świdnica).

In between 1840 and 1842, the town hall was reconstructed into the Classical architectural style, its structure remains like so to the current day. During World War II, despite much fighting in the town and the tower's potential military value as a vantage point, the town hall escaped without any damage. It was listed as a heritage building in 1958.

In front of the building there is a fountain from 1696.
