= Sven Felix Kellerhoff =

German historian, journalist, and author

- Born: 1971 (age 54–55)
- Occupations: Author; Journalist
- Writing career
- Language: German
- Genres: Non-fiction; History of the Nazi era

Sven Felix Kellerhoff (born 1971) is a German historian, journalist and author who specialises in the history of the Nazi era.

== Education and career ==
Kellerhoff was born in 1971 in Stuttgart, Germany. He was educated at the Free University of Berlin and the Berlin School of Journalism. Since 2003, Kellerhoff has been the Chief Editor of Contemporary and Cultural History at Die Welt. Prior to Die Welt, he worked at the Berliner Morgenpost and Berliner Zeitung.

== Non-fiction author ==
Kellerhoff has published more than twenty book titles during his career. Among his works is a history of the Nazi Party, published in 2017 as Die NSDAP: eine Partei und ihre Mitglieder ("The NSDAP: A Party and its Members"). Among other sources, Kellerhoff utilised the research conducted by American sociologist Theodore Abel. While in Germany on a research project in 1934, Abel launched a competition in cooperation with the Nazi Party to collect life stories of members who had joined the party prior to 1933. He collected 683 biographical sketches, which formed the basis of his report How Hitler Came to Power.

== Publications ==
=== In German ===
- Deutsche Legenden. Vom ‚Dolchstoß‘ und anderen Mythen der Geschichte. With Lars-Broder Keil. Links Verlag, Berlin, 2002, ISBN 3-86153-257-3.
- Attentäter – Mit einer Kugel die Welt verändern. Böhlau Verlag, Köln, 2003, ISBN 3-412-03003-1.
- Als die Tage zu Nächten wurden – Berliner Schicksale im Bombenkrieg. Wieland Giebel (Eds.), Berlin Story Verlag, 2003, ISBN 3-929829-12-6.
- Hitlers Berlin. Geschichte einer Hassliebe. be.bra Verlag, Berlin 2005, ISBN 3-89809-061-2.
- Berlin unterm Hakenkreuz. Berlin Edition, Berlin 2006, ISBN 3-8148-0147-4.
- Mythos Führerbunker. Hitlers letzter Unterschlupf. Berlin Story Verlag, Berlin 2006, ISBN 3-929829-43-6.
- Gerüchte machen Geschichte. Folgenreiche Falschmeldungen im 20. Jahrhundert (with Lars-Broder Keil), Links Verlag, Berlin 2006, ISBN 3-86153-386-3.
- Ortstermin Mitte – Auf Spurensuche in Berlins Innenstadt. Berlin Story Verlag, Berlin 2007, ISBN 978-3-929829-57-0.
- Reichstagsbrand. Die Karriere eines Kriminalfalls. be.bra, Berlin 2008, ISBN 3-89809-078-7.
- Die Fluchttunnel von Berlin. With Dietmar Arnold, Propyläen, Berlin 2008, ISBN 978-3-549-07341-4.
- "Kristallnacht": das Novemberpogrom 1938 und die Verfolgung der Berliner Juden 1924 bis 1945. Berlin-Story-Verlag, Berlin 2008, ISBN 978-3-929829-66-2.
- Die Stasi und der Westen. Der Kurras-Komplex. Hoffmann und Campe, Hamburg 2010, ISBN 978-3-455-50145-2.
- Aus der Geschichte lernen. In: Handbuch zur Aufarbeitung von Diktaturen. Ein Projekt im Rahmen der Deutsch-Tunesischen Transformationspartnerschaft „Contre l'oubli“. Hrsg. Auswärtiges Amt; Gedenkstätte Berlin-Hohenschönhausen. Nomos, Baden-Baden 2013, ISBN 978-3-8487-0973-1.
- Heimatfront. Der Untergang der heilen Welt – Deutschland im Ersten Weltkrieg. Quadriga Verlag, Köln 2014, ISBN 978-3-86995-064-8.
- Hitlers Ende. Der Untergang im Führerbunker. Berlin-Story-Verlag, Berlin 2015, ISBN 978-3-86368-019-0.
- «Mein Kampf». Die Karriere eines deutschen Buches. Klett-Cotta, Stuttgart 2015, ISBN 978-3-608-94895-0. Ebook ISBN 978-3-608-10839-2. Rezensionen u. a. in the Journal of History, ZFG, in der Süddeutschen Zeitung, SZ
- Die NSDAP. Eine Partei und ihre Mitglieder. Klett-Cotta, Stuttgart 2017, ISBN 978-3-608-98103-2.

=== In English ===
- Kellerhoff, Sven (2004). The Führer Bunker. Berlin: Berlin Story Verlag. ISBN 978-3-929829-23-5.
