= Anton Baron =

German politician (born 1987)

Member of the Landtag of Baden-Württemberg
- Incumbent
- Assumed office 11 May 2016

Personal details
- Born: 3 November 1987 (age 38)
- Party: Alternative for Germany (since 2014)

Anton Baron (born 3 November 1987) is a Soviet-born German politician serving as a member of the Landtag of Baden-Württemberg since 2016. He has served as group leader of the Alternative for Germany since 2023.
