= Peter Felser =

German politician (born 1969)

Member of the Bundestag
- Incumbent
- Assumed office 24 October 2017

Personal details
- Born: 20 September 1969 (age 56) Dillingen an der Donau
- Party: AfD

Peter Felser (born 20 September 1969 in Dillingen an der Donau) is a German politician for the populist Alternative for Germany (AfD) and since 2017 member of the Bundestag.

== Life and politics ==
Felser was born 1969 in the Bavarian town Dillingen an der Donau and studied at the University of the Bundeswehr Munich.

Felser entered the AfD in 2015 and became after the 2017 German federal election member of the Bundestag.

Felser denies the scientific consensus on climate change.
