= Sebastian Münzenmaier =

German politician

Member of the Bundestag
- Incumbent
- Assumed office 2017

Personal details
- Born: 2 July 1989 (age 37) Darmstadt, Germany
- Party: AfD

Sebastian Münzenmaier (born 2 July 1989) is a German politician. Born in Darmstadt, Hesse, he represents Alternative for Germany (AfD). Münzenmaier has served as a member of the Bundestag from the state of Rhineland-Palatinate since 2017.

Münzenmaier was convicted in 2018 with the verdict becoming final of aiding and abetting dangerous bodily harm. He had assisted hooligans in beating up fans of an opposing football club.

== Biography ==
Münzenmaier was a member of the German Freedom Party before joining the AfD in 2013. He became member of the Bundestag after the 2017 German federal election. He is a member of the Committee for Tourism.

Münzenmaier is a deputy leader of AfD's parliamentary group.
