= Martin Hess (politician) =

German politician (born 1971)

Member of the Bundestag
- Incumbent
- Assumed office 24 October 2017

Personal details
- Born: 11 January 1971 (age 55) Hechingen, West Germany
- Party: AfD

Martin Hess (born 11 January 1971 in Hechingen) is a German politician for the far-right party Alternative for Germany (AfD) and since 2017 member of the Bundestag. He is the deputy domestic policy spokesperson for his parliamentary group.

== Life and career ==
After graduating high school, Hess trained with the Baden-Württemberg state police starting in 1990. In 1993, he became a police officer and worked for the police in various operational positions until 2010. At the same time, he completed a degree in police administration from 2001 to 2004. From 2010, he worked as a lecturer in the training and further education of police officers, most recently from 2014 at the Böblingen Institute for Further Education at the Baden-Württemberg Police University. He was taken out of service in 2017 to fulfill his parliamentary mandate. Hess lives in Bietigheim-Bissingen, is non-denominational, single and has one son.

== Political career ==
Hess entered the newly founded Alternative for Germany (AfD) in 2013. In an interview with the Stuttgarter Zeitung newspaper, he stated that his reason for joining the party was that he opposed the European states' treatment of countries in distress due to the euro crisis and instead favoured compliance with the no-bailout clause.

Hess initially held various offices in the party at the local and district level. From March 2017 to February 2019, he was deputy spokesperson for the AfD Baden-Württemberg. Alongside other AfD members of parliament and members of the federal executive, Hess is a member of an AfD working group formed in September 2018 to develop strategies to prevent the party or individual members and groups from being monitored by the offices to protect of the constitution.

In February 2019, Hess lost a crucial vote at a state political convention (Landesparteitag) of the AfD in Baden-Württemberg against Dirk Spaniel and was defeated by 341 votes to 371. Shortly before the election party conference, there was speculation in an anonymous email sent to the party's internal mailing list as to whether Hess had been "infiltrated" into the party by the domestic intelligence service. Hess told DPA that these "untrue and reputation-damaging allegations" had contributed significantly to his defeat and prompted him to take legal action against the author. The AfD state executive also announced a criminal complaint.

=== Bundestag mandate ===
Hess became a member of the Bundestag, the German federal law-making body in 2017. He was elected by the AfD Baden-Württemberg in November 2016 for the 2017 Bundestag election in 7th place on the list and was a direct candidate in the Ludwigsburg constituency. Hess could have stood in the Neckar-Zaber constituency; however, as this was occupied by Marc Jongen, according to Hess, he switched to the Ludwigsburg constituency. In the election, Hess was the only AfD direct candidate in Baden-Württemberg who received more first votes in his constituency than his party received second votes in this constituency. In the 19th German Bundestag, Hess was a full member of the Committee on Internal Affairs and Home land Affairs; he was also a deputy member of the Defence Committee. After the 2021 Bundestag election, he entered the 20th Bundestag in second place on the state list. In December 2021, the AfD nominated him as Chairman of the Bundestag Committee on Internal Affairs and Homeland Affairs. In the secret ballot on 15 December 2021, 6 voted for him and 40 voted against him.

== Positions ==
=== Border controls ===
Hess considers the border policy in the wake of the refugee crisis in Europe from 2015 onwards to be the main cause of the alleged deterioration in the security situation. In 2017, he expressed satisfaction that the German government was handling the refugee policy more restrictively than in 2015. Nevertheless, Hess spoke out in favour of further tightening in 2018: He called for border crossings to be permanently controlled again and for people without authorisation to enter the country to be turned back. Hess also favours replacing cash benefits for asylum seekers with benefits in kind. In 2017, he also criticised the suspension of the third-country regulation in the wake of the refugee crisis.

=== Detention of dangerous persons ===
Hess repeatedly called for Islamist "Gefährder" to be deported more quickly and detained until deportation. He claimed that the safety of the population could not be guaranteed otherwise; the security authorities could not monitor "Gefährder" without gaps.

=== Left-wing extremism ===
Hess argued (among other things in early 2020) for an "anti-extremist basic consensus in politics and society" that rejects extremist movements of all stripes and does not tolerate left-wing extremist activities. In 2019, Hess proposed to the Bundestag that the internet portal Indymedia, which is monitored by the Office for the Protection of the Constitution, be banned. He called for a ban on the Interventionist Left and warned against trivialising left-wing extremism after violent clashes between left-wing extremists and the police in Connewitz on New Year's Day 2020.

=== Weapons law ===
In the Bundestag in 2020, Hess spoke out against establishing knife ban zones and tightening gun laws. He described such measures to combat gun misuse as "political actionism", as he feared that potential perpetrators would not abide by the relevant laws anyway.
