= Peter Boehringer =

German politician

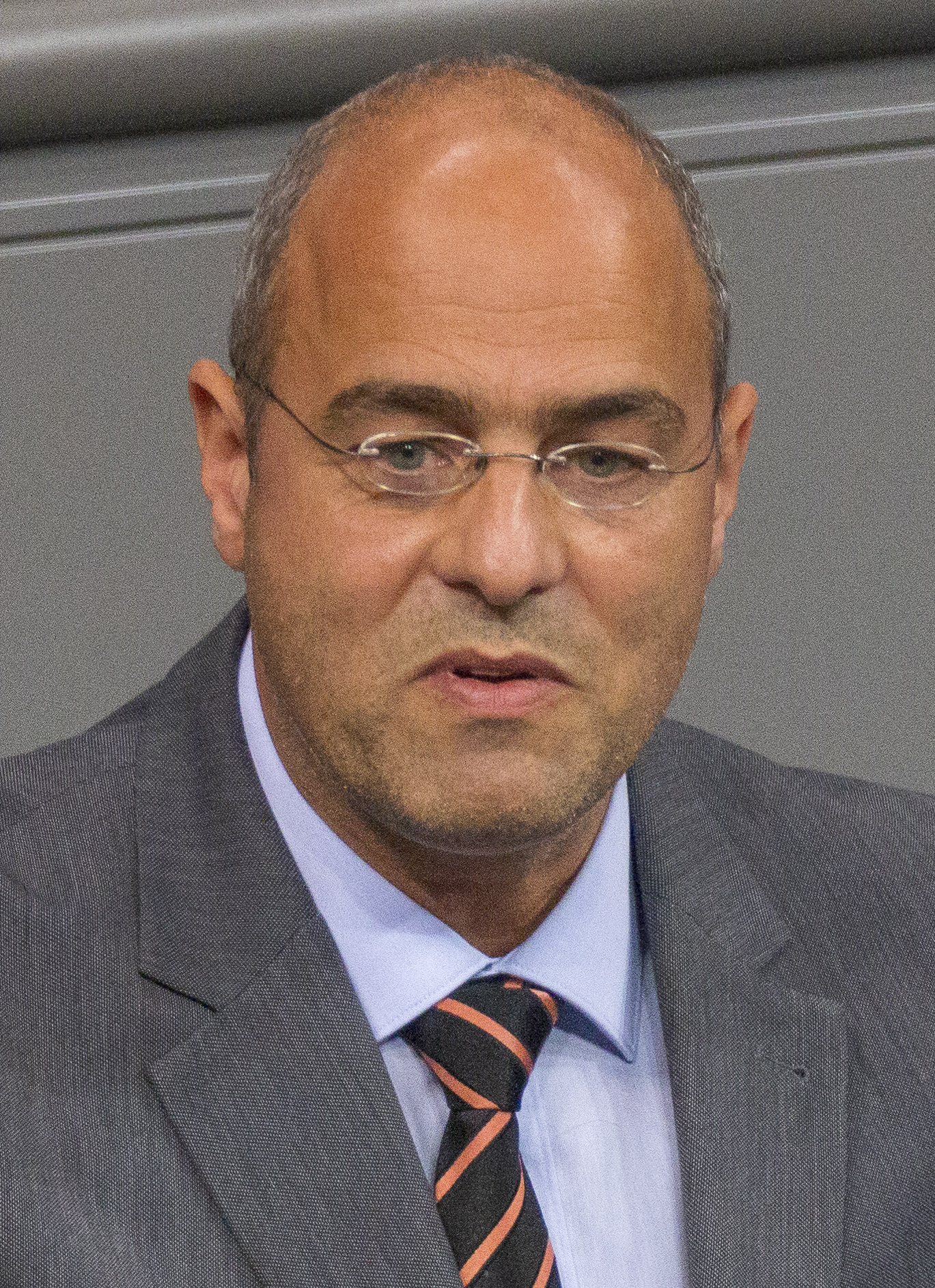
- Boehringer in 2020

Member of the Bundestag
- Incumbent
- Assumed office 24 October 2017

Personal details
- Born: 6 April 1969 (age 57) Schwäbisch Gmünd, West Germany
- Party: AfD

Peter Boehringer (born 6 April 1969) is a German politician for the far-right party Alternative for Germany (AfD) and, since 2017, a member of the Bundestag, the federal legislative body. From 2018 until 2021, he was Chairman of the Budgetary Committee of the German Bundestag.

== Life and achievements ==
Boehringer was born 1969 in the West German town of Schwäbisch Gmünd and studied at the EBS University of Business and Law. He has a Master of Business Administration.

Boehringer is member of the German libertarian Friedrich-August-von-Hayek-Stiftung.

In 2015, Boehringer entered the populist AfD and became member of the Bundestag in 2017.

He gained some media attention after a foul-worded group email from him became public in which he called the German chancellor Angela Merkel 'Merkelnutte', using a German term for prostitute.

Boehringer denies the scientific consensus on climate change.
