= Chemnitz (electoral district) =

Federal electoral district of Germany

161 Chemnitz
- Electoral district for the Bundestag
- Chemnitz in 2025
- State: Saxony
- Population: 246,300 (2019)
- Electorate: 188,691 (2021)
- Major settlements: Chemnitz
- Area: 221.1 km^{2}

Current electoral district
- Created: 1990
- Party: AfD
- Member: Alexander Gauland
- Elected: 2025

Chemnitz is an electoral constituency (German: Wahlkreis) represented in the Bundestag. It elects one member via first-past-the-post voting. Under the current constituency numbering system, it is designated as constituency 161. It is located in western Saxony, comprising the city of Chemnitz.

Chemnitz was created for the inaugural 1990 federal election after German reunification. Since 2025, it has been represented by Alexander Gauland of Alternative for Germany (AfD).

== Geography ==
Chemnitz is located in western Saxony. As of the 2021 federal election, it is coterminous with the independent city of Chemnitz.

== History ==
Chemnitz was created after German reunification in 1990, then known as Chemnitz I. It acquired its current name in the 2002 election. In the 1990 through 1998 elections, it was constituency 323 in the numbering system. In the 2002 and 2005 elections, it was number 164. In the 2009 election, it was number 163. In the 2013 through 2021 elections, it was number 162. From the 2025 election, it has been number 161.

Originally, the constituency comprised the Stadtbezirke of Mitte-Nord, West, and Süd I from the independent city of Chemnitz. It acquired its current borders in the 2002 election.

Election	No.	Name	Borders
1990	323	Chemnitz I	Chemnitz city (only Mitte-Nord, West, and Süd I Stadtbezirke)
1994	323	Chemnitz I	Chemnitz city (only Mitte-Nord, West, and Süd I Stadtbezirke)
1998	323	Chemnitz I	Chemnitz city (only Mitte-Nord, West, and Süd I Stadtbezirke)
2002	164	Chemnitz	Chemnitz city
2005	164	Chemnitz	Chemnitz city
2009	163	Chemnitz	Chemnitz city
2013	162	Chemnitz	Chemnitz city
2017	162	Chemnitz	Chemnitz city
2021	162	Chemnitz	Chemnitz city
2025	161	Chemnitz	Chemnitz city

== Members ==
The constituency was first represented by Rudolf Meinl of the Christian Democratic Union (CDU) from 1990 to 1998. It was won by Jelena Hoffmann of the Social Democratic Party (SPD) in 1998. She was succeeded by fellow SPD member Detlef Müller in the 2005 election. Frank Heinrich of the CDU was elected in 2009, and re-elected in 2013 and 2017. Former member Müller regained the constituency for the SPD in 2021. Since 2025, the seat has been held by Alexander Gauland of the AfD.

Election	Member	Party	%
1990	Rudolf Meinl	CDU	43.1
1994	Rudolf Meinl	CDU	43.1
1998	Jelena Hoffmann	SPD	32.4
2002	Jelena Hoffmann	SPD	35.0
2005	Detlef Müller	SPD	28.4
2009	Frank Heinrich	CDU	34.1
2013	Frank Heinrich	CDU	41.7
2017	Frank Heinrich	CDU	26.6
2021	Detlef Müller	SPD	25.1
2025	Alexander Gauland	AfD	32.2

== Election results ==
=== 2025 election ===
Federal election (2025): Chemnitz
Notes:	Blue background denotes the winner of the electorate vote. Pink background denotes a candidate elected from their party list. Yellow background denotes an electorate win by a list member, or other incumbent. A ✓ or ✗ denotes status of any incumbent, win or lose respectively.						
Party	Candidate	Votes	%	±%	Party votes	%	±%
AfD	Alexander Gauland	46,418	32.2	▲10.3	47,095	32.7	11.1
CDU	Nora Seitz	30,849	21.4	▲2.9	28,020	19.4	▲4.6
SPD	✗ Detlef Müller	24,106	16.7	▼8.4	16,006	11.1	▼12.3
Left	Marten Richard Henning	14,354	10.0	▼1.0	17,643	12.2	▲1.5
BSW	Christian Schweiger	13,198	9.2	New	15,503	10.7	New
Greens	Christin Furtenbacher	6,562	4.6	▼2.6	9,571	6.6	▼2.4
FDP	Norma Grube	3,316	2.3	▼7.7	4,522	3.1	▼8.2
Tierschutzpartei					1,816	1.3	▼0.6
FW	Sven Galambos	2,066	1.4	New	1,402	1.0	▼0.5
PARTEI	Tommy Nguyen	1,510	1.0	▼1.8	912	0.6	▼1.0
Volt	Sebastian Töpper	845	0.6	New	802	0.6	▲0.3
BD	Thomas Goebel	555	0.4	New	442	0.3	New
Humanists	Eric Nils Clausnitzer	365	0.2	New	213	0.1	▼0.1
Pirates					206	0.1	▼0.2
MLPD					73	0.1	Steady
Informal votes		777			695		
Total valid votes		144,144			144,226		
Turnout		144,921	79.1	▲4.5			
AfD gain from SPD	Majority	15,572	10.8	N/A			

=== 2021 election ===
Federal election (2021): Chemnitz
Notes:	Blue background denotes the winner of the electorate vote. Pink background denotes a candidate elected from their party list. Yellow background denotes an electorate win by a list member, or other incumbent. A ✓ or ✗ denotes status of any incumbent, win or lose respectively.						
Party	Candidate	Votes	%	±%	Party votes	%	±%
SPD	Detlef Müller	34,958	25.1	▲9.7	32,616	23.4	▲11.5
AfD	Michael Klonovsky	30,502	21.9	▼2.1	30,089	21.6	▼2.7
CDU	✗ Frank Heinrich	25,801	18.5	▼8.0	20,713	14.8	▼10.0
Left	Tim Detzner	15,229	10.9	▼8.5	15,008	10.8	▼8.4
FDP	Frank Müller-Rosentritt	13,934	10.0	▲3.4	15,781	11.3	▲3.0
Greens	Karola Köpferl	9,934	7.1	▲2.9	12,680	9.1	▲4.4
Tierschutzpartei					2,620	1.9	▲0.5
PARTEI	Paul Vogel	3,997	2.9	▲0.5	2,280	1.6	▼0.2
dieBasis	Normen Lienow	2,492	1.8		2,097	1.5	
FW					1,997	1.4	▲0.7
Gesundheitsforschung					609	0.4	
Pirates					440	0.3	▼0.3
Bündnis C					378	0.3	
ÖDP	Bert Rohne	679	0.5		359	0.3	0.0
Volt					346	0.2	
V-Partei3	Thomas Lörinczy	622	0.4		320	0.2	0.0
Independent	Daniel Richter	518	0.4				
Independent	Jörg Weidemann	362	0.3				
Team Todenhöfer					311	0.2	
Independent	Hans Röhder	301	0.2				
Humanists					296	0.2	
NPD					252	0.2	▼0.6
The III. Path					164	0.1	
DKP					133	0.1	
MLPD					90	0.1	0.0
Informal votes		1,371			1,121		
Total valid votes		139,329			139,579		
Turnout		140,700	74.6	▼0.6			
SPD gain from CDU	Majority	4,456	3.2				

=== 2017 election ===
Federal election (2017): Chemnitz
Notes:	Blue background denotes the winner of the electorate vote. Pink background denotes a candidate elected from their party list. Yellow background denotes an electorate win by a list member, or other incumbent. A ✓ or ✗ denotes status of any incumbent, win or lose respectively.						
Party	Candidate	Votes	%	±%	Party votes	%	±%
CDU	✓ Frank Heinrich	38,653	26.6	▼15.1	36,270	24.9	▼14.1
AfD	Nico Köhler	34,958	24.0		35,456	24.3	▲18.3
Left	Michael Leutert	28,213	19.4	▼4.5	28,010	19.2	▼3.9
SPD	Detlef Müller	22,413	15.4	▼5.5	17,373	11.9	▼5.6
FDP	Frank Müller-Rosentritt	9,535	6.6	▲4.5	12,184	8.4	▲5.5
Greens	Meike Roden	6,157	4.2	▼0.6	6,818	4.7	▼0.7
PARTEI	Paul Thomas Vogel	3,432	2.4	▲1.2	2,746	1.9	
Tierschutzpartei					2,042	1.4	
NPD					1,149	0.8	▼1.5
FW					1,068	0.7	▼0.1
Pirates	Toni Rotter	1,403	1.0	▼1.1	874	0.6	▼1.9
BGE					478	0.3	
DiB					407	0.3	
ÖDP					308	0.2	
V-Partei³					277	0.2	
BüSo	Stephan Hochstein	789	0.5		255	0.2	0.0
MLPD					156	0.1	0.0
Informal votes		1,665			1,347		
Total valid votes		145,553			145,871		
Turnout		147,218	75.1	▲7.6			
CDU hold	Majority	3,695	2.6	▼15.3			

=== 2013 election ===
Federal election (2013): Chemnitz
Notes:	Blue background denotes the winner of the electorate vote. Pink background denotes a candidate elected from their party list. Yellow background denotes an electorate win by a list member, or other incumbent. A ✓ or ✗ denotes status of any incumbent, win or lose respectively.						
Party	Candidate	Votes	%	±%	Party votes	%	±%
CDU	✓ Frank Heinrich	55,909	41.7	▲7.5	52,380	38.9	▲8.4
Left	Michael Leutert	31,992	23.8	▼4.0	31,014	23.1	▼5.5
SPD	Detlef Müller	28,101	20.9	▲0.8	23,558	17.5	▲0.4
AfD					8,138	6.0	
Greens	Petra Zais	6,475	4.8	▼1.2	7,168	5.3	▼1.8
NPD	Ines Schreiber	4,661	3.5	▲0.6	3,135	2.3	▼0.4
Pirates	Toni Rotter	2,808	2.1		3,298	2.5	
FDP	Kristian Reinhold	2,724	2.0	▼7.0	3,865	2.9	▼9.9
PARTEI	Tobias Göthert	1,505	1.1				
FW					1,081	0.8	
PRO					537	0.4	
MLPD					184	0.1	▼0.1
BüSo					170	0.1	▼0.5
Informal votes		1,701			1,348		
Total valid votes		134,175			134,528		
Turnout		135,876	67.5	▲1.3			
CDU hold	Majority	23,917	17.9	▲11.7			

=== 2009 election ===
Federal election (2009): Chemnitz
Notes:	Blue background denotes the winner of the electorate vote. Pink background denotes a candidate elected from their party list. Yellow background denotes an electorate win by a list member, or other incumbent. A ✓ or ✗ denotes status of any incumbent, win or lose respectively.						
Party	Candidate	Votes	%	±%	Party votes	%	±%
CDU	Frank Heinrich	45,876	34.1	▲6.1	41,081	30.5	▲6.2
Left	Michael Leutert	37,433	27.9	▲1.3	38,448	28.6	▲2.2
SPD	✗ Detlef Müller	27,060	20.1	▼8.3	22,991	17.1	▼9.6
FDP	Robin John	12,106	9.0	▲2.1	17,147	12.7	▲2.9
Greens	Petra Zais	8,109	6.0	▲2.3	9,524	7.1	▲1.6
NPD	Jörg Schubert	3,800	2.8	▼0.1	3,651	2.7	▼0.5
BüSo					813	0.6	▼0.1
REP					537	0.4	▼1.3
MLPD					305	0.2	▲0.1
Informal votes		1,716			1,603		
Total valid votes		134,384			134,497		
Turnout		136,100	66.2	▼9.9			
CDU gain from SPD	Majority	8,443	6.2				

=== 2005 election ===
Federal election (2005):Chemnitz
Notes:	Blue background denotes the winner of the electorate vote. Pink background denotes a candidate elected from their party list. Yellow background denotes an electorate win by a list member, or other incumbent. A ✓ or ✗ denotes status of any incumbent, win or lose respectively.						
Party	Candidate	Votes	%	±%	Party votes	%	±%
SPD	Detlef Müller	44,240	28.4	▼6.6	41,587	26.7	▼8.8
CDU	Michael Lohse	43,711	28.1	▼1.5	37,904	24.3	▼2.2
Left	Klaus Bartl	41,369	26.6	▲5.7	41,092	26.4	▲6.7
FDP	Wolfgang Meyer	10,781	6.9	▲0.9	15,284	9.8	▲2.8
Greens	Annekathrin Giegengack	5,882	3.8	0.0	8,574	5.5	▲0.4
NPD	Winifried Petzold	4,582	2.9		5,018	3.2	▲2.5
REP	Karl Kohlmann	3,093	2.0	▼0.9	2,641	1.7	▼0.4
BüSo	Felix Hoffmann	1,998	1.3		1,063	0.7	▲0.5
Alliance for Health, Peace and Social Justice					1,361	0.9	
PBC					858	0.6	▼0.1
SGP					251	0.2	
MLPD					224	0.1	
Informal votes		2,439			2,238		
Total valid votes		155,656			155,857		
Turnout		158,095	76.0	▲1.5			
SPD hold	Majority	529	0.3				
