= Alexander Gauland =

German politician, lawyer and journalist (born 1941)

Alexander Gauland MdB
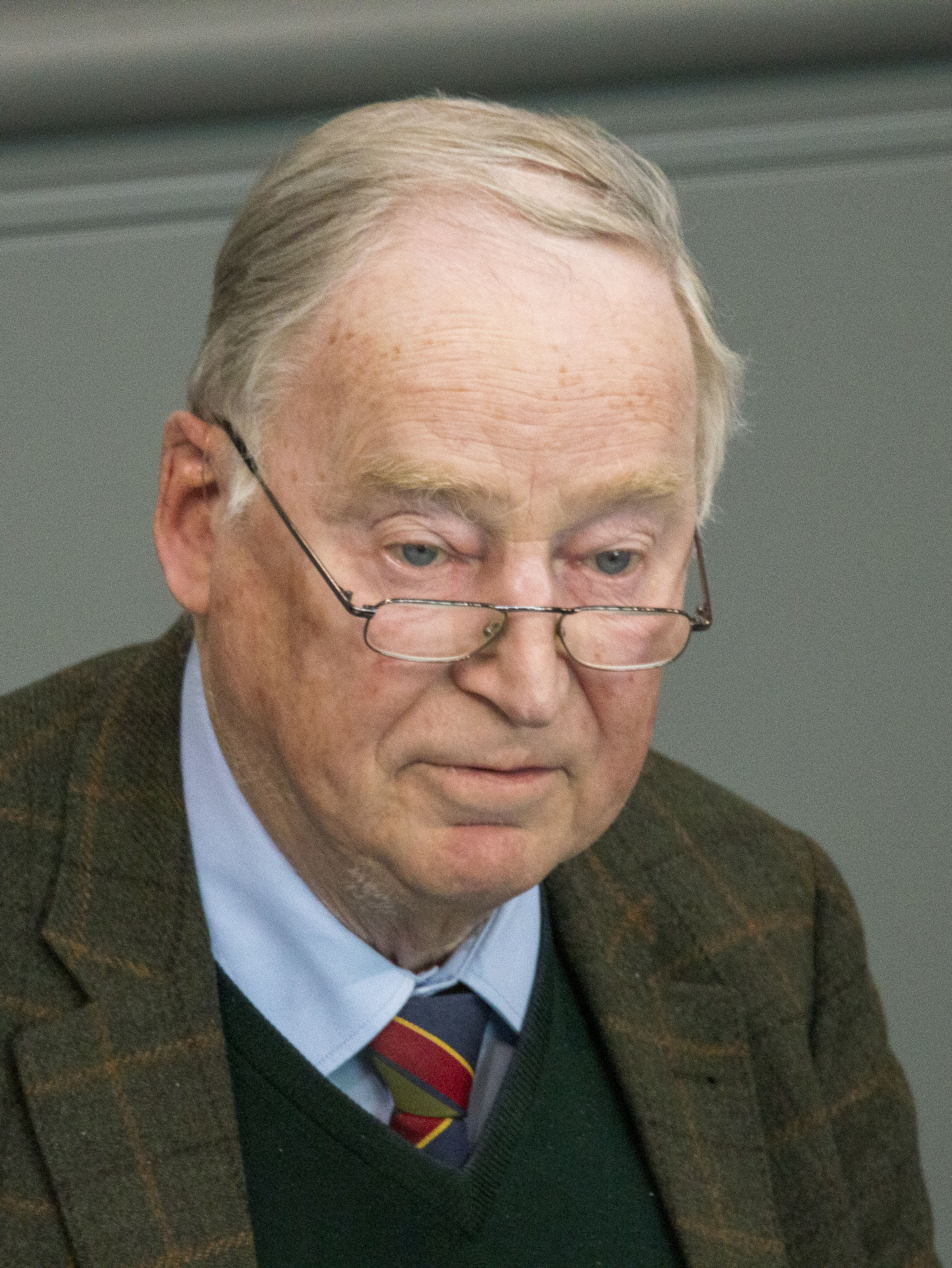
- Gauland in May 2021

Leader of the Alternative for Germany
- In office 2 December 2017 – 30 November 2019 Serving with Jörg Meuthen
- Preceded by: Frauke Petry
- Succeeded by: Tino Chrupalla

Leader of the Opposition
- In office 24 October 2017 – 26 October 2021 Serving with Alice Weidel
- Chancellor: Angela Merkel
- Preceded by: Sahra Wagenknecht; Dietmar Bartsch
- Succeeded by: Ralph Brinkhaus

Leader of the Alternative for Germany in the Bundestag
- In office 26 September 2017 – 30 September 2021 Serving with Alice Weidel
- Chief Whip: Bernd Baumann
- Deputy: Tino Chrupalla; Peter Felser; Leif-Erik Holm; Sebastian Münzenmaier; Beatrix von Storch←
- Preceded by: Position established
- Succeeded by: Tino Chrupalla

State Secretary and Chief of the Hessian State Chancellery
- In office 24 April 1987 – 5 April 1991
- Minister-President: Walter Wallmann
- Preceded by: Paul Leo Giani
- Succeeded by: Hans Joachim Suchan

Member of the Bundestag for Brandenburg
- In office 24 October 2017 – 24 March 2025
- Preceded by: Multi-member district
- Constituency: AfD List
Brandenburg state politics (2014 – 2017)
Leader of the Alternative for Germany in Brandenburg
In office February 2014 – 8 April 2017
Preceded by	Roland Scheel (2013)
Succeeded by	Andreas Kalbitz
Leader of Alternative for Germany in the Landtag of Brandenburg
In office 21 September 2014 – 25 October 2017
Deputy	Birgit Bessin; Thomas Jung
Preceded by	Position established
Succeeded by	Andreas Kalbitz
Member of the Landtag of Brandenburg
In office 8 October 2014 – 25 October 2017
Preceded by	Multi-member district
Succeeded by	Jan-Ulrich Weiß
Constituency	AfD List

Member of the Bundestag for Saxony
- Incumbent
- Assumed office 25 March 2025
- Preceded by: Detlef Müller
- Constituency: Chemnitz

Personal details
- Born: Alexander Eberhardt Gauland; 20 February 1941 (age 85) Chemnitz, German Reich
- Party: Alternative for Germany (since 2013)
- Other political affiliations: Christian Democratic Union (1973–2013)
- Domestic partner: Carola Hein
- Children: 2
- Education: University of Marburg

Eberhardt Alexander Gauland (born 20 February 1941) is a German politician, journalist and lawyer who served as leader of the political party Alternative for Germany (AfD) in the Bundestag from September 2017 to 2021, and co-leader of the party from December 2017 to November 2019. He has been the Member of the Bundestag (MdB) for Chemnitz since March 2025, having previously served on the state list of Brandenburg from September 2017. Gauland was the party's co-founder and was its federal spokesman from 2017 to 2019 and the party leader for the state of Brandenburg from 2013 to 2017.

== Biography ==
Gauland was born in 1941 in Chemnitz, a city that became part of East Germany in 1949 and was renamed Karl-Marx-Stadt. After graduating from high school in 1959, he fled as a refugee to West Germany. He studied political science and law at Marburg, where he also received his doctorate.

In 1972, Gauland entered the Federal Press Office and worked as the Director of the Office of the Mayor of Frankfurt am Main for 10 years.

Afterwards, he became the head of a department of the Federal Ministry for the Environment, Nature Conservation, Building and Nuclear Safety in Bonn and Member of the Hessian Prime Minister's cabinet.

From 1991 to 2006, he worked as an editor of the local newspaper Märkische Allgemeine in Potsdam.

=== Founding the AfD ===
On the morning of 25 March 2010, German Chancellor Angela Merkel publicly promised there would be no direct financial aid to Greece, but reversed that statement hours later by agreeing with the leaders of the Euro countries to send the first of many "rescue packages" to Greece. Gerd Robanus, Assessor in the Federal Executive of the CDU-Business Association cited this as the reason for founding the Alternative for Germany together with Alexander Gauland, Konrad Adam and Bernd Lucke.

In February 2014, Gauland received about 80 percent of the vote during an Extraordinary National Congress in Diedersdorf, becoming chairman of the Brandenburg State Association of Alternative for Germany.

=== Landtag of Brandenburg ===
The AfD got 12.2 percent of the vote in the 2014 Brandenburg state election, enabling it to enter the assembly of that state for the first time. On Tuesday, 10 July 2014 Gauland opened the inaugural session of the Landtag of Brandenburg.

As part of this speech, after quoting Edmund Burke, Gauland wished the other members of parliament "all the strength and the courage, to tackle the tasks now ahead of them, in the interest of the voters and in the interest of the common good".

== Political affiliation and ideals ==
Before becoming an AfD founding member Gauland was a member of the CDU. In 2012 Gauland became involved in the Berliner Kreis ("Berlin circle"), a loose association of federal and state politicians within the CDU, which has been trying for years to make the CDU conservative again, because they consider that under Angela Merkel's leadership it has moved away from these ideals.

He is a supporter of a line that is both conservative on the societal level and liberal on the economic level. He opposed the idea of an aid plan for Greece, which was then plunged into an economic crisis. He called for the closure of Germany's and the European Union's borders, targeting Muslims in particular.

Alexander Gauland said he can not detect any right-wing extremists or radicals at the PEGIDA-Demonstrations. Gauland said: "I do not see right-wing extremists. I see citizens who demonstrate out of concern about developments in Germany, who are afraid. But I haven't seen any right-wing extremists, and we are not the allies of the right-wing extremists, but we are the allies of the people who have these concerns."

In May 2016, Gauland reportedly made comments about Bayern Munich and black German international footballer Jérôme Boateng in a conversation with Frankfurter Allgemeine Sonntagszeitung. The paper cited Gauland, "people like [Boateng] as a footballer, but they don't want to have a Boateng as a neighbour". A controversy arose about this sentence. Gauland defended himself, saying he was fooled by the newspaper and it had been a background discussion, which was classified as confidential and thus not intended for publication. The newspaper refuted this. Gauland added that the effect of the statement – which in his words was meant descriptive – was distorted by the headline of the newspaper, "Gauland insults Boateng" (Gauland beleidigt Boateng). The newspaper had no audio recording of the statement, but independently written memos of two journalists. While Boateng himself stated that he was "saddened" by the statement of Gauland, the German federal government said it was "a vile and sad sentence" (ein niederträchtiger und ein trauriger Satz). But also the FAS was criticised for making "mistakes".

In September 2017, a video emerged of Gauland in which he said that Germany should "be proud of" its soldiers in both world wars and people should no longer "reproach" Germans for the Second World War. He was quoted as saying: "If the French are rightly proud of their emperor and the Britons of Nelson and Churchill, we have the right to be proud of the achievements of the German soldiers in two world wars". He continued, "If I look around Europe, no other people has dealt as clearly with their past wrongs as the Germans." In response, Germany's justice minister tweeted that the statements showed that Gauland's AfD was on the extreme right. Gauland's comment was defended by numerous right-leaning supporters both publicly and on social media.

In 2018, Gauland said "Hitler and the Nazis are just a speck of bird poop in more than 1,000 years of successful German history".

== Position in the AfD ==
Gauland is one of the party founders. From 2013 to 2017, he was party leader in the state Brandenburg and entered the Landtag of Brandenburg in the 2014 election.

He resigned as party leader in Brandenburg, when he led the AfD in the 2017 German federal election next to Alice Weidel, with whom he's now leading the AfD group in the Bundestag. In December 2017, he was elected co-leader of the party next to Jörg Meuthen. In November 2019, he resigned as party leader.

In November 2024, Gauland announced that he would run for Bundestag again, this time in his birthtown of Chemnitz in the state of Saxony. He was AfD's direct candidate in the eponymous district in the 2025 election, and was elected with 32.2% of the vote.

== Personal life ==
Gauland's life companion Carola Hein is editor of a local newspaper, the Märkische Allgemeine, which he had previously edited.

As a 26-year-old man, Gauland suffered from depression. He also suffered a heart attack in 2007, and has been taking medication to lower his blood pressure ever since.

Gauland is a member of the Evangelical Church in Germany. His daughter is a Protestant pastor and publicly distanced herself from her father's statements on refugees in 2016.

== Selected publications ==
=== Journal articles ===
- Gauland, Alexander (1973). "Die Völkerrechtliche Souveränität im Fall der Aufnahme von Staaten in die UNO". Die Öffentliche Verwaltung.

=== Books ===
- Das Legitimitätsprinzip in der Staatenpraxis seit dem Wiener Kongress (= Schriften zum Völkerrecht, Band 20.). Duncker & Humblot, Berlin 1971, ISBN 3-428-02569-5. (Diss., University of Marburg, 1970)
- Gemeine und Lords. Porträt einer politischen Klasse (= Suhrkamp-Taschenbuch, 1650). Suhrkamp Verlag, Frankfurt 1989, ISBN 3-518-38150-4.
- Was ist Konservativismus? Streitschrift gegen die falschen deutschen Traditionen. Westliche Werte aus konservativer Sicht. Eichborn Verlag, Frankfurt am Main 1991, ISBN 3-8218-0454-8.
- Helmut Kohl. Ein Prinzip. Rowohlt Verlag, Berlin 1994, ISBN 3-87134-206-8.
- Das Haus Windsor. Orbis Verlag, Berlin 2000, ISBN 3-572-01124-8. (Licensed by Siedler Verlag, Berlin 1996)
- Anleitung zum Konservativsein. Deutsche Verlags-Anstalt, Stuttgart u. a. 2002, ISBN 3-421-05649-8.
- Kleine deutsche Geschichte. Von der Stauferzeit bis zum Mauerfall. Rowohlt Verlag, Berlin 2007, ISBN 978-3-87134-582-1.
- Die Deutschen und ihre Geschichte. wjs verlag, Berlin 2009, ISBN 3-937989-56-0.
- Fürst Eulenburg – ein preußischer Edelmann. Die konservative Alternative zur imperialen Weltpolitik Wilhelm II. Strauss Edition, Potsdam 2010, ISBN 978-3-86886-018-4.
