= Chinese German =

Chinese German or German Chinese may be:

- Of or relating to Sino-German relations
- Chinese people in Germany
- Chinese as a foreign language in Germany
- Germans in China
  - Kiautschou Bay concession
