= China–Germany relations =

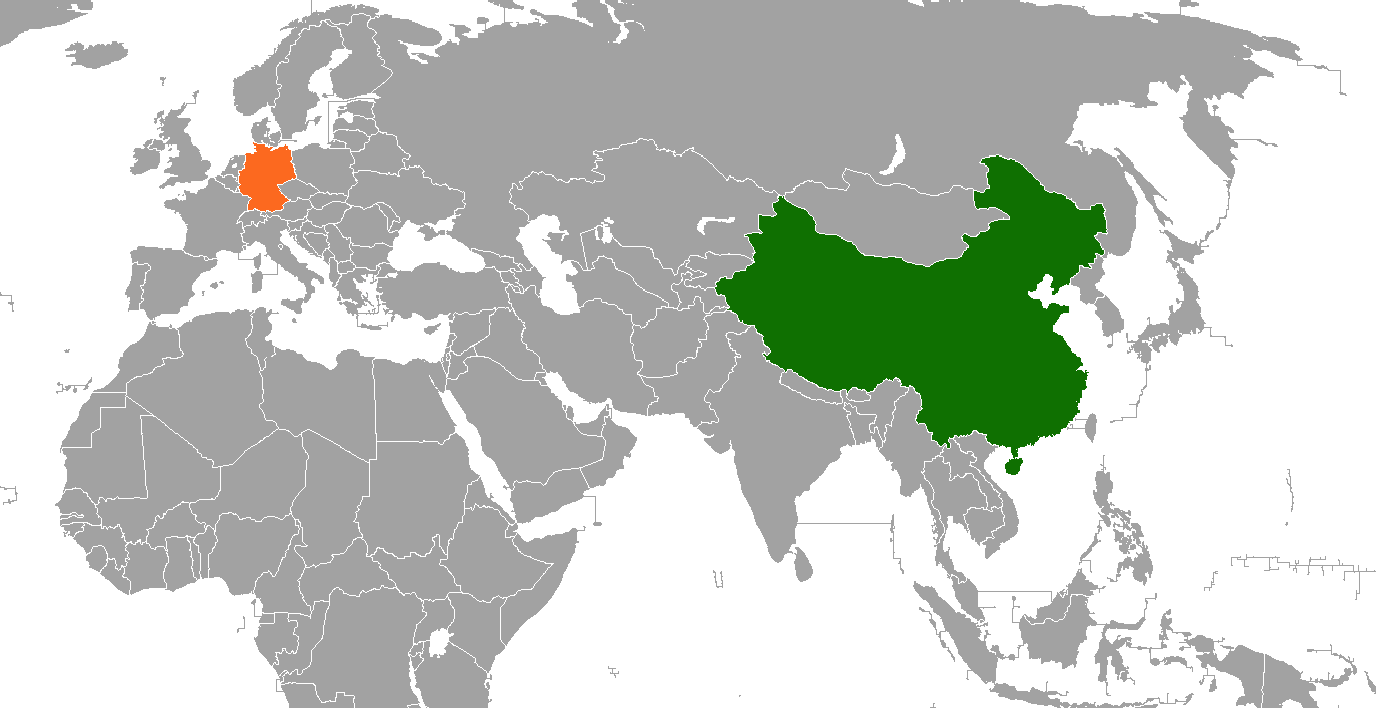

- China: Germany

China–Germany relations (Note: (German: chinesish-deutsche Beziehungen oder Beziehungen zwischen China und Deutschland; simplified Chinese: 中德关系; traditional Chinese: 中德關係; pinyin: Zhōng-Dé guānxì)), also called Sino-German relations, are the international relations between China and Germany. Until 1914, the Germans leased concessions in China, including little parts of Yantai City and Qingdao on Shandong Peninsula. After World War I, during which the Germans lost all their leased territories in China, Sino-German relations gradually improved as German military advisers assisted the Kuomintang government's National Revolutionary Army, though this would change during the 1930s as Adolf Hitler gradually allied himself with Japan.

During the aftermath of the Eastern Front (World War II), Germany was divided into two states: a liberal and democratic West Germany and a communist East Germany. Cold War tensions led to a West German alliance with the United States against communism and thus allied against the People's Republic of China (PRC). The Eastern part was allied with the PRC through the Soviet Union. After German reunification, relations between Germany and China improved.

== History ==
=== Early contacts ===
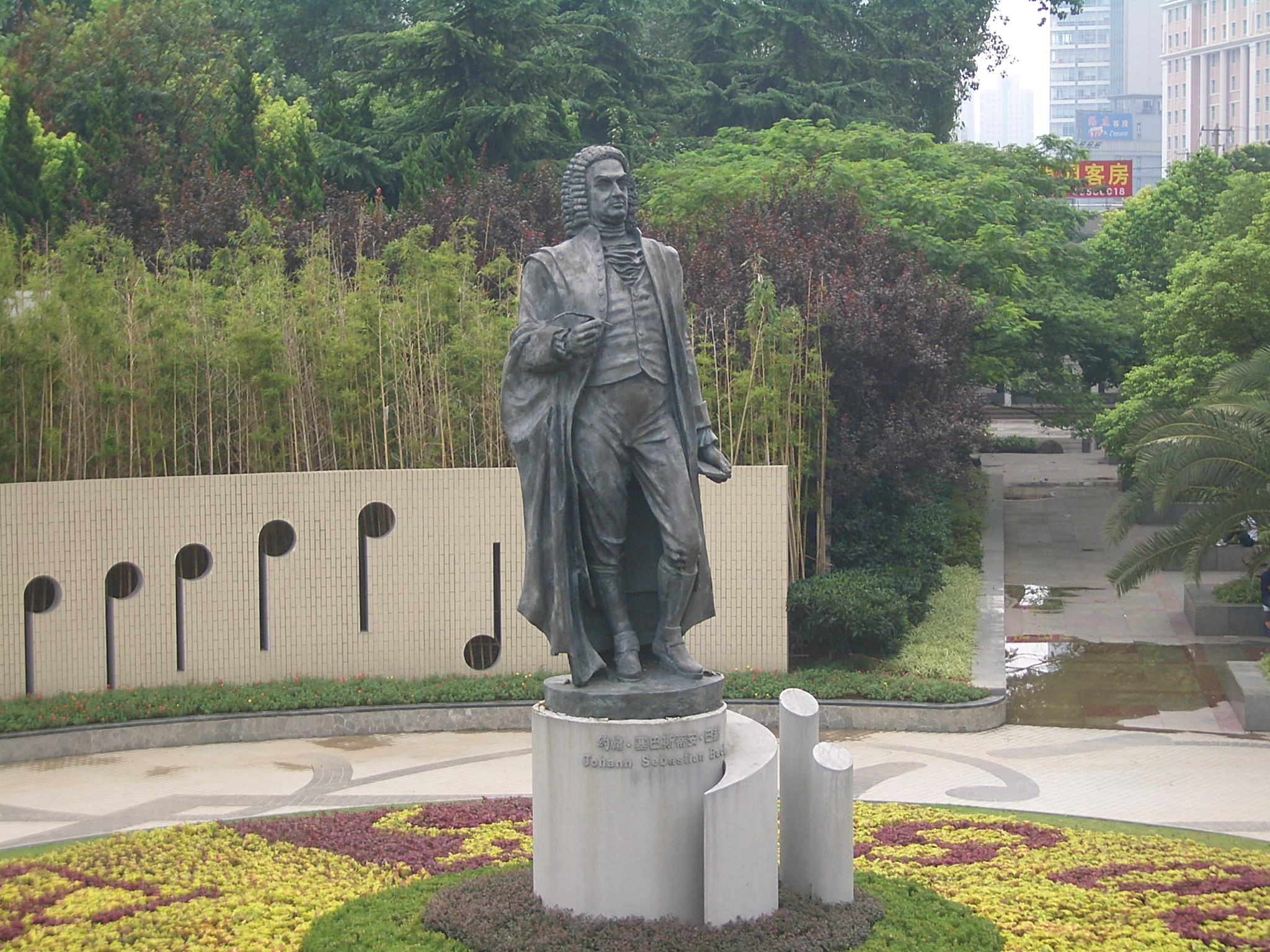
A statue of German composer J. S. Bach outside the entrance of Shanghai's main railway station; Bach never visited China.

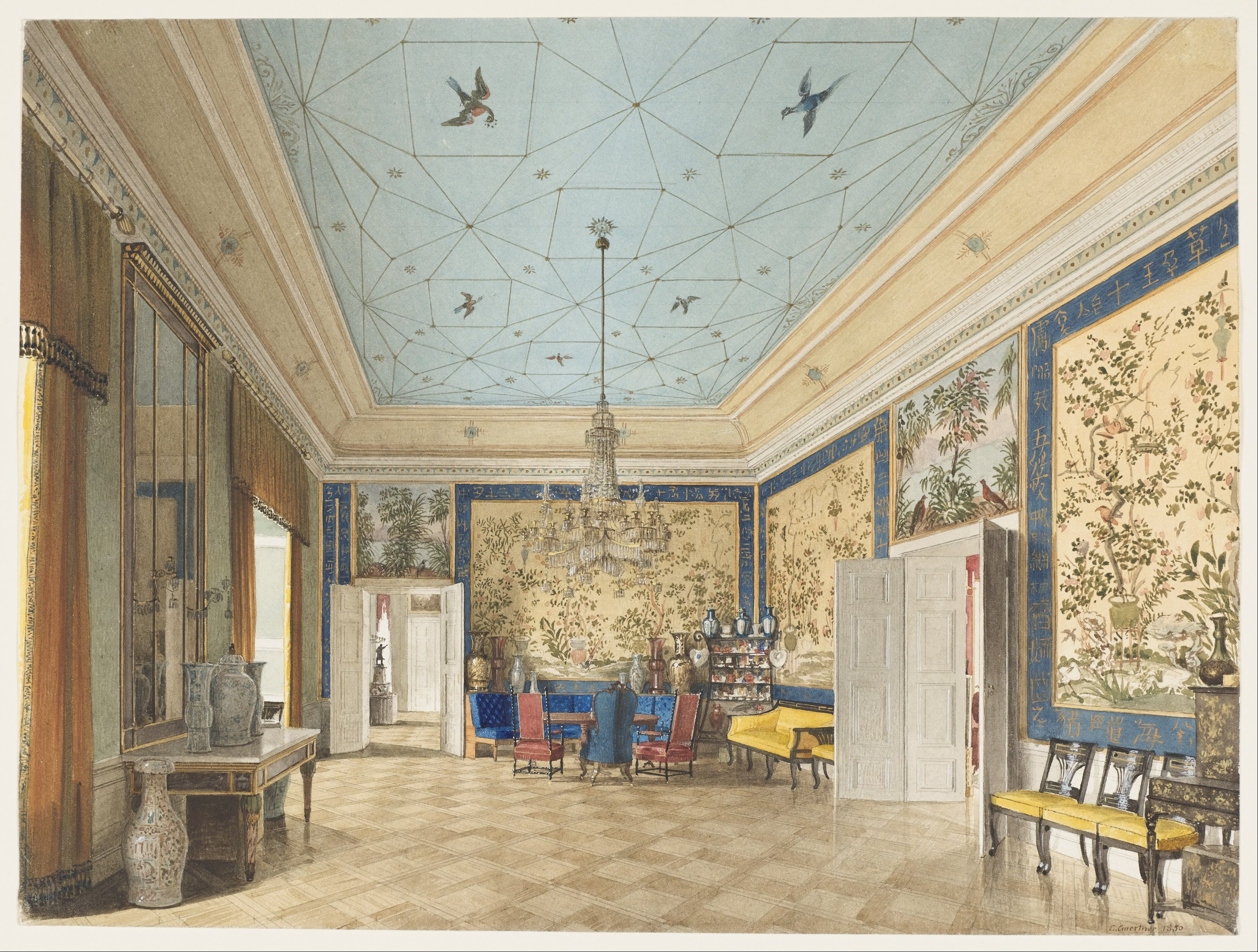
The Chinese Room in the Berlin Palace was decorated and furnished in Chinese styles. This is Eduard Gaertner's 19th century painting of the room.

Unlike Portugal or the Netherlands, German states were not involved, on the state level, in the early (16th-17th centuries) contacts between Europe and China. Nonetheless, a number of individual Germans reached China at that time, in particular as Jesuit missionaries. Some of them played a significant role in China's history, as did Johann Adam Schall von Bell (in China in 1619–1666), who was in Beijing when it was taken by the Manchus in 1644, and soon became a trusted counselor of the early Qing leaders. Meanwhile, in Rome another German Jesuit, Athanasius Kircher, who never got to go to China himself, used reports of other Jesuits in China to compile China Illustrata, a work that was instrumental in popularizing knowledge about China among 17th-century European readers.

The earliest Sino-German trade occurred overland through Siberia, and was subject to transit taxes by the Russian government. To make trading more profitable, Prussia decided to take the sea route, and the first German merchant ships arrived in Qing China, as part of the Royal Prussian Asian Trading Company of Emden in the 1750s. In 1861, after China's defeat in the Second Opium War, the Treaty of Tientsin was signed, which opened formal commercial relations between various European states, including Prussia, with China.

=== Early diplomatic relations ===
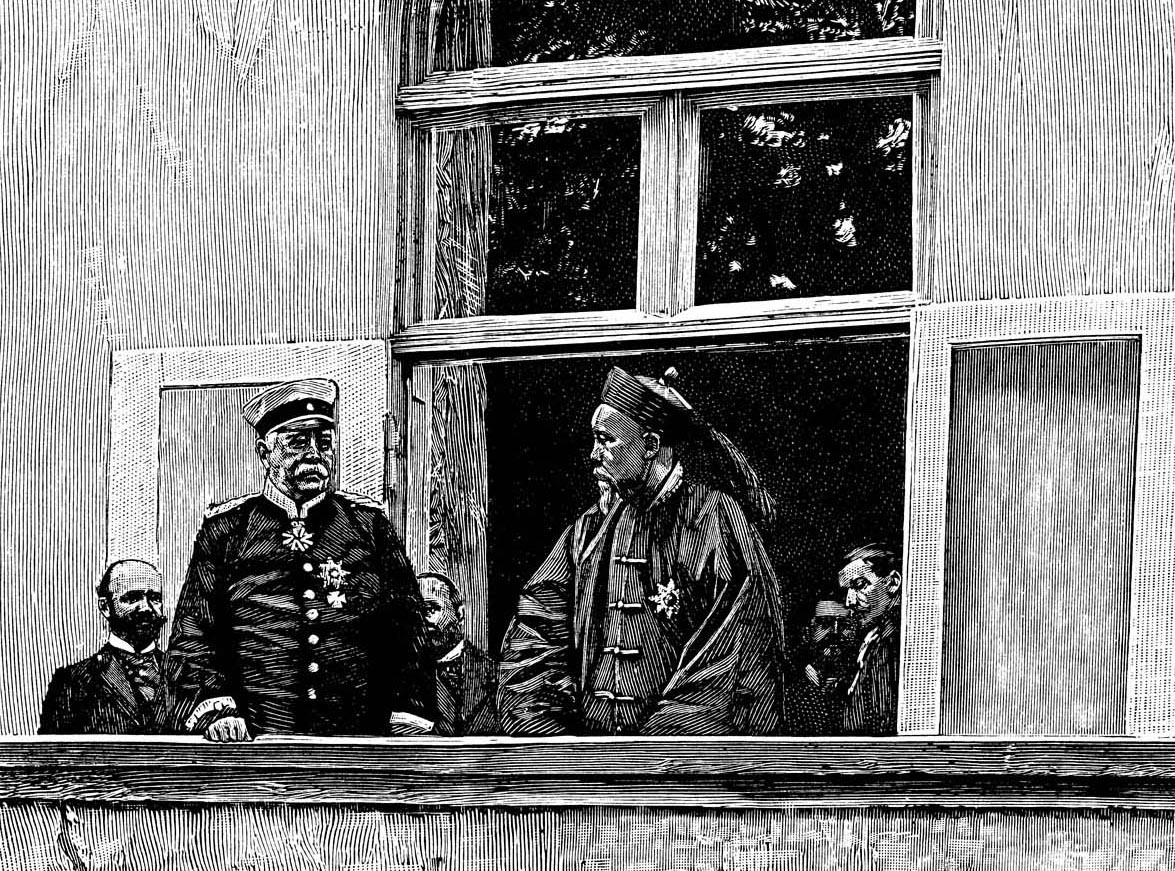
Qing trade minister Li Hongzhang and German chancellor Otto von Bismarck in Bismarck's mansion at Friedrichsruh in 1896.

In 1859, following the Qing dynasty's defeat in the Second Opium War, Prussia sent the Eulenburg Expedition to negotiate commercial treaties with the Qing, the Empire of Japan and Siam. On 2 September 1861, Friedrich Albrecht zu Eulenburg and a representative from the Zongli Yamen signed the Treaty of Tianjin, which opened formal commercial relations between China and Prussia, which represented the German Customs Union. Prussia would later on become the dominant and leading part of the newly founded German Empire. The treaty would govern Sino-German relations until World War I, when the Republic of China repudiated the treaty unilaterally.

During the late 19th century, Sino-foreign trade was dominated by the British Empire, and Otto von Bismarck was eager to establish German footholds in China to balance the British dominance. In 1885, Bismarck had the Reichstag pass a steamship subsidy bill which offered direct service to China. In the same year, he sent the first German banking and industrial survey group to evaluate investment possibilities, which led to the establishment of the Deutsch-Asiatische Bank in 1890. Through these efforts, Germany was second to Britain in trading and shipping in China by 1896.

Due to the decisiveness of steam-powered fleets over the junks of the small Imperial Chinese Navy during China's conflicts with European powers in the mid-nineteenth century, the Chinese began a naval construction program in the 1880s to meet these threats more effectively. They enlisted British and German assistance, and two Dingyuan-class ironclads were ordered from Germany, the Dingyuan and the Zhenyuan.

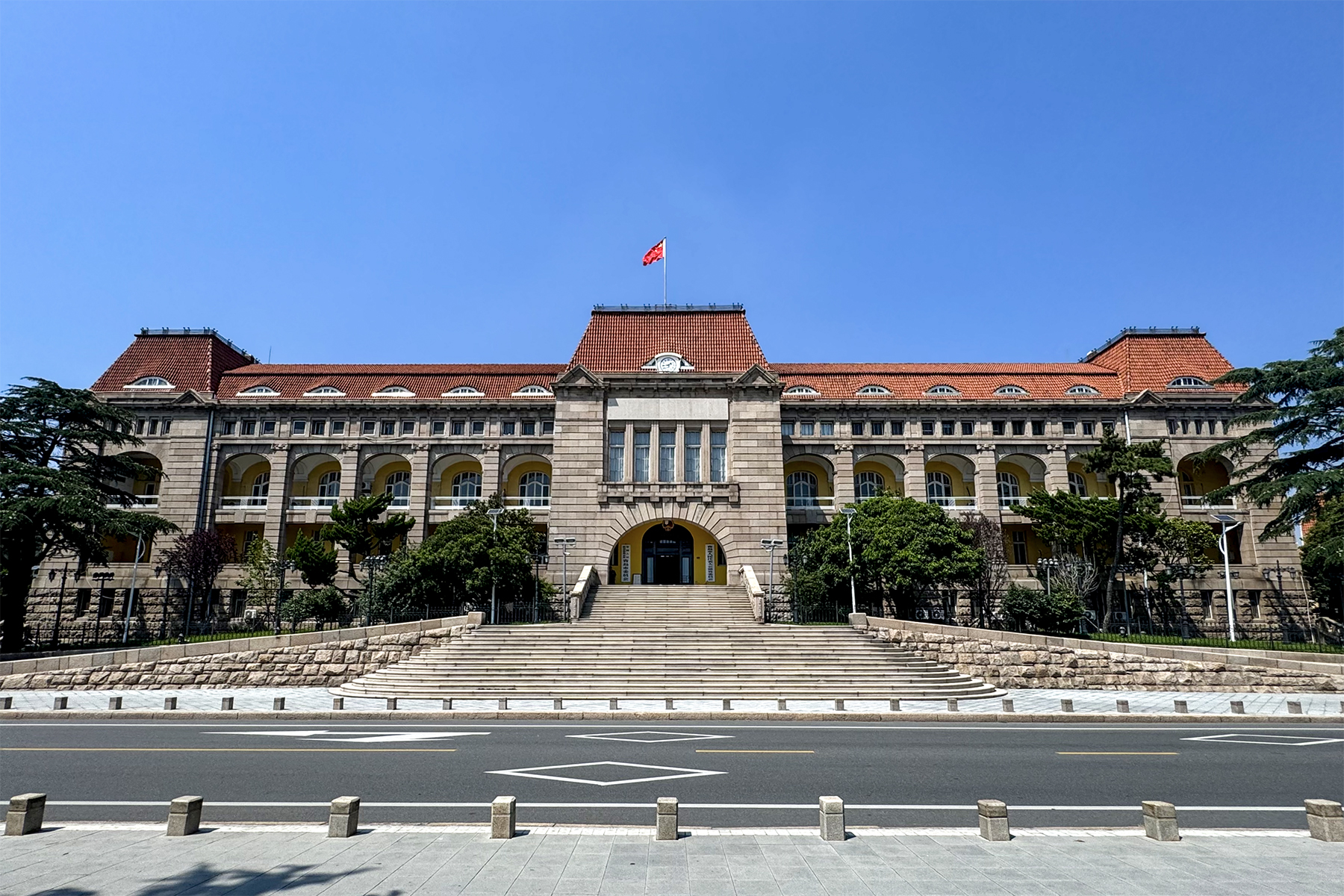
Being colonized and influenced by Germany, Qingdao and Shandong Province have many German remnants, like Tsingtao Brewery, European townhouses, Qingdao–Jinan railway, and many factories and coal mines.

In 1897, the German empire took advantage of the murder of two German missionaries to invade Qingdao and founded the Jiaozhou Bay colony. Germany took control of key points in the Shandong Peninsula. In 1898, it leased for 99 years (or until 1997, as the British did in Hong Kong's New Territories and the French did with Guangzhouwan) Jiaozhou Bay and its port of Qingdao under threat of force. Development was a high priority for Berlin. Over 200 million marks were invested in world-class harbor facilities such as berths, heavy machinery, rail yards, and a floating dry dock. Private enterprise worked across Shandong Province, opening mines, banks, breweries, factories, shops and rail lines.

In 1900, Germany took part in the Eight-Nation Alliance that was sent to relieve the Siege of the International Legations in Beijing during the Boxer Rebellion. The Kaiser called for very harsh punishment of the Chinese, but his soldiers arrived after the fighting was largely over.

In 1907–1908, Kaiser Wilhelm II sent Prince of Bülow, Chancellor at the time, to discuss a potential treaty of triple alliance with the Qing high-ranking official Yuan and President Theodore Roosevelt. But it was overturned in favor of the Gentlemen's Agreement of 1907 and due to the passing of Grand Empress Dowager, Cixi.

During the Xinhai revolution, revolutionaries killed a German arms dealer in Hankou as he was delivering arms to the Qing. Revolutionaries killed 2 Germans and wounded 2 other Germans at the battle of Hanyang, including a former colonel.

=== Early 20th century ===
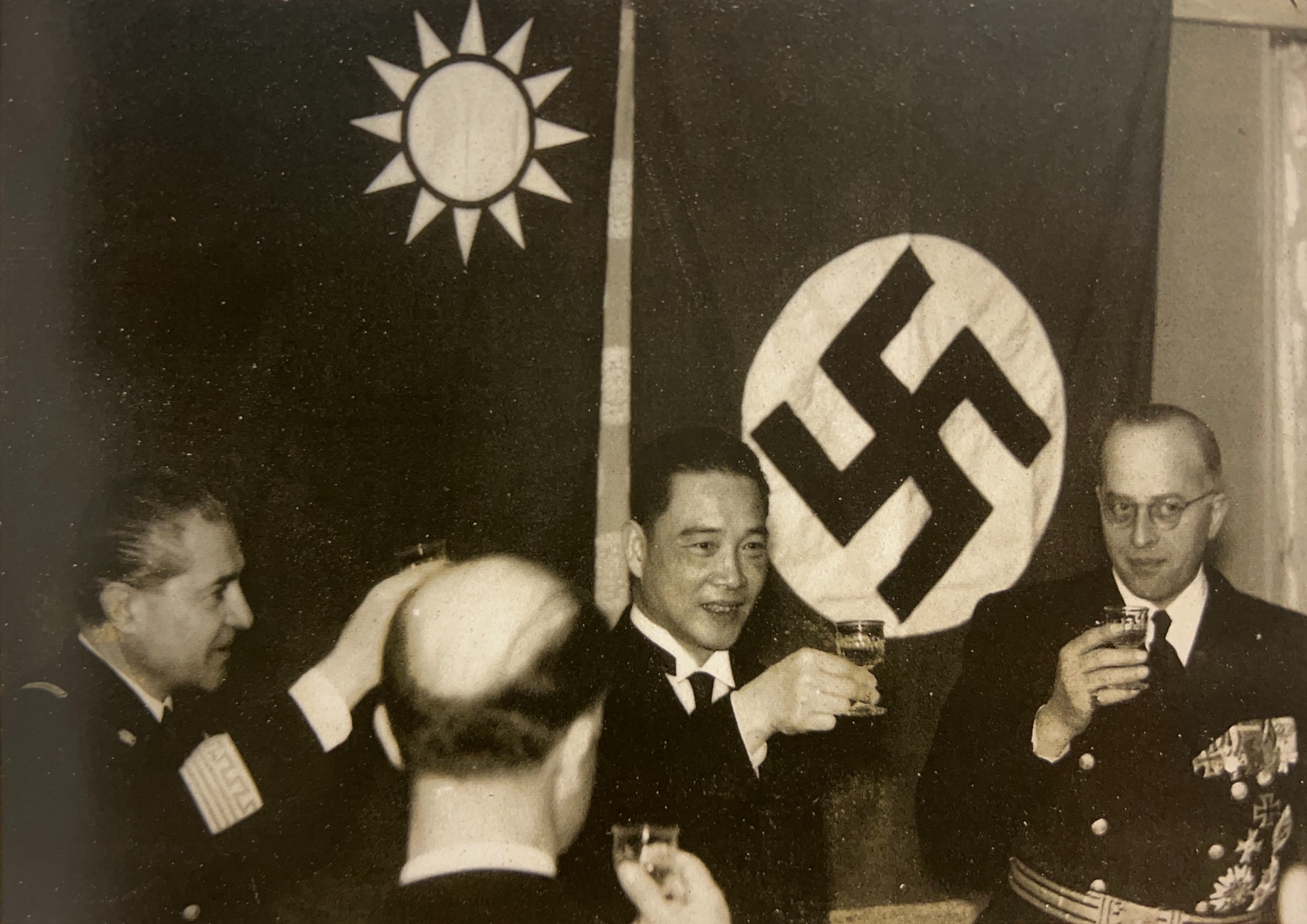
Wang Jingwei with German diplomats as head of the state of Japanese puppet China

The German military had a major role in Republican China. The German Navy's East Asia Squadron was in charge of Germany's concessions at Qingdao, and spent heavily to set up modern facilities that would be a showcase for Asia. The Empire of Japan seized the German operations in 1914 after sharp battles. After World War I, the Weimar Republic provided extensive advisory services to the Republic of China, especially training for the Chinese army. As well as studying and visiting Japan, Germans visited and studied China in between the two World Wars.

In 1921, Germany became the first major European power to sign an equal treaty with China, ending its previous unequal treaty rights.

Colonel General Hans von Seeckt, the former commander of the German army, organized the training of China's elite army units and the beginning of the civil war that included military activities against the Chinese Communists from 1933 to 1935. All military academies had German officers, as did most army units. In addition, German engineers provided expertise and bankers provided loans for China's railroad system. Trade with Germany flourished in the 1920s, with Germany as China's largest supplier of government credit. According to some not confirmed sources in 1937, H.H. Kung visited Germany in an attempt "to convince Hitler to side with China against Japan". With assurances of the contrary, Nazi Germany sided with the Japanese after they invaded China the following month. The last important German advisor left in 1938.

However, at the same time, the exiled German Communist Otto Braun was in China as a Comintern agent, probably sent in 1934, to advise the Chinese Communist Party (CCP) on military strategy and taking a major part in The Long March under a Chinese name, Li De (Chinese: 李德; pinyin: Lǐ Dé); it was only many years later that Otto Braun and "Li De" came to be known as the same person.

=== World War II (1941–1945) ===
Sino-German cooperation collapsed in 1939 due to the start of World War II in Europe, forcing many Chinese nationals to leave Germany due to increased government surveillance and coercion. The example Japan set in the Second Sino-Japanese War forced Hitler to replace China with Japan as the Nazi's strategic ally in East Asia. Following the Japanese Attack on Pearl Harbor in 1941, the Chinese declared war on Germany, which resulted in the Gestapo launching mass arrests of Chinese nationals across Germany. The very few Chinese in German-occupied Poland were also victims of Nazi Germany, with 13 deported from Warsaw to the Gross-Rosen concentration camp in 1944. At the end of the war, the Chinese communities in cities such as Berlin, Hamburg, and Bremen that existed before the war were destroyed.

=== Division of Germany and the Cold War (1945–1990) ===
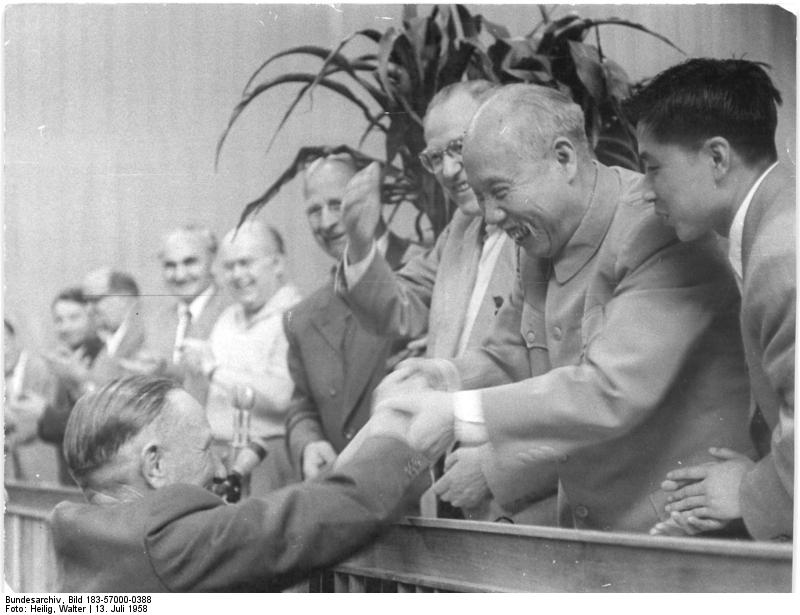
China's Dong Biwu (second from the right) with Otto Grotewohl (third from the right) and Walter Ulbricht (fourth from the right) in East Berlin (1958)

The Federal Republic of Germany or West Germany initially did not recognize the People's Republic of China primarily because of its hard-line anti-communist foreign policy of the Hallstein Doctrine. West Germany formally supported the One-China policy, in hopes of finding Chinese backing of the reunification of Germany. In October 1972, West Germany officially established diplomatic contacts with the PRC, although unofficial contacts had been in existence since 1964, three years after the beginning of the Sino-Soviet Split.

The German Democratic Republic or East Germany also managed to have good relations with the PRC, despite the Sino-Soviet Split that occurred for most of the Cold War until the 1989 Sino-Soviet Summit. Since the March 1982 speech on Sino-Soviet rapprochement by General Secretary Leonid Brezhnev to the Communist Party of Uzbekistan in Tashkent, Sino-East German relations began to steadily improve. In June 1986, Foreign Minister Wu Xueqian visited East Berlin in the highest-level Chinese delegation to Eastern Europe since the 1961 split. Moreover, Chairman Erich Honecker visited Beijing in early October 1986, where he was met by Chinese President Li Xiannian with in a welcoming ceremony on Tiananmen Square a military band and a marchpast by the People's Liberation Army honor guard. The visit became the first official visit by an Eastern Bloc leader to the PRC.

In 1989, the Chinese government's crackdown on student protests in Tiananmen Square led to West Germany imposing sanctions on China and reducing diplomatic ties to routine contacts. Relations improved in 1990, when the foreign secretaries of both countries met at the United Nations General Assembly in New York and agreed to restore diplomatic contact.

=== Reunified Germany (1990–present) ===
==== Early post-communism in united Germany ====
The frequent high-level diplomatic visits are acknowledged to have helped guarantee the smooth development of Sino-German relations. From 1993 to 1998, German and Chinese leaders met face-to-face 52 times: Among those Chinese leaders who visited Germany were Jiang Zemin, former General Secretary of the Chinese Communist Party; Qiao Shi, former Chairman of the Standing Committee of the National People's Congress (NPC); and Li Peng, former Premier of China and Chairman of the NPC Standing. Meanwhile, German leaders who visited China included President Roman Herzog, Chancellor Helmut Kohl, Foreign Minister Klaus Kinkel and Minister of State at the German Federal Foreign Office Ludger Volmer. Among these leaders, Chancellor Kohl visited China twice in 1993 and 1995. Since the new German government came into power in October 1998, Chancellor Gerhard Schröder has paid three visits to China. One after another from Germany came Vice Prime Minister and Foreign Minister Joschka Fischer, Defense Minister Rudolf Scharping, and Minister of Economics and Technology Werner Müller. At the same time, Germany welcomed Chinese Primer Zhu Rongji, Foreign Minister Tang Jiaxuan, State Councilor Wu Yi, member of the Political Bureau of the CCP Central Committee Wei Jianxing as well as member of the CCP Politburo Standing Committee Hu Jintao.

==== 2000s ====
Relations would continue to improve even more after 1998. For instance, Berlin and Peking (at that time yet called Peking), and fervently opposed the invasion of Iraq made by the United States in 2003, and in 2006 Germany (the largest economy and the most populous country of the European Union) and the Chinese Republic further enhanced their foreign political, economic and diplomatic relations and even ties within one of an EU-Sino strategic partnerships. For example, Germany and Republic of China also opposed direct military involvement of US in the 2011 Libyan civil war that had been made after the liberation of the accused Libean medical sisters and doctors, that were accused of crimes against children there, and liberated by the French President. Huawei, a major Chinese tech company, has collaborated with Porsche Design, a German design company in developing their Porsche Design Huawei Smartwatch GT 2

==== 2010s ====
Before the 2011 visit of China's PM Wen Jiabao, the Chinese government issued a "White Book on the accomplishments and perspective of Sino-German cooperation", the first of its kind for a European country. The visit also marked the first Sino-German government consultations, an exclusive mechanism for Sino-German communications. In 2018, Mercedes-Benz apologized to China for quoting the Dalai Lama on Instagram. In September 2019, China's ambassador to Germany stated that the meeting between Germany's foreign minister and Hong Kong activist Joshua Wong will damage relations with China.

==== 2020s ====
On 22 April 2020, Germany's Interior Ministry released a letter revealing that Chinese diplomats had contacted German Government officials "to encourage them" "to make positive statements on how China was handling the coronavirus pandemic". The German government did not comply with these requests. In December 2020, with Germany ending its two-year term on the United Nations Security Council, Chinese Ambassador Geng Shuang responded "Out of the bottom of my heart: good riddance" in response to the German Ambassador Christoph Heusgen's appeal to free two Canadians Michael Kovrig and Michael Spavor detained in China.

In October 2021, a tweet from the Global Times called for a "final solution to the Taiwan question" which was condemned by German politician Frank Müller-Rosentritt for its similarity to the “final solution to the Jewish question” which resulted in the Holocaust. In December 2021, as a result of a diplomatic spat between Lithuania and China over Taiwan and human rights China pressured Continental AG and other German companies to stop doing business with Lithuania. The Bundesverband der Deutschen Industrie described the expansion of the ban on importing Lithuanian goods to components in integrated supply chains as a "devastating own goal." The German government approved a quarter ownership for China shipper, COSCO, in the Hamburg container terminal port in May 2023. 2023 also brought the Federal Government Strategy on China, which laid out the German government's stance on China.

In September 2023, German Foreign Minister Annalena Baerbock named CCP General Secretary Xi Jinping a dictator next to Vladimir Putin. In April 2024, German authorities arrested three German nationals for spying for China and arranging illicit military technology transfers. The same month, authorities arrested a suspected spy, Jian Guo, working for Maximilian Krah. The spy was later sentenced to four years in prison. In July 2024, Germany blocked the sale of a gas turbine business to a subsidiary of China State Shipbuilding Corporation for national security reasons. The same month, the German government announced a deal with telecommunication companies in the country to remove Chinese 5G equipment by 2029.

In July 2024, Germany summoned the Chinese ambassador over a 2021 cyber-attack against the Federal Agency for Cartography and Geodesy attributed to "Chinese state actors" for the "purpose of espionage." In August 2024, Germany's IT sector trade association reported that 45% of German businesses had suffered cyberattacks or industrial espionage traced to China. In October 2024, a Chinese woman was arrested in Leipzig on suspicion passing information on arms deliveries to Chinese intelligence. In November 2024, German authorities investigated a Chinese shipping vessel, the Yi Peng 3, in the Baltic Sea after it was found be in the vicinity of two severed undersea fiber-optic data cables and suspected of sabotage.

In January 2025, German prosecutors indicted three German nationals for illegally obtaining information on military technology for the Ministry of State Security (MSS). In July 2025, Germany's Foreign Office summoned China's ambassador to Germany after a PLAN warship targeted a German aircraft, a specially configured Beechcraft King Air 350 that was flying towards Djibouti, with a laser during Operation Aspides in the Red Sea. According to Der Spiegel, the aircraft aborted its mission and returned to Djibouti after being laser-targeted by a Chinese PLAN frigate. A German Foreign Ministry spokesperson stated the ship had been seen in the area before and “laser-targeted the aircraft with no reason or prior communication during a routine mission flight.” The PLAN ship accused of carrying out the laser attack was believed to be from the three-ship PLAN 47th Chinese Naval Escort Taskforce, comprising destroyer CNS Baotou (133), frigate CNS Honghe (523) and fleet oiler CNS Gaoyouhu (904).

In November 2025, German Vice Chancellor Lars Klingbeil visited China as part of the biannual financial dialogue talks between the two countries. During the visit, he met with Vice Premier He Lifeng and Wang Huning, the chairman of the National Committee of the Chinese People's Political Consultative Conference. He also met with Liu Haixing, the head of the International Department of the Chinese Communist Party, in his capacity as the co-leader of the Social Democratic Party as part of the party dialogue between the SPD and the CCP established in 1984. In July 2026, Germany requested talks with the Chinese ambassador following reports of covert Chinese training of Russian military forces for its war against Ukraine.

== Espionage ==
According to reporting in Süddeutsche Zeitung, China has been soliciting information from members of the Bundestag, including offering €30,000 for insider information from one parliamentarian.

Between August and September 2007 Chinese hackers were suspected of using Trojan horse spyware on various government computers, including those of the Chancellory, the Ministry of Economics and Technology, and the Ministry of Education and Research. Germans officials believe Trojan viruses were inserted in Microsoft Word and PowerPoint files, and approximately 160 gigabytes of data were siphoned to Guangzhou, Lanzhou and Beijing via South Korea, on instructions from the People's Liberation Army.

The Federal Ministry of the Interior estimates that Chinese economic espionage could be costing Germany between 20 and 50 billion euros annually. Spies are reportedly targeting mid- and small-scale companies that do not have as strong security regimens as larger corporations. Berthold Stoppelkamp, head of the Working Group for Economic Security (ASW), stated that German companies had a poor security culture making espionage easier, exacerbated by the absence of a "strong, centralized" police command. Walter Opfermann, a counter-intelligence expert for the state of Baden-Württemberg, claimed that China is using extremely sophisticated electronic attacks capable of endangering portions of critical German infrastructure, having gathered sensitive information through techniques such as phone hacking and Trojan emails. In November 2018, German prosecutors in Cologne charged a former employee of Lanxess for engaging in industrial espionage on behalf of a Chinese copycat company.

Germany suspects China of spying both on German corporations and on Uyghur expatriates living in the country. In 2011, a 64-year-old German man was charged with spying on Uyghurs in Munich between April 2008 and October 2009. Munich is a center for expatriate Uyghurs, and in November 2009 members of the Federal Criminal Police Office arrested four Chinese nationals on charges of spying on Uyghurs. In 2007 Chinese diplomat Ji Wumin left Germany after being observed meeting with individuals engaged in surveillance of Munich Uyghurs, and German investigators suspect China is coordinating espionage activities out of its Munich consulate in the Neuhausen district.

In 2012, EADS (Airbus) and steel maker ThyssenKrupp were attacked by Chinese hackers. ThyssenKrupp described the attack as "massive" and "especially qualitative".

In 2016, ThyssenKrupp underwent an "organized, highly professional hacking attack" conducted "with state backing and the best attack techniques" whose aim was "to steal technological know-how and research". The group stated to have successfully repealed the attack after a "6 months long defensive battle". Some information was obtained by the hackers but critical divisions concerning blast furnace, power stations and submarines have reportedly not been affected. The timing of the attacks suggest that attackers are based in China or southeast Asia.

In 2017, the Federal Office for the Protection of the Constitution (BfV) published information alleging that Chinese intelligence services had created fake social media profiles on sites such as LinkedIn, using them to gather information on German politicians and government officials. The Verfassungsschutz had previously warned that Chinese intelligence officers are making use of social networking sites such as LinkedIn and XING to recruit informants. Lu Kang of the Ministry of Foreign Affairs denied the allegations.

In 2019, an investigation led by the Bayerischer Rundfunk uncovered that a hacker group called Winnti had attacked twelve major companies including six German DAX-traded companies: Bayer AG, BASF, Siemens, Henkel, Covestro. The Kapersky Lab first uncovered Winnti in 2011 after it infected the German company Gameforge and has been highly active ever since. An IT security expert with whom they have worked said that "any DAX corporation that hasn't been attacked by Winnti must have done something wrong". This group has also been attributed the responsibility of the 2016 ThyssenKrupp hacking attack.

We can, based on many, many indicators, say with high confidence that Winnti is being directed by the Chinese [government].

— Dror-John Röcher (German Cyber Security Organization [DCSO])

In October 2024, Germany arrests Chinese woman Yaqi X for passing defense info to China via EU lawmaker Maximilian Krah’s Chinese aide Jian Guo.

In January 2025, German prosecutors indicted three individuals suspected of spying for China by gathering information on military technology for China's Ministry of State Security. The German Federal Criminal Police Office (BKA) arrested Herwig F., Ina F. and Thomas R., in Düsseldorf and Bad Homburg in April 2024.

In April 2025, a Chinese man, Jian Guo, who worked for a prominent German far-right lawmaker Maximilian Krah in the European Parliament was charged with spying for China for more than four years.

In May 2026, German police arrested a married couple named Xuejun C. and Hua S. in Munich accused of spying for China by collecting sensitive information on aerospace, AI, and other technologies with possible military use. Prosecutors said the pair built contacts with German researchers and universities on behalf of Chinese intelligence.

In October 2026, Germany's former intelligence chief August Hanning was arrested on suspicion of espionage, with Der Spiegel reporting his longstanding contacts with former Chinese major general Wang Jianzheng. Hanning was suspected of sharing confidential information with foreign intelligence agents after retiring in 2005 and becoming an independent security consultant.

== Political relations ==
Germany follows the One-China policy. According to its national strategy, Germany "has close and good relations with Taiwan in many areas and wants to expand them. As part of the EU's One-China policy, we support issue-specific involvement on the part of democratic Taiwan in international organisations. The status quo of the Taiwan Strait may only be changed by peaceful means and mutual consent". According to Foreign Minister Frank-Walter Steinmeier in 2008, Germany considers Taiwan to be a part of China.

In July 2019, the UN ambassadors from 22 nations, including Germany, signed a joint letter to the United Nations Human Rights Council condemning China's persecution of the Uyghurs as well as its mistreatment of other minority groups, urging the CCP General Secretary Xi Jinping's government to close the Xinjiang re-education camps. In 2019, Volkswagen Group came under pressure for cooperating with the Chinese government in the region of Xinjiang. In June 2020, Germany opposed the Hong Kong national security law. On 6 October 2020, Germany's ambassador to the UN, on behalf of the group of 39 countries including Germany, the U.K. and the U.S., made a statement to denounce China for its treatment of ethnic minorities and for curtailing freedoms in Hong Kong.

== Economic relations ==
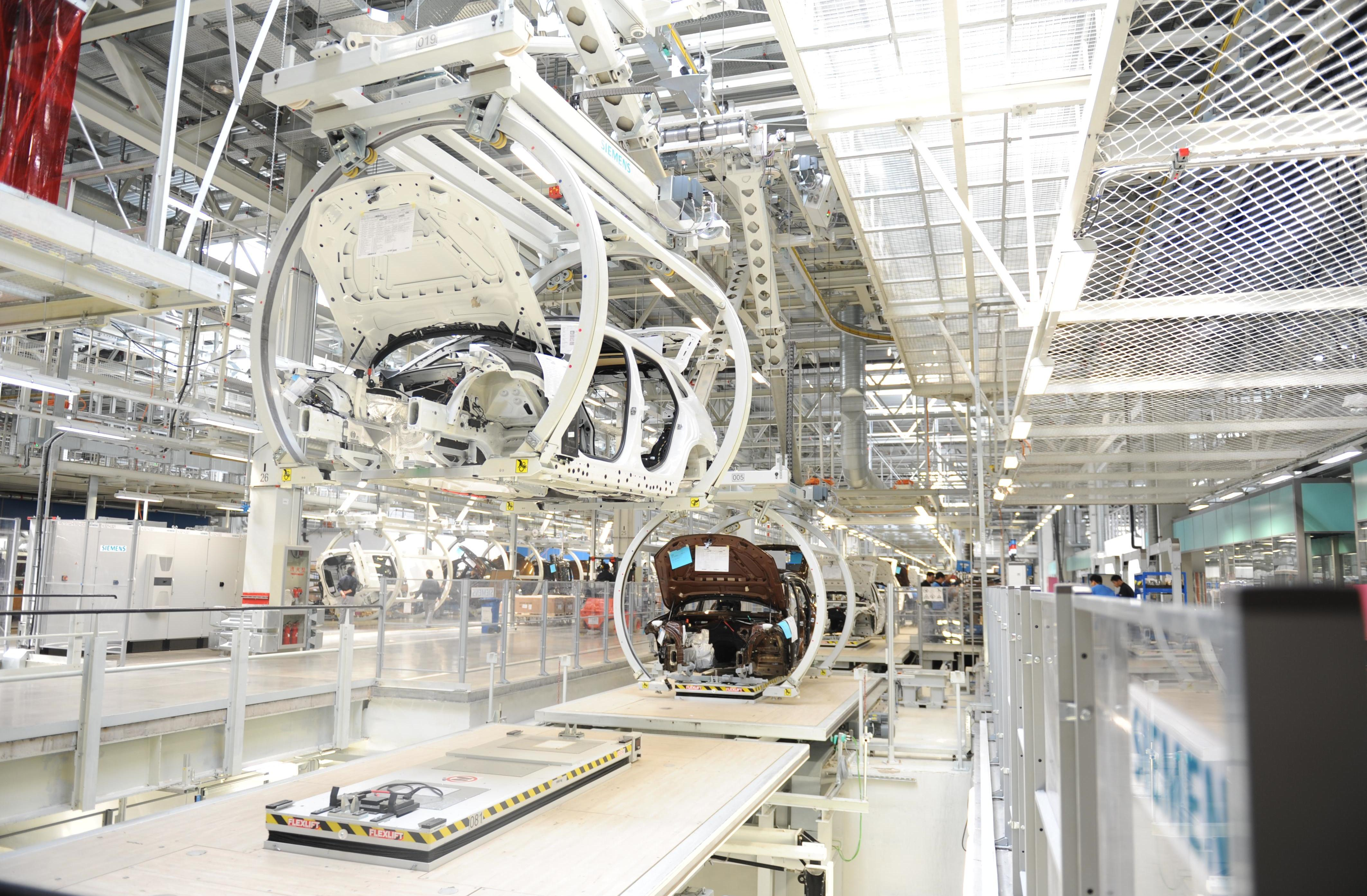
BMW assembly factory in Tiexi, Shenyang

Chinese markets are important for German industry, particularly the German automotive industry. Germany is China's biggest trading partner and technology exporter in Europe. During much of the 2000s and 2010s, China and Germany had highly complementary economies, with Germany supplying industrial machinery to China. This changed during the 2020s, when Chinese manufacturers grew increasingly advanced, leading them to be direct competitors to German companies as well as China to be less dependent on German industrial products overall. The sales of German automotive brands in China have declined rapidly in the 2020s due to the increasing competitiveness of Chinese brands and the quick adoption of electric vehicle technology. From 2020 to 2025, German carmakers have seen their market share in China decline from 24 percent to 12 percent. In 2025, for the first time, Germany imported more capital goods from China than it exported.

The trade volume between China and Germany surpassed 100 billion U.S. dollars in 2008. By 2014, German Chancellor Angela Merkel had visited China on trade missions seven times since assuming office in 2005; this underlines the importance of China to the German economy. In February 2024, Volkswagen Group and Chinese electric vehicle manufacturer XPeng signed a technology cooperation and joint development agreement on platform and software.

== Public opinion ==
A survey published in 2026 by the Pew Research Center found that 33% of Germans had a favorable view of China, while 64% had an unfavorable view.

== Resident diplomatic missions ==
- China has an embassy in Berlin and consulates-general in Düsseldorf, Frankfurt, Hamburg and Munich.
- Germany has an embassy in Beijing and consulates-general in Chengdu, Guangzhou, Hong Kong, Shanghai and Shenyang.
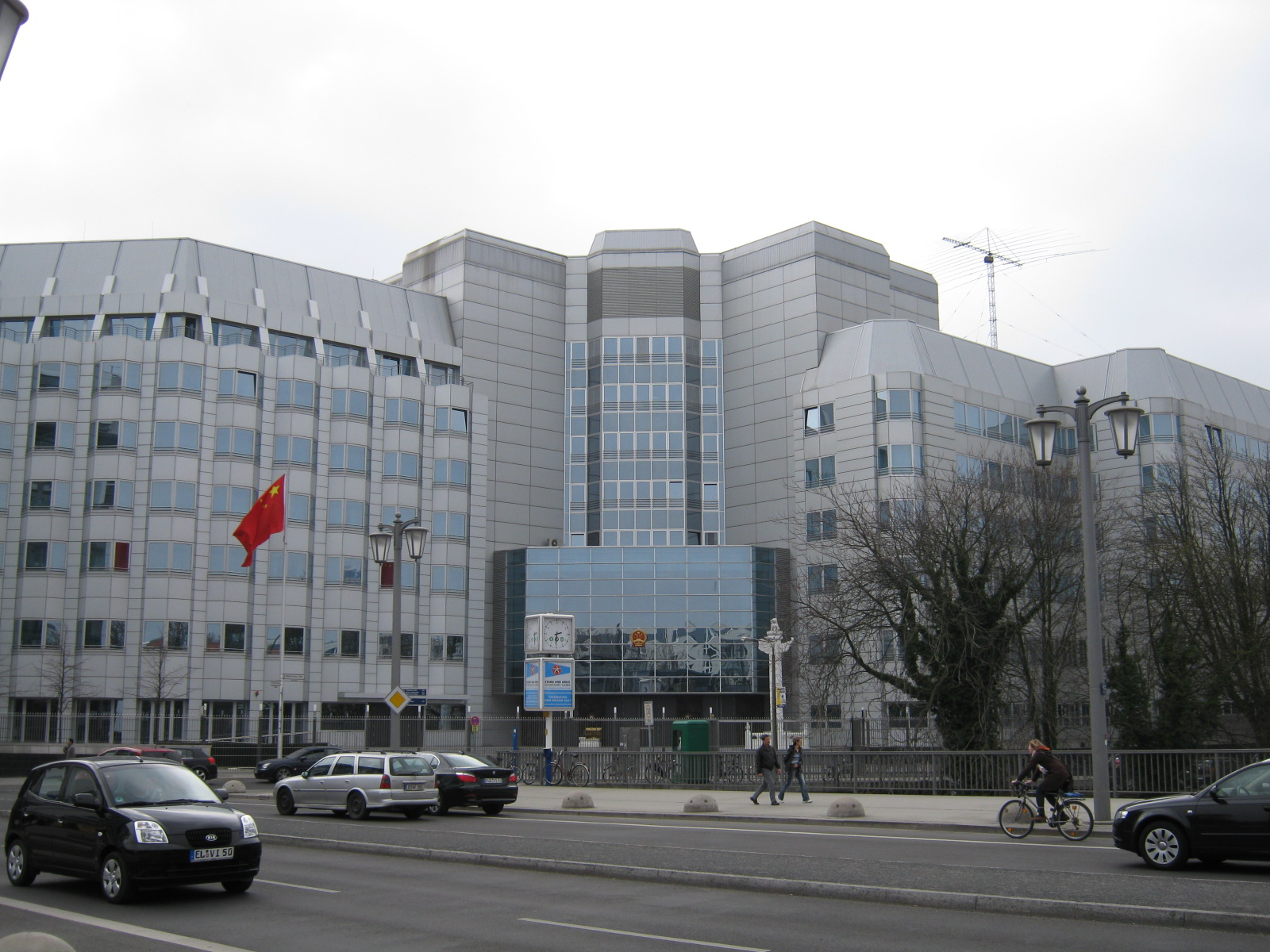
Embassy of China in Berlin

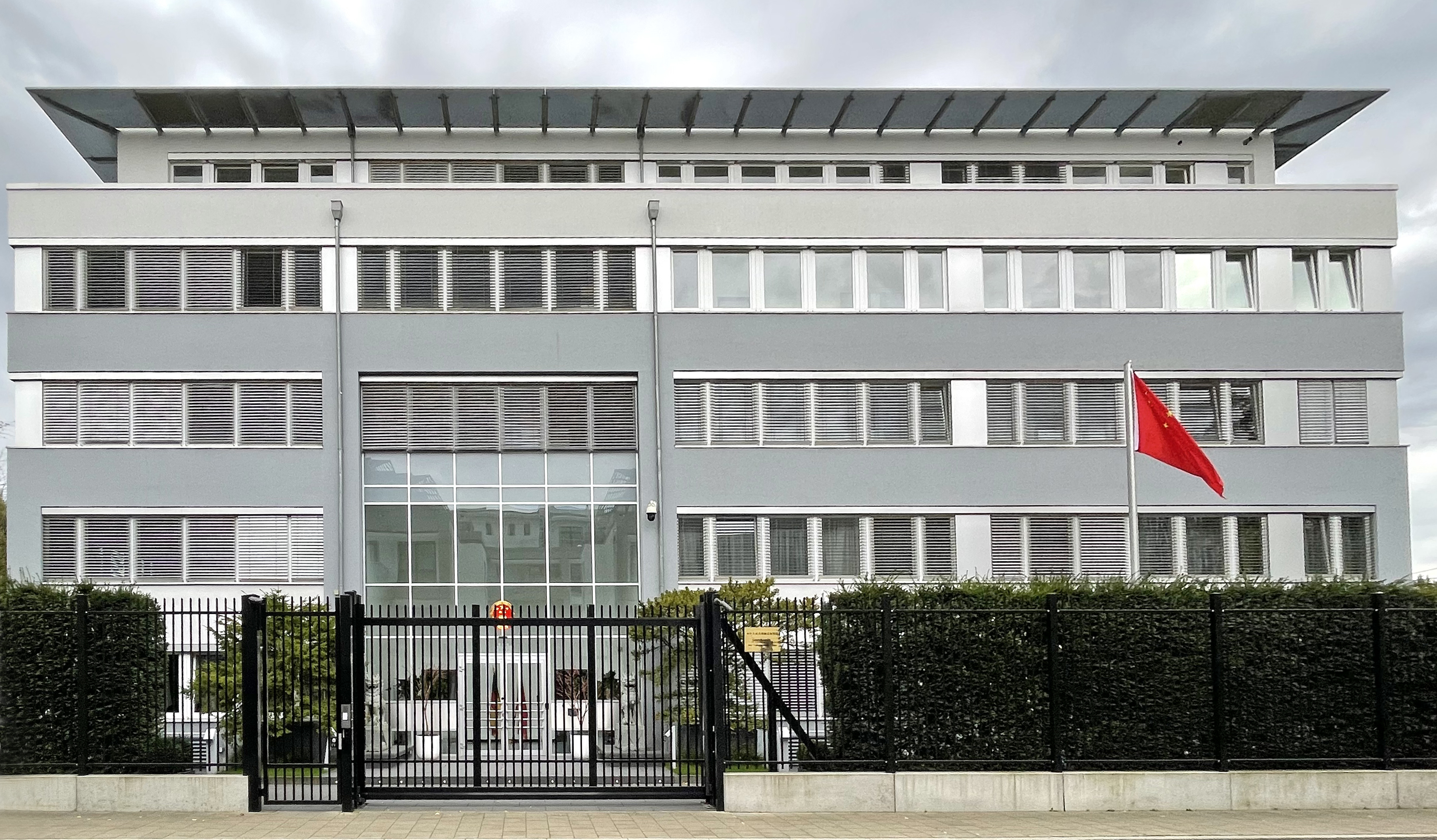
Consulate-General of China in Düsseldorf

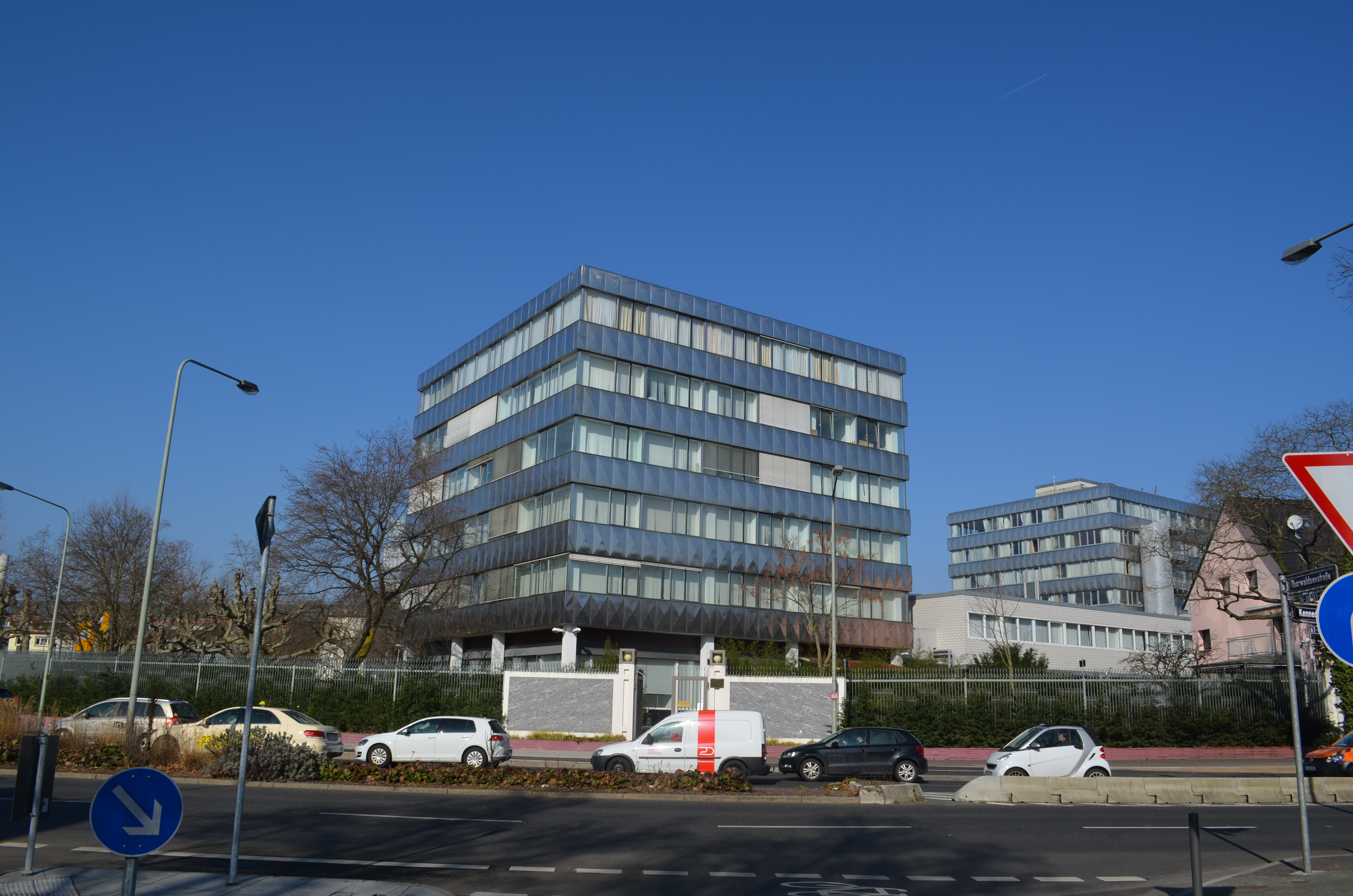
Consulate-General of China in Frankfurt

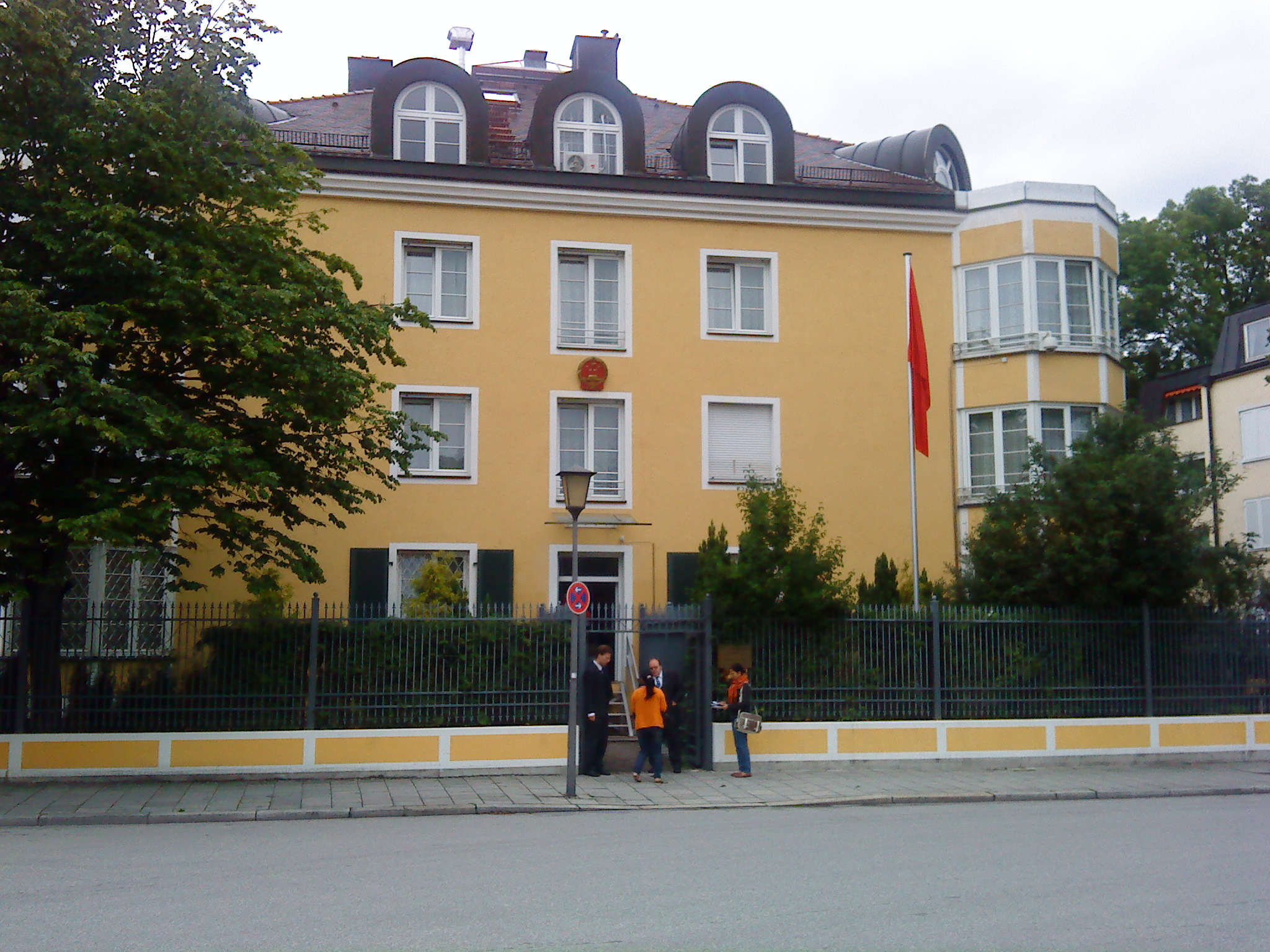
Consulate-General of China in Munich
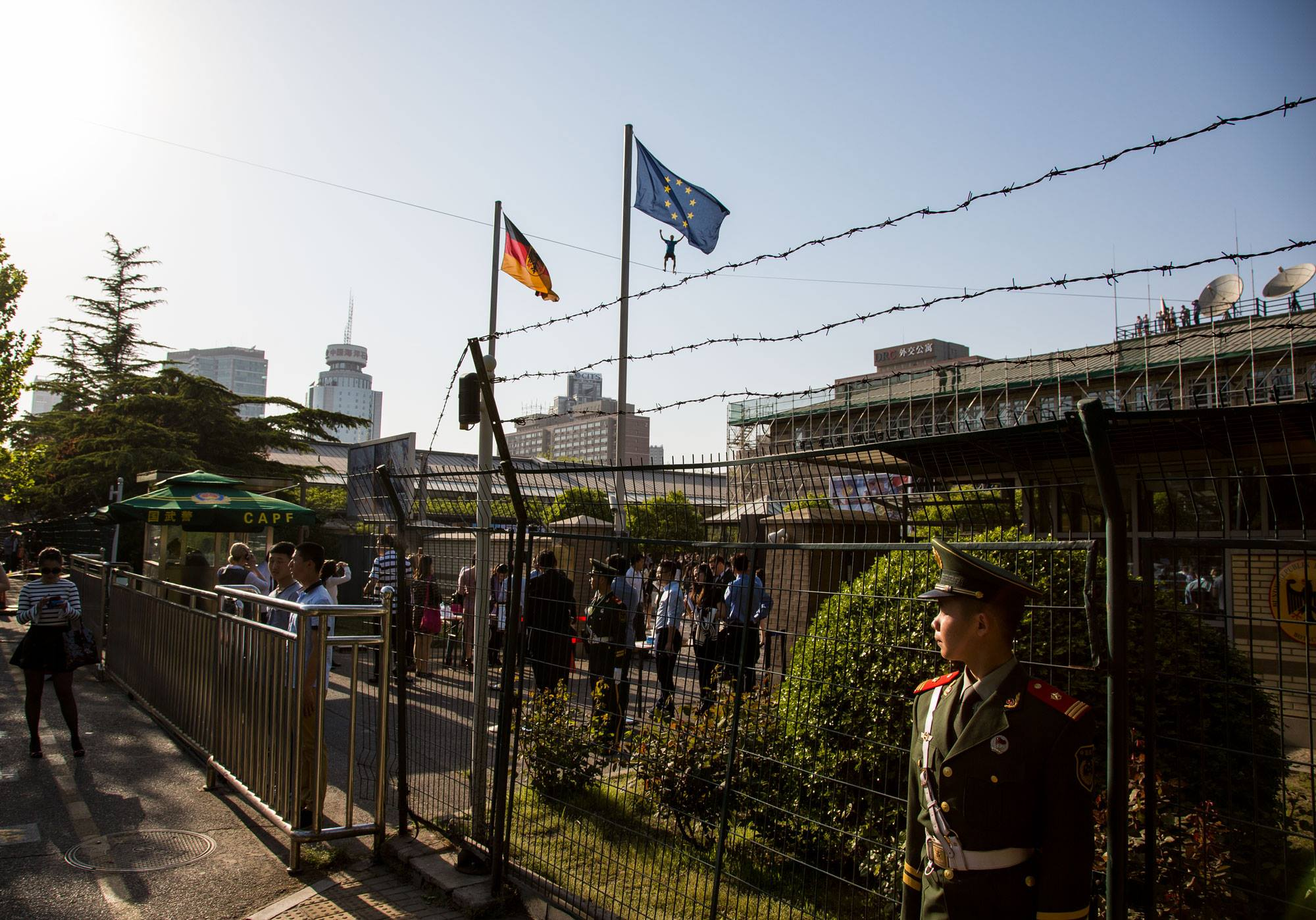
Embassy of Germany in Beijing

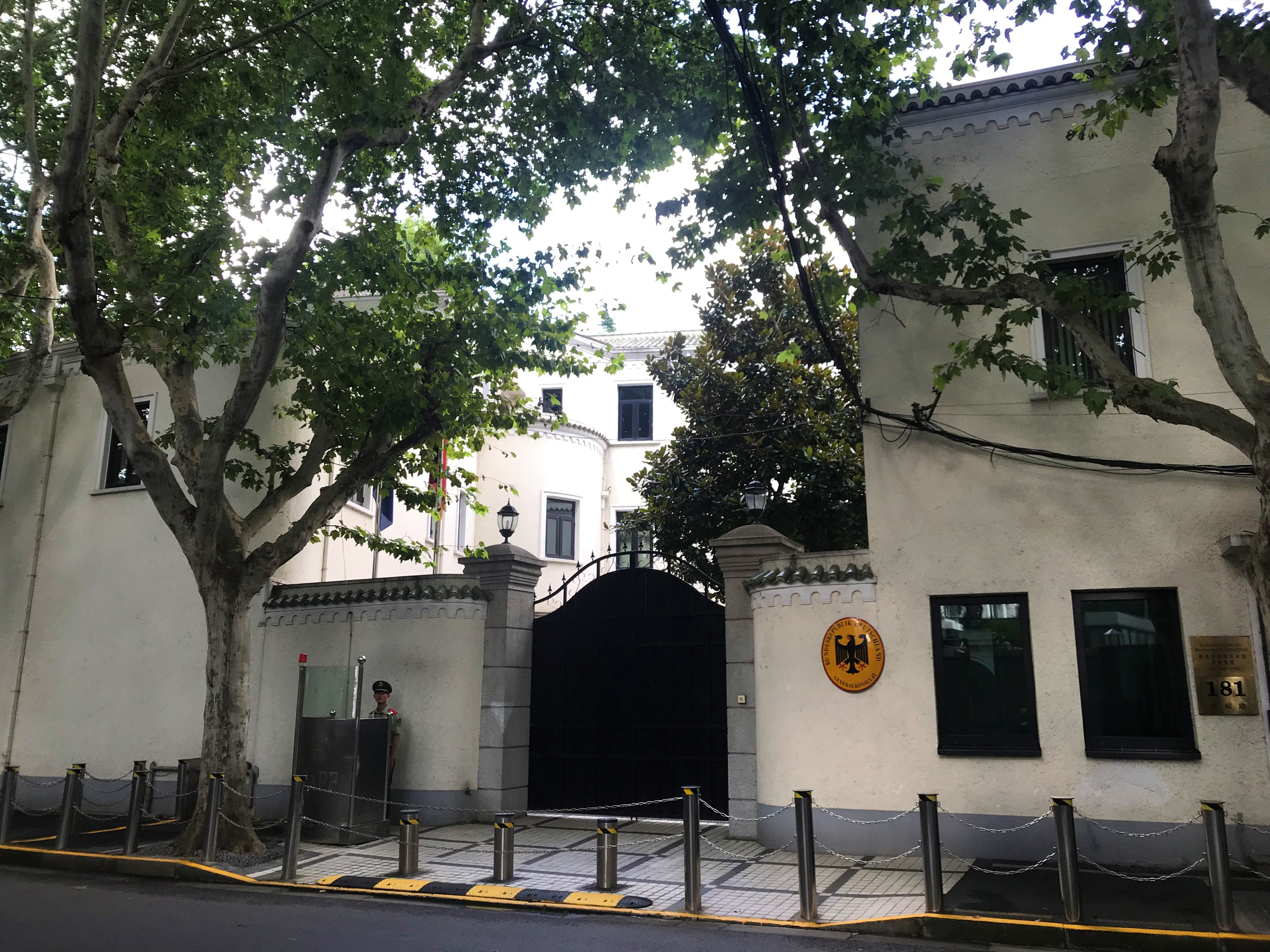
Consulate-General of Germany in Shanghai

== See also ==
- Yellow Peril
- Boxer Rebellion, 1899–1901
- Kiautschou Bay Leased Territory
- China–European Union relations
- Chinese people in Germany
- East Asia Squadron, German naval operations based in China to 1914
- List of ambassadors of China to Germany
- List of ambassadors of Germany to China
