= Detlef Müller (politician) =

German politician

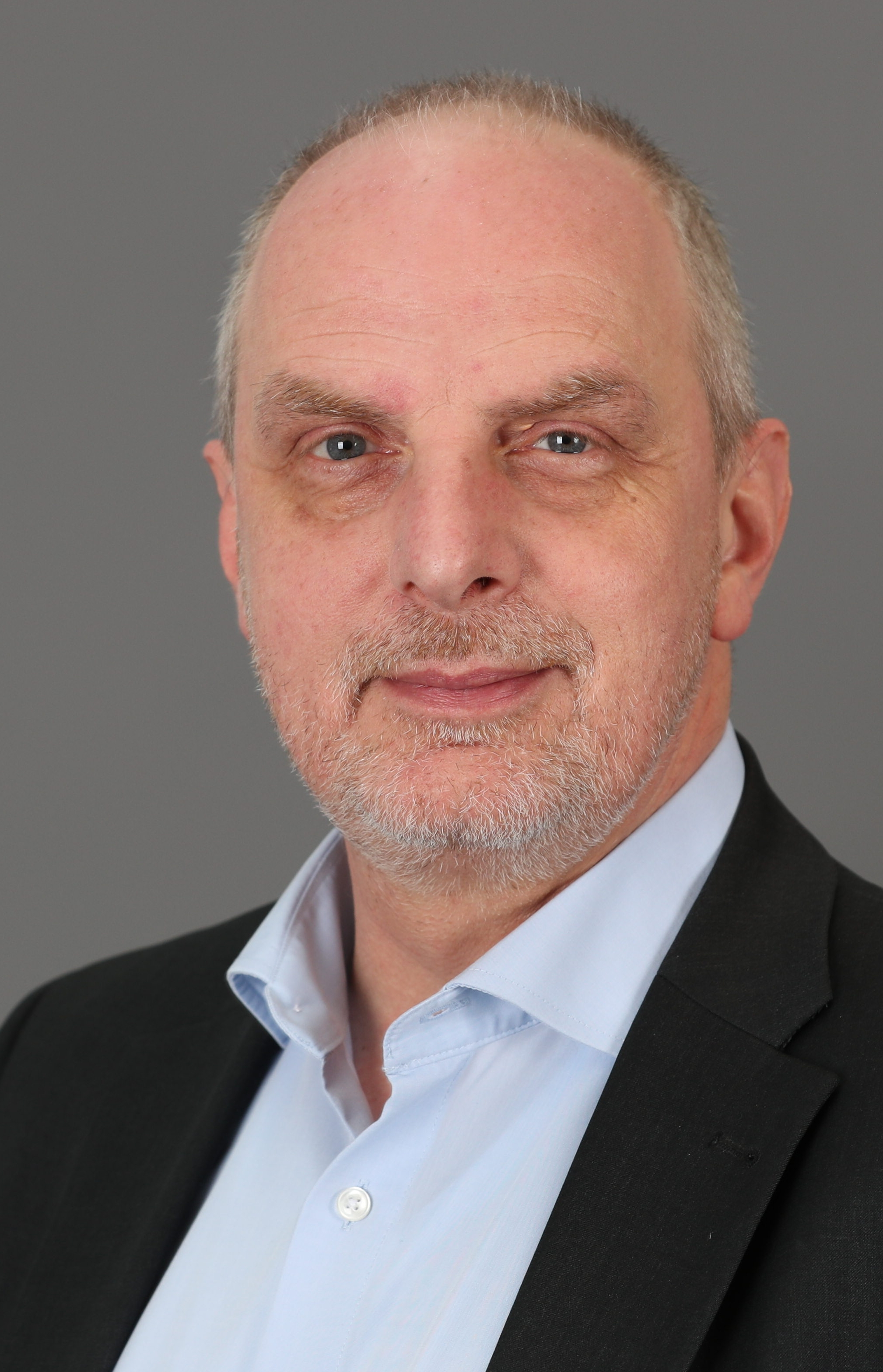
- Detlef Müller in 2020

Member of the Bundestag
- In office 22 September 2013 – 26 September 2021
- Preceded by: Wolfgang Tiefensee
- Constituency: Social Democratic List; (State-Saxony)
- In office 18 October 2005 – 27 October 2009
- Preceded by: Jelena Hoffmann
- Succeeded by: Frank Heinrich
- Constituency: Chemnitz

Member of the Bundestag
- In office 26 September 2021 – 2025
- Preceded by: Frank Heinrich
- Constituency: Chemnitz

Personal details
- Born: 20 August 1964 (age 62) Chemnitz, East Germany (now Germany)
- Party: SPD

Detlef Müller (born 20 August 1964) is a German train driver and politician of the Social Democratic Party (SPD) who has served as a member of the Bundestag from the state of Saxony from 2005 till 2009 and from 2014 to 2025, representing the Chemnitz district.

== Political career ==
Müller first became a member of the Bundestag in 2014. He is a member of the Committee on Transport and Digital Infrastructure.

Since 2021, Müller has been serving as one his parliamentary group's deputy chairs, under the leadership of chairman Rolf Mützenich.

In February 2025, he lost his seat in Bundestag.

== Other activities ==
- Business Forum of the Social Democratic Party of Germany, Member of the Political Advisory Board
- Arbitration Body of the Public Transport (SÖP), Member of the Advisory Board
- Smart Rail Connectivity Campus, Member of the Advisory Board
- Railway and Transport Union (EVG), Member
