= Thomas Jung (politician) =

German lawyer and politician (1957–2022)

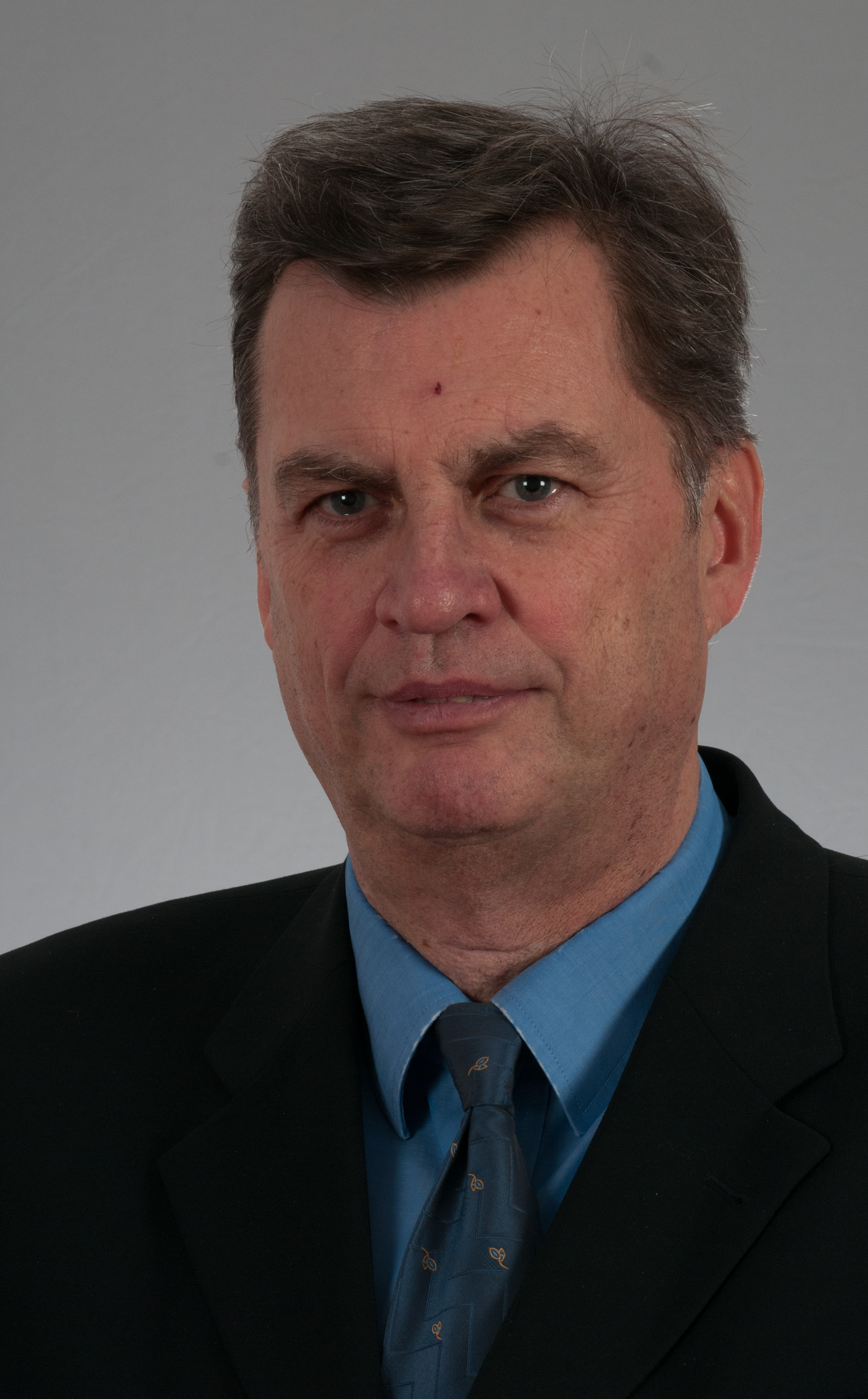
- Jung in 2019

Member of the Landtag of Brandenburg
- In office 8 October 2014 – 25 September 2019

Personal details
- Born: 1 November 1957 Idar-Oberstein, Rhineland-Palatinate, West Germany
- Died: September 2022 (aged 64)
- Party: AfD
- Education: Free University of Berlin; University of Vienna; University of Erlangen–Nuremberg; University of Hagen
- Occupation: Lawyer

Thomas Jung (1 November 1957 – September 2022) was a German politician. A member of Alternative for Germany, he served in the Landtag of Brandenburg from 2014 to 2019.

He supported the Election Alternative in 2013 and joined the AfD. He was an assessor on the state executive committee of the AfD Brandenburg and became a member of the state expert committees Interior and Justice, BER and Budget and Finance, as well as the program commission. He was spokesman for the state specialist committees Freedom and Justice in Security and Germany, Euro and Europe and chairman of the AfD district association Potsdam.

Jung died in September 2022, at the age of 64.
