= Orbis Verlag =

German publishing company

Orbis Verlag was a Gütersloh-based publisher. The publishing company was later acquired by Bertelsmann.
