= Märkische Allgemeine =

German daily newspaper

- Type: Daily newspaper
- Format: Broadsheet
- Owner: Madsack Group
- Publisher: Märkische Verlags- und Druckgesellschaft mbH Potsdam
- Editor-in-chief: Klaus Rost
- Founded: 18 April 1946
- Language: German
- Headquarters: Märkische Allgemeine, Friedrich-Engels-Straße 24, D-14473 Potsdam
- Circulation: 136,392
- Website: maerkischeallgemeine.de

The Märkische Allgemeine (MAZ) is a regional, daily newspaper published by the Märkische Verlags- und Druckgesellschaft mbH for the area in and around the state capital of Brandenburg, Potsdam in Germany.

The newspaper was created in 1946 by the merger of Volkswille and Der Märker and took on its current name on German Unity Day, 3 October 1990.
