= Petra Zais =

German politician (1957–2021)

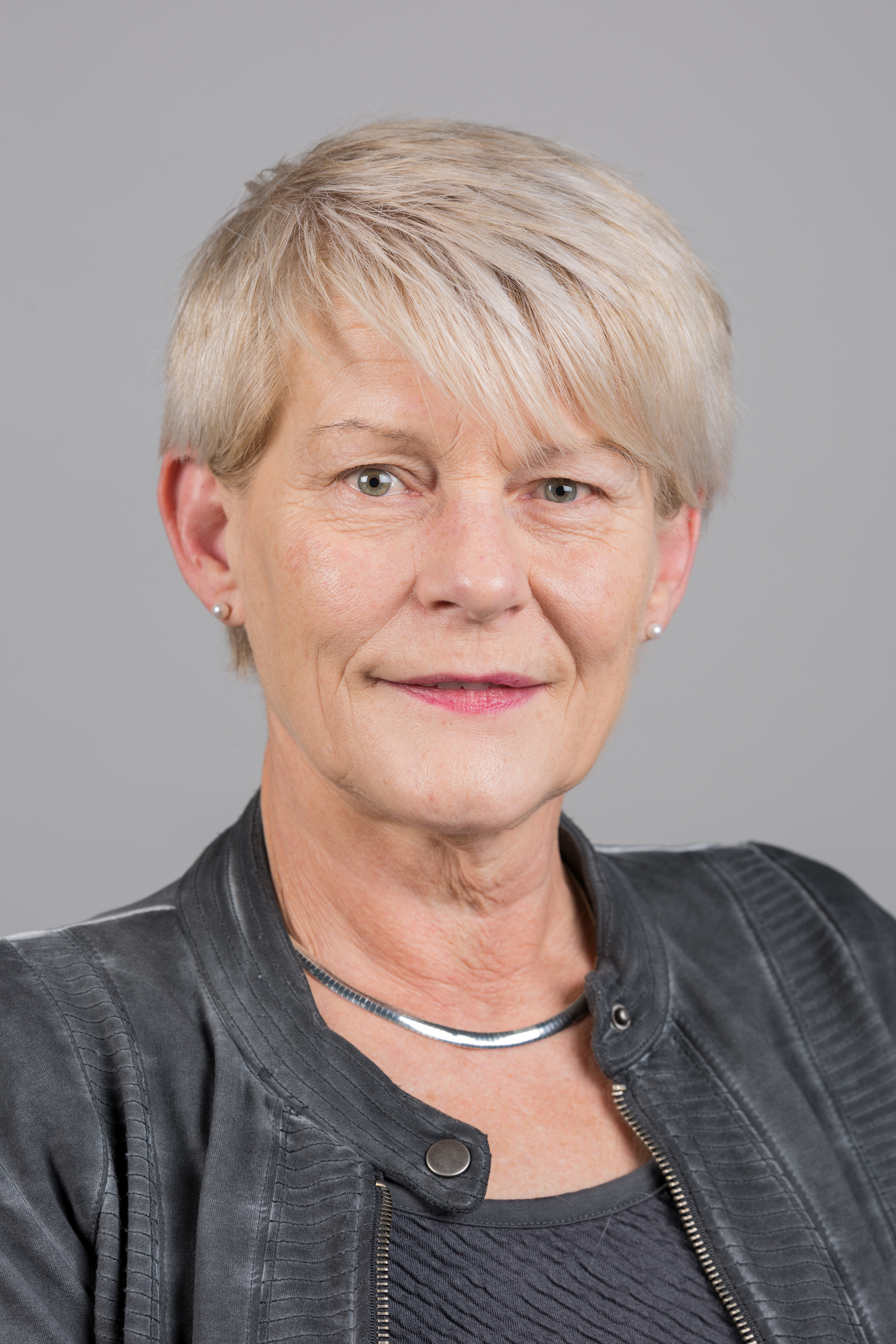
- Zais in 2016

Member of the Landtag of Saxony
- In office 2014–2019

Member of the Stadtrat of Chemnitz
- In office 1992–1999
- In office 2009–2014

Personal details
- Born: 22 March 1957 Breitenbrunn, East Germany
- Died: 7 October 2021 (aged 64)
- Party: PDS; Alliance 90/The Greens

Petra Zais (22 March 1957 – 7 October 2021) was a German politician.

== Biography ==
Zais graduated from secondary school in 1975 and subsequently worked as an apprentice papermaker in Antonsthal until 1980. After the Peaceful Revolution, she worked as a kindergarten teacher and attended the Euro-Schulen-Organisation from 1991 to 1993. She served as mobile consultant at Kulturbüro Sachsen from 2001 to 2010.

Zais died on 7 October 2021, at the age of 64.

=== Political activities ===
Zais was a member of the Socialist Unity Party of Germany from 1977 to 1990. She was active in her support for the communist regime of East Germany during that time. She then served on the Stadtrat of Chemnitz from 1992 to 1999, initially for the Party of Democratic Socialism and then for Alliance 90/The Greens. She rejoined the Stadtrat in 2009, becoming managing director of the Alliance 90/The Greens group from 2010 to 2014. In 2001, she unsuccessfully ran for mayor of Chemnitz. In 2009 and 2013, she unsuccessfully ran for a seat in the Bundestag. In 2014, she was elected to the Landtag of Saxony for the Greens. In the Landtag, she served on the Committee for School and Sport and was spokeswoman for Alliance 90/The Greens for education, labor market policy, sport and asylum and migration. She did not run for re-election in 2019.
