= Michael Leutert =

United Nations official

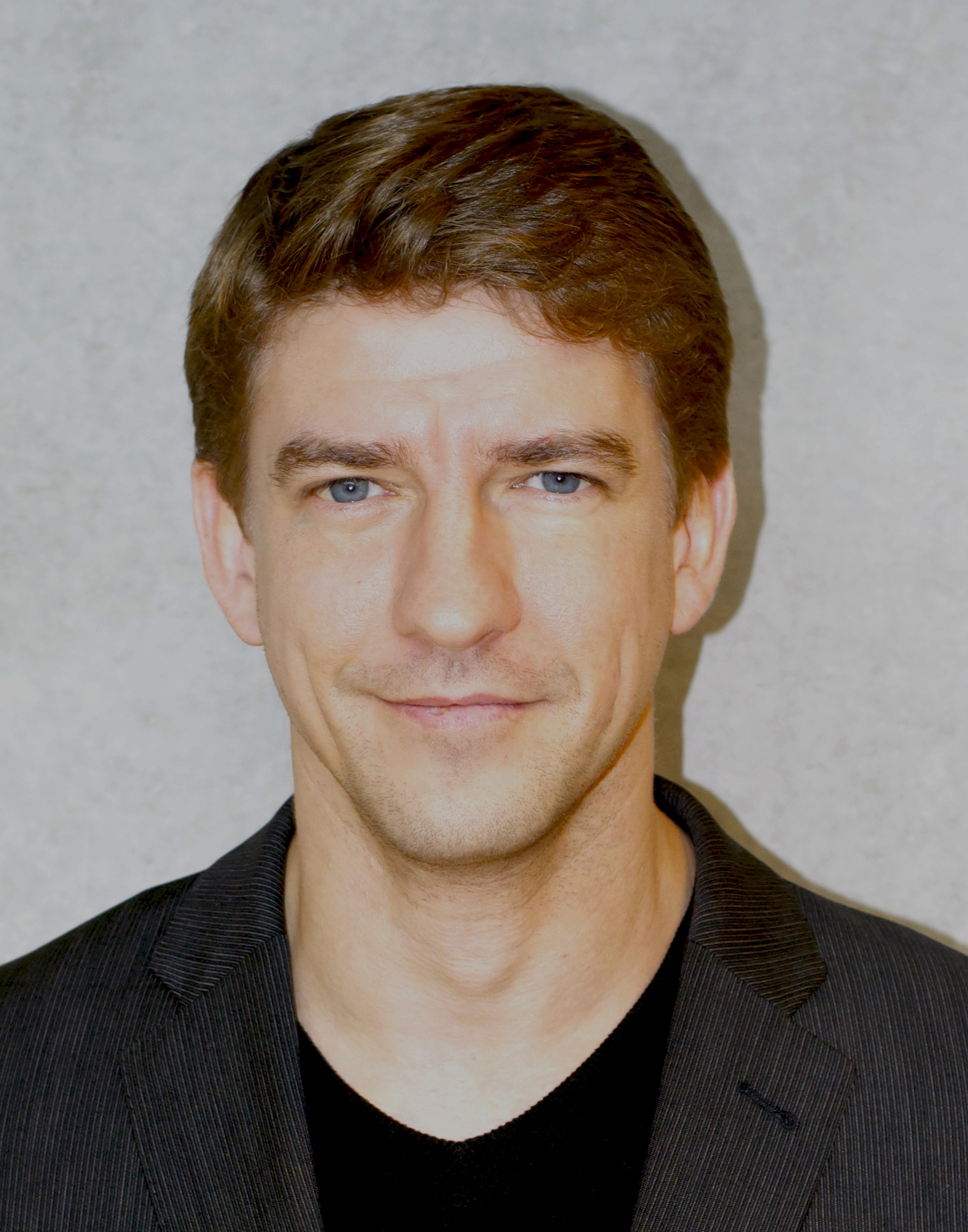
- Michael Leutert in 2012

Director of United Nations Development Programme
- Incumbent
- Assumed office 2021

Personal details
- Born: 8 August 1974 (age 51) Bad Schlema, East Germany (now Germany)
- Children: 4

Michael Leutert (born 8 August 1974) is a senior United Nations official, German politician (Die Linke) and graduate sociologist. Since 2021, he has been Director of the German Representative Office of UNDP. He was a member of the German Bundestag from 2005 to 2021.

== Life ==
After graduating from high school in Mittweida in 1993, Leutert studied sociology, political science and law at the Technical University of Chemnitz and the Technical University of Dresden, graduating as a sociologist in 2002.

Leutert is married, father of four children and lives in Berlin.

== Political career ==
In 2005, Michael Leutert became a Member of the German Bundestag for the first time. His constituency was Chemnitz. He received his mandate via the state list of the Saxon Left Party (Die Linke). He had been a member of the Budget Committee since 2005 and a member of the Audit Committee. From 2005 to 2009, he was also the chairman of the Left Party in the Committee on Human Rights and Humanitarian Aid and the human rights policy spokesman of his parliamentary group. In the 18th legislative period, he was chairman of the German-Mexican Parliamentary Group. He was also a member of the supervisory board of the German Corporation for International Cooperation (GIZ).

After announcing that he would not run in the 2021 Bundestag election, he gave up his mandate as a member of the Bundestag on February 14, 2021 for a change in professional career. Axel Troost followed as his successor.

Since April 2021, Leutert is the director of the German Representation Office of the United Nations Development Programme (UNDP).
