= Frank Heinrich =

German politician

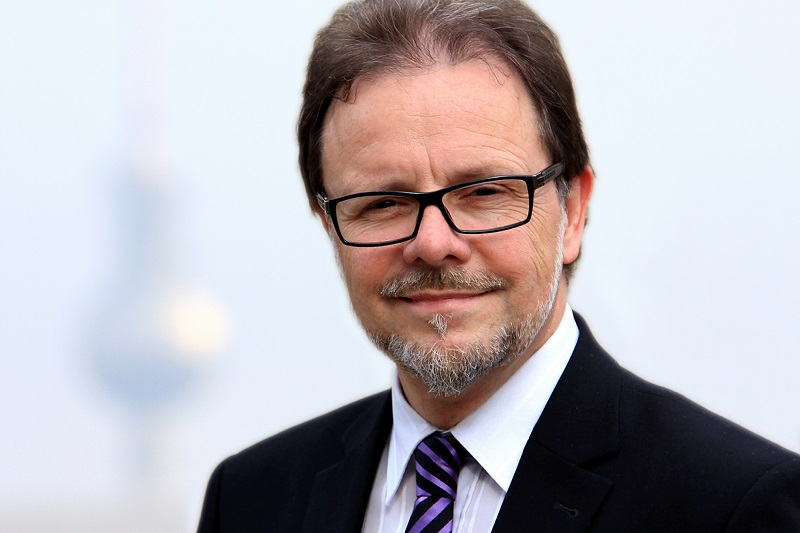

Member of the Bundestag
- In office 2009–2021

Personal details
- Born: 25 January 1964 (age 62) Siegen, West Germany (now Germany)
- Citizenship: German
- Party: CDU

Frank Heinrich (born 25 January 1964) is a German theologian, social pedagogue and politician of the Christian Democratic Union (CDU).

== Background and education ==
Heinrich was born in Siegen. At the age of three he moved to the southern part of Germany together with his family where his parents managed a retirement home. After a civil service he spent a year abroad in Canada as a divinity student. When he returned he finished his studies of social education and became a member of the Salvation Army in Freiburg im Breisgau. Until 1995 he was head of the social missionary service (Die Insel and Die Spinnwebe) as social worker. In 1997, Heinrich was fully ordained as a Salvation Army Officer. Together with his wife he was leading the Salvation Army in Chemnitz between 1997 and 2009. Frank Heinrich is married since 1987 and father of four children.

== Political career ==
Heinrich became a member of the Christian Democratic Union (CDU) in 2007. In the parliamentary elections in the years 2009, 2013 and 2017 he secured the direct mandate for the constituency Chemnitz. Since November 2009 Frank Heinrich has been chairman of the CDU county chapter in Chemnitz. In parliament, he served a member of the CDU/CSU parliamentary group and the group's deputy speaker on the Committee on Human Rights and Humanitarian Aid. Furthermore he was a member of the Committee on Labour and Social Affairs.

In addition to his committee assignments, Heinrich served as deputy chairman of the Parliamentary Friendship Group for Relations with the SADC States.

On 13 March 2021, Heinrich ran against Sebastian Liebold and Nora Seitz for the nomination for the Bundestag election of the CDU in Chemnitz. In the run-off, party members voted 70 to 49 in favor of him. In the 2021 federal election, he lost his direct mandate in third place after the SPD and AfD candidates.

From 2023 on till March 2025 Heinrich was along Reinhardt Schink co-chairmen of Evangelical Aliance in Germany.

== Other activities ==
- Evangelical Church in Germany (EKD), Member of the Committee on Sustainable Development
- Freiheit für die Westsahara e.V., Member of the Board of Trustees
- International Youth Meeting Center in Oświęcim/Auschwitz, Member of the Board of Trustees
- Iman Foundation, Member of the Advisory Board
- Stiftung für Grundwerte und Völkerverständigung, Member of the Board of Trustees

== Political positions ==
Heinrich's political work focusses on his constituency Chemnitz with an emphasis on economic cooperation with Africa, infrastructure, social equality, families, children’s rights and Chemnitz as a location for research and scientific development. Moreover his working spectrum includes Africa, religious freedom and development cooperation at eye level. For establishing economic collaborations between Chemnitz and African countries, Heinrich and the Chamber of industry and commerce Chemnitz initiated the network conference “Business trifft Afrika” (“Business meets Africa”). Starting in 2014 it became an annual event.

Heinrich was one of only a few members of the CDU who voted against the lifetime extension of nuclear power plans in October 2010. From 2012, Heinrich became involved, together with 12 other CDU colleagues, in efforts to strengthen tax equality of same-sex partnerships within the law on civil unions. In June 2017, however, he voted against Germany’s introduction of same-sex marriage.

Under the umbrella of the German parliaments’ godparenthood program for human rights activists, Heinrich has been raising awareness for the work of persecuted Colombian lawyer Iván Cepeda Castro since 2014.

In 2019, Heinrich joined 14 members of his parliamentary group who, in an open letter, called for the party to rally around Angela Merkel and party chairwoman Annegret Kramp-Karrenbauer amid criticism voiced by conservatives Friedrich Merz and Roland Koch.

== Publications ==
- Frank Heinrich; Uwe Heimowski (2017), Frank und Frei. Warum ich für die Freiheit kämpfe (in German), Holzgerlingen: SCM Hänssler, ISBN 978-3-7751-7363-6
- Frank Heinrich; Uwe Heimowski (2016), Der verdrängte Skandal - Menschenhandel in Deutschland (in German), Moers: Brendow Verlag, ISBN 978-3-86506-894-1
- Frank Heinrich; Uwe Heimowski (2016), Ich lebe! Ein Plädoyer für die Würde des Menschen (in German), Neukirchen-Vluyn: Neukirchener Verlagsgesellschaft, ISBN 978-3-7615-6301-4
- Frank Heinrich; Uwe Heimowski (2013), Mission: Verantwortung. Von der Heilsarmee in den Bundestag (in German), Schwarzenfeld: Neufeld Verlag, ISBN 978-3-86256-039-4
- Frank Heinrich (2009), Lieben, was das Zeug hält: Wie Gott unser Herz verändert (in German), Schwarzenfeld: Neufeld Verlag, ISBN 978-3-937896-83-0
