= Nora Seitz =

German politician (born 1984)

Member of the Bundestag
- Incumbent
- Assumed office 25 March 2025
- Constituency: Saxony

Personal details
- Born: 10 May 1984 (age 41)
- Party: Christian Democratic Union (since 2009)

Nora Seitz (born 10 May 1984) is a German politician who was elected as a member of the Bundestag in 2025. She has served as chairwoman of the Mittelstands- und Wirtschaftsunion in Saxony since 2023.
