= Frank Müller-Rosentritt =

German politician (born 1982)

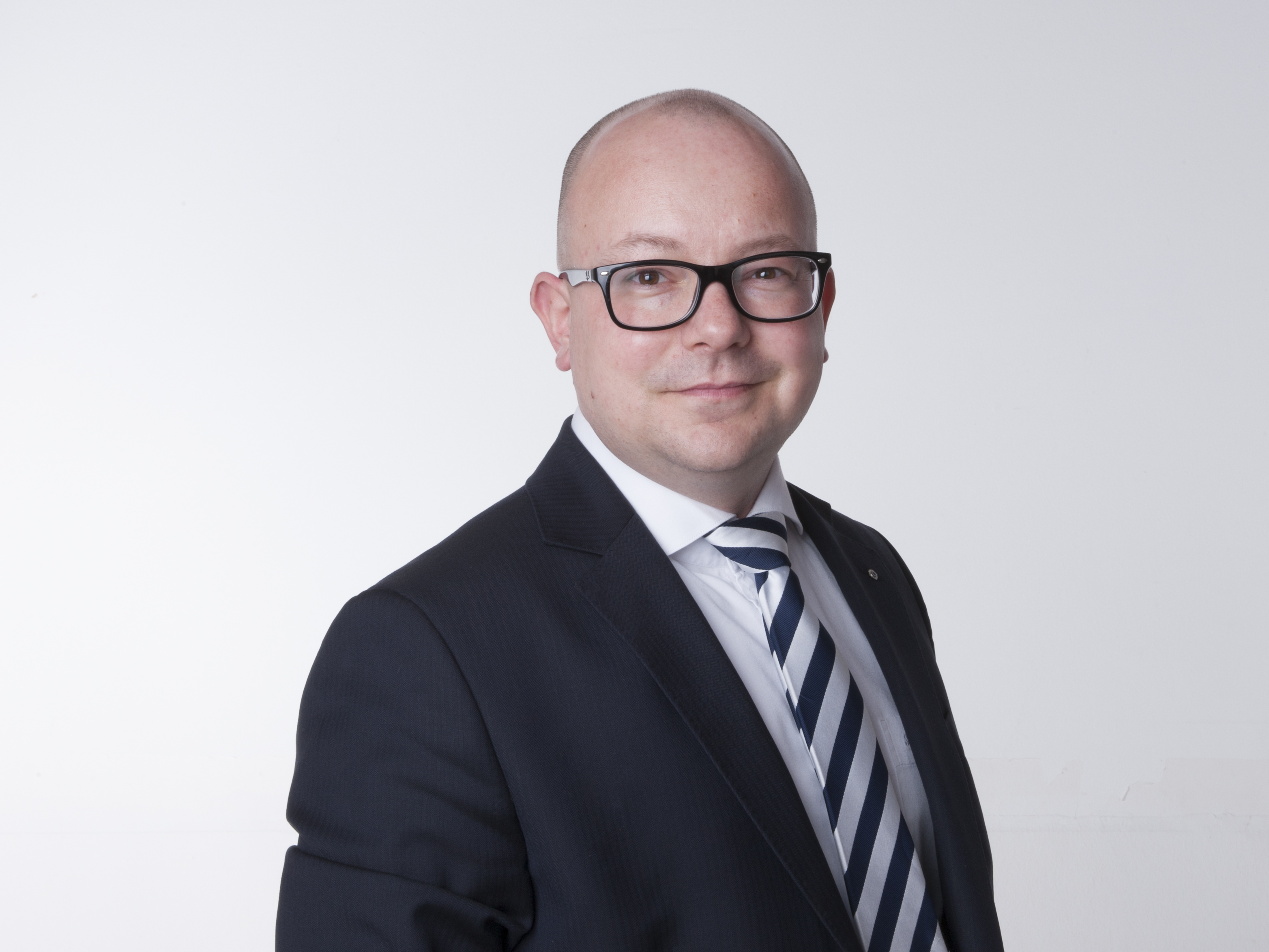
- Frank Müller-Rosentritt in 2017

Member of the Bundestag
- In office 2017–2025

Personal details
- Born: 13 June 1982 (age 44) Chemnitz, East Germany (now Germany)
- Party: FDP
- Children: 3
- Education: Baden-Württemberg Cooperative State University

Frank Müller-Rosentritt (born 13 June 1982) is a German politician of the Free Democratic Party (FDP) who served as a member of the Bundestag from the state of Saxony from 2017 to 2025.

== Political career ==
From 2019 to 2021, Müller-Rosentritt served as chairman of the FDP in Saxony.

In the negotiations to form a so-called traffic light coalition of the Social Democratic Party (SPD), the Green Party and the FDP following the 2021 federal elections, Müller-Rosentritt was part of his party's delegation in the working group on foreign policy, defence, development cooperation and human rights, co-chaired by Heiko Maas, Omid Nouripour and Alexander Graf Lambsdorff.

In November 2024, Müller-Rosentritt announced that he would not stand in the 2025 federal elections but instead resign from active politics by the end of the parliamentary term.
