= Aftermath of the Bronze Night =

Reactions and consequences of the Bronze Night, the 2007 riots in Estonia

The Bronze Soldier of Tallinn is a Soviet World War II memorial in Tallinn, Estonia. In 2007, it was relocated by the government. Disagreements over the relocation escalated into protests and eventually rioting, in what became known as the Bronze Night.

== Political reactions ==
Estonia — President Toomas Hendrik Ilves appealed for calm and described the rioters as criminals due to the damage they had caused:

"All this had nothing to do with the inviolability of graves or keeping alive the memory of men fallen in World War II"... "He said that the common denominator of last night's criminals was not their nationality, but their desire to riot, vandalize and plunder".

Estonia – Prime Minister Andrus Ansip said in a televised address, in Estonian and Russian, that he was forced to remove the statue after the first riots on Thursday night. He said the statue was under police guard and was safe. It and any remains would be moved to a military cemetery.

"We must not let the sowers of hatred become the ones to split the nation or to plant prejudice", he said. "All nationalities were respected" ... "but violence was not". The memory of dead soldiers was not served when "a picture of a drunk shoplifter is being shown all over the world."

Estonia – Mayor Edgar Savisaar of the City of Tallinn has expressed concern that removal of the monument might have constituted a breach of city property rights and have violated the Constitution of Estonia. As of May 10, no known legal claims to the effect have been made by the City of Tallinn against the Ministry of Defence, or the Government of the Republic of Estonia, neither through courts of law nor through the Justice Chancellor.

Russia – Belittling the World War II heroes' feats and desecrating monuments erected in their memory leads to discord and mistrust between countries and peoples, Russian president Vladimir Putin has said on Victory Day. "Those who try to belittle that priceless experience and desecrate monuments to war heroes today insult their own nations as well and sow discord and new mistrust between countries and peoples", Putin said at a parade on Red Square marking the 62nd anniversary of the Soviet Union's victory over Nazi Germany in 1945.

Russia – The Federation Council, on April 27, approved a statement concerning the monument, which urges the Russian authorities to take the "toughest possible measures" against Estonia:

The dismantling of the monument on the eve of Victory Day on May 9 is "just one aspect of the policy, disastrous for Estonians, being conducted by provincial zealots of Nazism,"... "These admirers of Nazism forget that politicians come and go, while the peoples in neighboring countries are neighbors for eternity. The dismantling of the monument and the mockery of the remains of the fallen soldiers is just more evidence of the vengeful policy toward Russians living in Estonia and toward Russia".

Council of Europe: On April 27, the president of the Parliamentary Assembly of the Council of Europe (PACE) René van der Linden expressed his regrets on the decision of the Estonian authorities to remove the Bronze Soldier memorial as this act is widening the rift between the country's citizens of Estonian and Russian origin. "I understand that the monument is controversial as it symbolises, although in different ways, painful moments of Estonia and Russia's past. Precisely because of this, the soldiers that this memorial commemorates should have been left to rest in peace rather than being used as a political tool." The President expressed his disappointment that Estonia had not heeded the appeals for a common understanding over the issue of the Bronze Soldier that he made earlier this year to the Estonian and Russian delegations to PACE.

Council of Europe: On May 5, the Council of Europe Secretary General Terry Davis called on all sides involved to use the occasion of the 62nd anniversary of the victory against the Nazis to bring an end to the dispute about the moving of the Monument to fallen Soviet soldiers in Tallinn. Davis expressed his understanding for the reasons why the Estonian authorities have decided to move the remains of these soldiers, but also reservations about the way it has been done. He called on politicians and public in Estonia to draw conclusions from these events and accept that on such delicate and potentially divisive matters, even the best intentioned initiatives may backfire if they are not prepared, discussed and implemented with appropriate sensitivity. Davis called on the Russian authorities to be more respectful and less emotional in the way they express their opinions on such a sensitive issue. In conclusion, he welcomed the decision to commemorate the Monument at its new location on the occasion of the ceremonies marking the end of World War II. He underlined that this choice of date places the symbol of the Bronze Soldier in its proper context – the liberation of Europe and provides an ideal opportunity to end this dispute.

Russia – First Deputy Prime Minister Sergei Ivanov said that adequate measures, primarily, economic ones, should be taken against Estonia:

"In particular, Russia must speed up the construction of modern ports on Russian territory on the Baltic Sea, in the towns of Ust-Luga, Primorsk and Vysotsk. Thereby, we will handle our own cargo flow and not allow other countries, including Estonia, to benefit from its transit. I have already ordered and instructed the Minister of Transport accordingly."

European Union – Although the EU has not issued an official statement, foreign policy chief Javier Solana has voiced support for Estonia and denounced violence in the wake of a night of unrest in Tallinn:

"Solana phoned President Toomas Hendrik Ilves today and said the EU understands and supports Estonia", the president's adviser Toomas Sildam said.

Serbia – On May 3, the Ministry of Foreign Affairs of Serbia issued a statement:

"The future of Europe is also based on full commitment to shared and best pages of European history, whereas the victory over Nazism and fascism more than half a century ago undoubtedly ranks among those pages deserving lasting admiration among all in Europe and in the world."

Condemning the unilateral action by Estonian authorities on the eve of 9 May as contrary to this commitment, it states: "The highest respect for such monuments in today's Germany is noteworthy. We in Serbia shall forever place flowers on the graves of the Red Army soldiers fallen in the battles for the liberation of Serbia and Belgrade from Nazi occupiers. We shall do so also on 9 May this year."

European Union – On May 2, EU demanded Russia to implement the Vienna Convention on Diplomatic Relations and secure proper protection for the Estonian embassy in Moscow. EuroCommission spokesperson Christiana Homan said:

We share the concern about the growing tension around Estonia's embassy, and demand that Russian authorities implement their obligations within the Vienna Convention on Diplomatic Relations,

European Union – On May 9 (Europe Day), the Estonia-Russia relations were discussed at the European Parliament. Several members of the Parliament expressed their support for Estonia. E.g. Brian Crowley said

I would like to join my colleagues in firstly giving our solidarity and support to the Estonian Government and to the Estonian people and, secondly, in denouncing the bully-boy tactics of the Russian Government in what they have attempted to create - the uncertainty and instability, not only within Estonia but in all the Baltic States.

In many ways what we are witnessing is a new form of totalitarianism or authoritarianism by utilisation of mobs in Moscow to attack an Embassy, by utilising the power or strength of energy to try to make people kneel to the influence of the Russian Government and, most importantly of all, by a continuing desire to keep imposing symbols of domination and of subjugation in areas that have gained their independence from totalitarian regimes. Finally, may I say, a most ardent call should go out to the citizens of Estonia to show them that now that they are part of the European Union, they will not be abandoned as they were abandoned previously.

On 10 May the EU parliament adopted by a great majority a formal resolution criticizing Russia's human rights record. Estonia's question centered the debate with MEPs representing various political groups showing strong support for Estonia. Joseph Daul, leader of the biggest European party EPP-DE claimed that the EU is united with regard to the issue:

"today, we are all Estonians"

Belarus – On April 27, Belarusian MFA Press Secretary Andrei Popov in his Comments on the Events in Estonia said that

"Belarus is the country that lost every third of its citizens during the Second World War. Any outrage upon the memory of the victims of that war causes us the sentiments of deep indignation and regret. ... We believe that today it is obvious to everybody that the irresponsible actions of the authorities were the major cause for such dramatic events. We regret that the Estonian leadership has failed to have enough political wisdom not to fight the dead. ... We are also outraged with the unjustified and brutal use of force by the Estonian police towards peaceful demonstrators that led to escalated violence and unrest in the Estonian capital."

NATO – NATO statement on Estonia:

NATO is deeply concerned by threats to the physical safety of Estonian diplomatic staff, including the Ambassador, in Moscow, as well as intimidation at the Estonian Embassy. These actions are unacceptable, and must be stopped immediately; tensions over the Soviet war memorial and graves in Estonia must be resolved diplomatically between the two countries. NATO urges the Russian authorities to implement their obligations under the Vienna Convention on diplomatic relations.

UN – UN Secretary-General Ban Ki-moon has called on Russia and Estonia to resolve their dispute over the removal of a Soviet war memorial from the Estonian capital:

The Secretary-General regrets the violence and the loss of life in Tallinn, Estonia. He appeals to all concerned to deal with the issues at hand in a spirit of respect and conciliation.

Latvia – The Latvian Ministry of Foreign Affairs "strongly condemns acts of vandalism in Tallinn which took place over night between 26 and 27 April" according to their press release:

"In a democratic country, any group of society which disagrees with government decisions is free to express its own opinion, however, it must not violate the law. Acts of vandalism which pose a threat to the life and health of people and damage and destroy property have nothing in common with the democratic forms of protest."

Lithuania – President of the Republic of Lithuania Valdas Adamkus announced that Lithuania is concerned and watching over the events in Tallinn and that it fully supports the positions of the Estonian government.

"There is no doubt that respect should be shown to the memory of the fallen soldiers. However, the Soviet Army didn't bring freedom to the Baltic states, so can we blame Estonia if the Soviet soldiers' remains from a central Tallinn square are reinterred in another cemetery? "

Lithuania – Lithuanian Seimas unanimously passed a statement in Estonia's support, calling Russia's response to the Bronze Soldier's removal an:

"interference into Estonia's domestic affairs". "Considering the events in Tallinn, and the interior and international tension they caused, Seimas of Lithuania stands together with the Estonian government on the issue of moving the monument to Soviet soldiers from the center of Estonia's capital to a war memorial,"

Finland – Prime Minister Matti Vanhanen noted that the "...demonstrations and riots are of course an interior matter of Estonia", in an interview given to television:

"Finland nor other countries do not have to get involved. As they are occurring in an area near Finland, then we will of course keep a very close eye on them."

"It is not part of international etiquette for politicians to request the resignation of a foreign government's ministry, it just doesn't suit"

Poland – The Ministry of Foreign Affairs issued a statement, hoping that clashes in Estonia would calm down. The ministry also called on the European Union to show support for Estonia, saying:

"[Estonia] should not be left to stand alone" ... "Yet again the difficult history is casting a shadow on relations between states and nations and ethnic groups".

Poland – President Lech Kaczyński held two telephone conversations with Estonian president Toomas Ilves, during which he expressed support for actions made by Estonian authorities and declared Poland will make appropriate actions within European Union to support Estonia. Among other topics, conversation also involved the situation of Estonian Embassy in Moscow.

Poland – The Polish minister of culture Kazimierz Ujazdowski has confirmed on 30 April that symbols of the communist dictatorship will be removed from the streets all over the country. He said that, on May 15, a new law will go into effect that will make it easier for local authorities to remove communist symbols. However, this law will not apply to cemeteries.

Germany – Although Germany has not issued an official statement, Finnish newspaper Helsingin Sanomat reported that German Chancellor Angela Merkel phoned both Andrus Ansip and Vladimir Putin and asked that the parliaments of the two countries start discussions over the conflict.

Ukraine – On May 1, the Minister for Foreign Affairs of Ukraine Arseniy Yatsenyuk in his comments on the situation, which emerged following dismantling of the memorial of the Soldier Liberator in the centre of Tallinn, said that "Ukraine advocates the soonest resolution of temporary misunderstandings in bilateral relations of Russia and Estonia." Arseniy Yatsenyuk stressed the necessity to hold procedure of removal of the memorial in accordance with existing standards, rendering the necessary honours to soldiers of the Second World War. At the same time he urged to respect position of Estonian authorities as well.

Sweden – Minister of Foreign Affairs Carl Bildt said that what is happening in Estonia is an internal matter and that the outcome forms an intricate part of Estonia's independence. He has faith in the Estonians to sort it out and believes it to be important that they do so themselves, without international interference. Carl Bildt also pointed out that he "understands why the popular reaction about the statue has been so sharp":

"If somebody had erected a statue of King Christian the Tyrant in Stockholm 500 years after [the Stockholm Bloodbath of 1520], it would also have been a subject of controversy.

Norway – Foreign Minister Jonas Gahr Støre announced that both sides should stop the violence and start respecting each other.

Kyrgyzstan – On April 27 the Kyrgyz Parliament condemned the dismantling of the monument, calling it "an act against history."

United States – On May 2, US's State Department released a press statement, stating that "[d]ecisions on placement of the memorial to soldiers who died fighting the Nazis in World War II belong to the Estonian government" and expressing concern about continuing reports of violence and harassment, including harassment of Estonian diplomatic personnel and premises in Moscow.

United States – On May 3, the United States Senate expressed "its strong support for Estonia as a sovereign state and a member of the North Atlantic Treaty Organisation (NATO) and the Organization of Security and Cooperation in Europe (OSCE) as it deals with matters internal to its country".

Georgia – Georgia expressed support to Estonia:

The Georgian Parliament passed a resolution on May 8 condemning the attempts to provoke riots and facts of hooliganism in the streets of Estonian towns following a row over the relocation of a Soviet memorial in Tallinn. The resolution also condemned violent actions against the Estonian diplomats carried out by protesters outside the Estonian embassy in Moscow. The Georgian Parliament fully supports measures undertaken by the Estonian authorities to restore order", the resolution reads.

"Georgia also categorically condemns Russia's inability to end assaults on the Estonian embassy in Moscow and on the Estonian Ambassador"

according to Georgian Parliament's speaker Nino Burjanadze, who added that Russia's constant intervention into Estonia's domestic affairs violates international conventions

Estonia – Responding to the Vladimir Putin statement, Estonian PM Andrus Ansip claimed that by referring to desecration Mr Putin may have meant the monument to the Soviet World War II fighter pilots, removed along with the graves by the local administration of Moscow suburb Khimki just prior to Estonia's events. Remains from Khimki memorial had been reburied with military honours several days before both Putin's and Ansip's statements.

Israel – Shimon Peres, at that time vice premier, who would later be the president of Israel, noted that the matter was "Estonia's internal matter, and foreigners should be careful with their comments about it", to journalists when visiting Tallinn to inaugurate a synagogue. He also noted that "The government has handled it with great care and great wisdom and the conclusion is positive."

European Union – On May 24, the European Parliament adopted a resolution in which it expressed support for and solidarity with Estonia.

== Other reactions ==
Gerhard Schröder, former German Chancellor (social democratic, SPD), said that the removal was insulting to Russians who died fighting Nazi Germany:

"The way Estonia is dealing with the memory of young Russian soldiers who lost their lives in the fight against fascism is in bad taste and irreverent"

(Tajikistan) The Tajik Council of War Veterans condemned the removal of the statue.

Katyn Committee (relatives of Polish officers, who were executed on the orders of the Soviet authorities in the village of Katyn) in Poland, said:

"[Estonia] suffered from the Soviet occupation, while Soviet monuments have always been the symbol of slavery and lies, as well as Russian chauvinism. The Katyn Committee expresses solidarity with the sovereign government of Estonia and approves its decision to remove the Soviet monuments, sites of the 'Red' empire. We are indignant at Russian official statements threatening to cut off diplomatic ties with Estonia."

(Russia) On April 28 three large Russian supermarket networks: Seventh Continent, Kopeika and Samokhval (Самохвал) banned all Estonian commodities.

(Estonia) The Mayor of Tallinn and the oppositional Centre Party chairman Edgar Savisaar condemned the disproportional use of force by the police stating that there is no explanation why several policemen should apply physical force against a handcuffed detainee. He also stated that the central government should compensate the city of Tallinn the losses caused by the unrest over the relocation of the monument. According to the Savisaar the direct losses exceed 40–50 million Estonian kroons (2.5 – 3 million EUR) As a reaction to his statement (disapproved of by many leading Estonian politicians), the Estonian National Movement started to collect signatures on Internet for Mayor Savisaar's resignation.

(Russia) On May 1, Moscow Mayor Yury Luzhkov has proposed to boycott everything related to Estonia for "actions taken against the Bronze Soldier Monument and graves of our soldiers". He said that Russian companies should cut their relations with partners in Estonia. "One should tell our business: stop contacts with Estonia. The country showed its negative, and I would say fascist face", the mayor said, adding: "No one will be able to re-write the history."

International Helsinki Federation for Human Rights:

"According to media reports as well as reports received by the IHF, police in some cases used disproportionate force against riot participants. Some protesters were reportedly hit with batons, beaten and mistreated after being taken into custody in a temporary detention facility established in a terminal at the Tallinn port. Some cases of apparent police brutality were documented by TV broadcasts and cell phone recordings.

The riots in Tallinn and other Estonian cities have served to highlight remaining problems relating to the integration of the country's Russian-speaking minority, which constitutes about one third of the 1.4 million residents. Despite a number of important legislative reforms since the first years of independence, this minority is still not officially recognized as a linguistic minority and continues to face discrimination and exclusion in everyday life, thus fostering frustration and resentment among its members. Many Russian-speakers still lack Estonian citizenship, Russian-language education has gradually been reduced and stringent language requirements restrict access to the labor market for Russian-speakers. "

The veteran politician and human rights activist Sergey Kovalyov writes in the Polish newspaper Gazeta Wyborcza that Russia's position is hypocritical and implies double standards. In his opinion Russia opposes the removal of the monument because it is still led by successors of the Stalinist era, who have never apologized to the Eastern Europe for having turned it into a concentration camp.

(Estonia) Estonian media expert Tarmu Tammerk compares heavy criticism and calls to discharge of sociologist Juhan Kivirähk, who called for resignation of Estonian government, to an attempt of the Ansip government to establish "üks rahvas, üks riik, üks juht" ("one people, one state, one leader") ideology referring to the notorious citation "Ein Volk, ein Reich, ein Führer" by Adolf Hitler and states that sociologists must have full freedom of speech.

Andres Põder the current Archbishop of the Evangelical Lutheran Church of Estonia, said that it was right thing for defending grave peace to rebury Soviet soldiers' remains to cemetery and also remove the memorial which had become a symbol of occupation and ground of political provocations.

(Estonia) Artur Taevere, founder of Heateo Sihtasutus, and other young volunteers have started a campaign "Valge tulp / Белый тюльпан", asking Estonians and Russians to place white tulips at sites that are of emotional value to members of the other ethnic community to counteract the bad feelings that the events have caused.

On May 7 Chief Rabbi of Russia Berel Lazar has called on the Estonian authorities to review their position regarding the reburial of the remains of Soviet soldiers in Tallinn. He said that "When Nazism unfortunately rears its ugly head in Europe today and as there have been attempts to deny the Holocaust, Estonia is acting in a manner that insults memory, which alarms us". He added that "The Jewish people will always regard what the Soviet soldiers did as a heroic feat" In addition, Jews consider remains of those people "holy, and reburial is allowed only in exceptional cases." On July 4, 2007, in a speech delivered as a part of reburial of remains of Yelena Varshavskaya at Mount of Olives in Jerusalem, Russia's Chief Rabbi Berl Lazar, who conducted her reburial, denounced statements describing the Soviet soldiers as occupants.

On May 1 Patriarch Alexius II of Moscow and All Russia, who was born in Tallinn, said after a service at Moscow's Intercession Monastery that The Estonian government's struggle against the memory of soldiers who fell in battle against fascism is indecent. "Fighting against the dead, against the soldiers who have always been honored by all nations, is the most unworthy deed. It is immoral to profane the memory of the dead", he said. "Greater love has no one than this, that one lay down his life for his friends. This is what Christ our Savior said." The Patriarch added that "When (Estonian) political leaders use the words as "drunkards" and "marauders", it is unworthy of the politician or a statesman.

(Russia) On May 3 The Russian Congress of Jewish Religious Organizations and Associations (KEROOR) issued a statement criticizing the Estonian government for relocating a Soviet World War II memorial in Tallinn and for alleged Nazi sympathies. "The demonstratively defiant form in which the Estonian authorities have dismantled the Monument to the Liberator Warrior and are relocating the nearby grave of soldiers who gave their lives fighting fascism is not an accidental or spontaneous act", the KEROOR said in a statement. "Estonian authorities prefer to gloss over the fact that punitive detachments and the Estonian SS legion killed between 120,000 and 140,000 Russians, Jews, Ukrainians, Belarusians, Gypsies, and people of other ethnic groups during 1941-1944."

On April 30 Simon Wiesenthal Center criticized the removal from the center of Tallinn to a military cemetery by the Estonian government late last week of "a Soviet memorial commemorating the defeat of Nazi Germany", which had stood for decades in the center of the Estonian capital". In a statement issued in Jerusalem by its chief Nazi-hunter, Israel director Dr. Efraim Zuroff, the Center asserted that the removal of the monument minimizes the severity of the crimes of the Holocaust in Estonia and insults the Nazis' victims in the country.

Russian professor of economy, Konstantin Sonin, condemned the relocation of Bronze Soldier in The Moscow Times article on May 8, 2007, saying that not only "the Estonian government clearly did not show its best side", but also "journalists who wrote of the "Russian monster" in an editorial published in one of Estonia's most popular newspapers crossed all conceivable limits of journalistic etiquette and political correctness". The author discussed possible alternative ways for Russian response to such hostile actions. These could be limiting temporarily access to the memorial to the victims of the violent resettlement of the Baltic peoples or reducing funding for taking care of certain halls within the Museum of Political Repression. Sonin concludes that implementation of these methods is so far impossible, because Russia does not have any such monuments to the suffering of people from other countries

(Russia) On May 9 longtime human rights activist and World War II veteran Yelena Bonner called on Russians to acknowledge that the victory did not result in the liberation for many countries, including the Baltic nations. "We didn't liberate anyone, we weren't even able to liberate ourselves, although for four difficult years of war we hoped for it. We even said 'After the war, if we survive it, all life will be different.' It didn't happen; not in 1945, not in 1991!" she wrote in an e-mailed statement.

== Nashi movement ==
On June 4, 2007, three members of the Nashi movement, clothed in tent coats, proceeded to stand in for the Bronze Soldier in its former location. Estonian authorities responded by cancelling their tourism visas for non-tourism activities and deported all three to Russia.

On June 14, 2007, Russian authorities expressed concern of the discrepancy between a 13-member list of burials and only 12 exhumed bodies, accusing Estonian archeologists of losing the thirteenth body. Estonian government has refuted the claims, based on the dig's final report concluding there were no more burials in this area, and instead proposed that captain Sysoyev was mistakenly added to the 13-member list in the postwar confusion.

The Nashi movement had planned pickets in Estonia on September 22, 2007, to commemorate "liberation of Tallinn from fascism". After the Estonian embassy in Moscow refused to issue visas for such purpose, pickets were instead held in front of the embassy.

In December 2007, Estonia became a party to the Schengen treaty. As a result, people banned from entering Estonia have also been banned from entry into the whole Schengen space. Several Nashi activists deported from Estonia for visa violation (including staging the "memory guard" pickets) before it became part of Schengen have been unable to gain entry into other Schengen countries (, ). Estonia allegedly also used its membership to deny entry to Nashi activists not involved in protests in Estonia. A Lithuanian court has convicted another similarly blacklisted activist of illegal border crossing, sentenced him to 30 days of arrest, and confiscated his night sight equipment and large amounts of cash as contraband.

Some Nashi activists picketed the European Commission's Moscow offices on Tuesday to protest EU travel restrictions. Picket had been called "anti-Estonian" by the Estonian media.

The blacklisting lead Nashi to accuse the European Union of violating democratic principles that European officials often accuse Russia of violating, echoing sentiments by then-President of Russia Vladimir Putin who often accused European officials of applying double standards to Russia.

== Claims of police brutality ==
The secretary of the Estonian Anti-Fascist Committee and at the same time the chairman of the Constitution Party Andrei Zarenkov claimed that as detention centers are overcrowded many of the detainees were taken to a cargo terminal in Tallinn seaport. "People were forced to squat for hours or lie on the concrete floor with their hands tied behind their backs. The police used plastic handcuffs which caused great pain", he said. "The security men selectively beat the detainees including women and teenagers. We have an account that they beat a 12-year-old girl lying on the floor for attempting to stand up. We have pictures of a toilet which is stained with the blood of the injured detainees", Zarenkov said. He said that all the accounts would be collected, documented and submitted to human rights groups.

The police has denied the claims of the Anti-Fascist Committee. A spokesman for the northern police prefecture, Harrys Puusepp, refuted the charges of ill treatment of the detainees and also said that rumors of the resignation of police officers (see below) are untrue. "Nobody has beaten them. They have been treated politely. All amenities were provided for them and medical assistance was offered. Those who spent more than 12 hours in detention were supplied with meals", he said.

The Estonian Chancellor of Justice has checked on these claims, visited all detention centres, and found no signs of violations of Constitution, nor any detainees who would support claims of police brutality or make complaints.

As of May 22, 2007 the office of Prosecutor General of Estonia received more than fifty complaints on the police brutality, after checking the facts seven criminal cases against police have been opened.

On May 1 Finnish tabloid Iltalehti published an interview with German nationals Klaus and Lucas Dornemanns (65 and 35 years old). According to their story the Dornemanns were just walking in the area of Freedom Square when they were beaten and arrested by the police. However by their own later admission they attempted to cross the square between the lines of the security forces and demonstrators who were in a stand-off position. The son spent 8 hours in the terminal D and his 65-year-old father 10 hours. According to them at least half of the detainees had no connection to the vandalism on the Tallinn streets. Still they were denied access to water and toilets, they were even forbidden to move. If anybody attempted to stand up they were beaten by the police. The article provides photograph of the Dornemanns showing large hematomas over their bodies.

Members of the special fact-finding mission of Russian Federation's Duma also visited the WCs of the detention area in temporary detention area in the D terminal of Port of Tallinn, looking for blood stains caused by beatings erroneously reported by some newspapers, and found none.

Zarenkov also claimed that about 350 Russian-speaking police officers want to resign, or have already resigned, from Estonian police force so as not to participate in ostensibly violent actions to stop the unrest, such as mandatory beating of women and children. Such claims have been refuted by Estonian police.

In November 2007, the UN Committee Against Torture has considered Estonia's report and expressed concern over "allegations of brutality and excessive use of force by law enforcement personnel, especially with regard to the disturbances that occurred in Tallinn in April 2007, well documented by a detailed compilation of complaints". In 2011, the Committee for the Prevention of Torture (Council of Europe) has published its report on its 2007 visit to Estonia, stating that many of the persons detained by the police in connection with the April 2007 events in Tallinn were not granted all the fundamental safeguards (the right of those concerned to inform a close relative or another third party of their choice of their situation, the right of access to a lawyer, and the right of access to a doctor) from the outset of their detention: while many of the persons concerned were allowed to contact someone and to be assisted by a lawyer only when brought before a judge, a number of detained persons claimed that their requests to see a doctor whilst in police custody had been denied, even when they displayed visible injuries.

== Situation at the Estonian embassy in Moscow ==
In the days following the relocation, the Embassy of Estonia in Moscow was besieged by protesters, including pro-Kremlin youth organisations Nashi and the Young Guard of United Russia.

On Monday, April 30, Estonia's foreign minister Urmas Paet reported that "the situation had become much worse in the previous night. The building is by now completely blocked." Paet says that Estonia's foreign ministry had sent a note to Russia's foreign ministry, due to Russia's apparent unwillingness and impotency to defend the embassy building and its staff (which violates Diplomatic law, especially the Vienna Convention on Diplomatic Relations). Estonia's foreign ministry claims that the life and health of the diplomats and their family members residing in Moscow have been directly threatened.

Estonia's president Toomas Hendrik Ilves expressed his astonishment that Russia has – despite the promises of foreign minister Lavrov – not taken actions to protect the diplomatic personnel. In Ilves' opinion, the ostensible powerlessness of Russia's defense services (e.g. OMON) is especially surprising, given their quick work when dispersing meetings of Russian opposition forces.

On the same day, members of the crowd protesting before the embassy declared that if Estonian authorities would not set a date for the restoration of the Bronze Soldier statue in its former prominent place, they would begin demolishing the Estonian embassy building on May 1 (traditionally also Labour Day, important in Russia and the former Soviet Union). The building itself was covered with graffiti and stones were thrown at it.

During the night, protesters, both from pro-Putin and Communist parties, were playing and singing aloud famous Soviet war marches of the Red Army. They called the Estonians Fascists.

On May 2, the protesters attacked the Estonian ambassador, Marina Kaljurand, during a press conference, however the assailants were dispersed by security guards using pepper spray. The vehicle of the Swedish ambassador was also attacked. Family members of the embassy staff have been evacuated. During the night of May 2 – May 3, the Estonian embassy in Moscow was stoned by unknown vandals; there were also protests around the embassy of Georgia (Georgia has expressed support for Estonia).

On May 3, the ambassador Kaljurand left Moscow on a two-week vacation. The protesters ended their blockade the same day. There has been speculation that the vacation was suggested by Germany's Foreign Minister Frank-Walter Steinmeier (by means of behind-the-scenes realpolitik) to soothe Russian-Estonian tensions.

On May 1, Estonian foreign minister Urmas Paet suggested to consider calling off the upcoming EU-Russia Summit that was due to take place on 18 May: "We consider it necessary that the European Union react in the toughest way to Russia's behavior. It might imply suspending or canceling various negotiations. Postponing the EU-Russia Summit should be seriously considered". Paet stated that "the EU is under attack, because Russia is attacking Estonia."

Spokesperson for German Chancellor Angela Merkel told that the summit will not be postponed, but European Commission said that a decision to raise the issue at the EU-Russia Summit depends on the development of the current situation. Commission spokesperson Christiane Hohmann said: "We share the concerns about the increasing violence around the Estonian embassy in Moscow and we strongly urge the Russian authorities to implement their obligations under the Vienna Convention for diplomatic relations".

=== Threatened and alleged sanctions ===
On May 3, 2007, Russia suddenly announced plans for repairs to railway lines to Estonia, disrupting oil and coal exports to Estonia. As a result, oil companies scurried to secure alternative export routes. Normally Estonia's ports handle about a quarter of such shipments from Russia to world markets. Although Russia denied it was imposing economic sanctions or taking politically inspired action against Estonia, it is suspected that the sudden railway repair plan is connected to the row over the war memorial.

The Russian transport firm Severstaltrans says it is suspending construction of an $80m (£40m) car plant in Estonia.

One of the largest Russian dailies Komsomolskaya Pravda issued a call for Russia-wide boycott of Estonian goods, later re-newed with addition of a list of undertakings, deemed "anti-Russian".

== Propaganda ==
=== Pro-rioter propaganda ===
Even before the first riot, rumours were circulated that under cover of the tent, the monument had been demolished and the war victims buried underneath thrown out as trash. These rumours were supported with a fake photo depicting the statue sawed off above feet. After the first night of rioting, the direction of the propaganda changed towards attempts to justify the rioting, declaring the rioters to be peaceful demonstrators and the arrested suspected vandals political prisoners, and making various accusations towards the government of Estonia.

Leader of the Constitutional party Andrei Zarenkov claimed on Friday morning that the bones had already been dug up and thrown away and the statue cut to pieces and scrapped. He was sure, it was never going to be restored. A day later the same man claimed that more than 350 ethnic Russian police officers have already or will be resigning shortly in protest to having to discipline rioters. These claims of his were soon refuted as outright lies by police officials

The State Infosystems' Development Center has evaluated the ongoing DDoS attack on Estonian government's and infrastructural Internet servers as being partly motivated by desire to suppress flow of information regarding the events from Estonia to other countries.

A number of video clips, usually taken via cellphone camera, have appeared on YouTube under the keyword 'eSStonia', ostensibly to corroborate the police brutality claims. According to Estonian newspaper Eesti Päevaleht, most of them are mislabelled, apparently in an attempt to frame the incidents recorded in the clips in a pro-rioter way. For example, the clip labelled "eSStonia - Police car crushes pedestrians crowd" features no pedestrian-menacing cars.

==== Pro-rioter propaganda in Russia ====
Distinctly, many participants in the blockade believe that what were characterised as "riots" by Estonian official sources were actually a peaceful political demonstration and that Dmitri (also spelt Dmitry) Ganin, the man that died in the riots died through police brutality while attempting to defend the monument. He has been ceremonially declared a "hero of Russia" by activists involved in the blockade.

=== Dmitri Linter ===
On May 4, Rambler-news reported that Mr. Linter had been taken by the Estonian law enforcement from the Mustamäe hospital under an intravenous line, and that his health and whereabouts had been withheld from his family since. These claim were soon refuted by the State Procurature, whose official release declares that "[Linter] was taken to the hospital because he claimed to have "various ills", he was given a full medical and declared healthy".

== Law enforcement response ==
The police are treating the riots as disorderly conduct (a misdemeanor under Estonian law) or severe disorderly conduct committed in a group (a felony under Estonian law), depending on the circumstances of any particular incident, and are proceeding accordingly. About 1,000 suspected rioters were arrested. Acts of vandalism and looting are treated separately, and processed as criminal incidents separate from the rioting.

Three men (Dmitri Linter, Maksim Reva and an 18-year-old school boy Mark Sirõk)have been detained under a court order for up to 6 months, pending investigation of the suspicion of organising riots (a felony under Estonian law punishable of imprisonment of up to 5 years). There were concerns about the health of Mark Sirõ, who has Haemophilia, but his attorney stated that he had no complaints.

Since the riots took place in the centre of the city, after hours of tension, many thousands of frames of photographic and video material of the events are available, both from journalists and security cameras and from witnesses among general public (who usually used cellphone cameras). The police have gathered a number of such photographs depicting unidentified suspects on a website at Identification of Persons (not available from outside Estonia while a foreign DDoS attack on Estonian government servers is underway) and asked the public to identify such unidentified people.

The police have also called for rioters and looters to turn themselves in voluntarily. Aiding law enforcement in investigating one's own unlawful acts, including turning oneself in before an arrest warrant has been issued, is considered a meritorious deed and grounds for lessening punishment under Estonian law.

218 out of almost 300 vandals, who were arrested during events on 26.–28. April, had a previous criminal record. Among their previous crimes are 45 drug-related violations, 91 larcenies and 18 robberies.

=== Trials ===
On June 27, 2007, the media reported of the first batch of trials involving the prosecutors requesting non-suspended sentences. Jevgeni Kazakov, 21, who was pictured looting a half-liter bottle of Sprite, a pack of Orbit chewing gum and two packs of Libresse female sanitary pads, was convicted through the negotiation procedure (comparable to plea bargain of common law legal systems) on June 27, 2007 and sentenced to one year in prison, with two months to be served immediately and the rest suspended for 18 months.

On June 26, 2007, the media reported that Artur Kivik, 19, was sentenced to 2 month "shock incarceration". Sven Anniko, 18, was sentenced to one year in prison suspended for 3 years. Raido, 20, had been convicted and have to pay fine of 2000 EEK. Both Sven and Raido participated in looting of Hugo Boss store and stole some wine from convenience store.

Another accused looter, one 23-year-old Jevgeni (last name not published), reached an agreement of conviction and sentence of immediate one-year imprisonment with the prosecutor, but withdrew from it in front of judge. He had a suspended four-year imprisonment from an earlier conviction; this agreed conviction would have brought him a total of five years immediate real imprisonment. According to the Estonian laws regarding criminal proceedings, his case will now be reviewed by the prosecutor and investigators, and will likely go to a full trial afterwards.

A vandal, Sergei Dolgov, who has no Estonian citizenship but had been convicted before, was convicted in the felony of violation of public order during rioting, over throwing rocks at policemen and vandalising lawn in front of Estonian National Library. He was sentenced to one year of imprisonment, suspended for 18 months.

As of August 2007, the harshest sentence has been that of Vjatšeslav Zjunin, who was sentenced to a year of real imprisonment for looting and had an outstanding suspended sentence from an earlier conviction. Most vandals and looters have been sentenced to community service or relatively small fines, however.

=== Activists' Trial ===
Four Nochnoy Dozor activists have gone on trial in Estonia in January 2008, charged with fomenting unrest during the removal of a Bronze Soldier war memorial. Dmitri Linter, Maksim Reva, Mark Sirők and Dmitri Klenski could face up to five years in prison.

On 5 January 2009 the 4 activists, charged with organization of riots during Bronze Night, were found not guilty by the District Court of Harjumaa. The prosecutor has appealed the ruling, citing numerous legal deficiencies. The acquittal, however, was upheld.

=== Statistics ===
In relation to the rioting, 1200 people were arrested and 491 declared suspects of particular crimes. As of 11 January 2009, 125 people have been convicted. For 283 suspects, the criminal cases were ended without charges.

On most of the trials, the charges pressed were plundering during riots, vandalism during riots, arson during riots and disobedience of lawful police orders. 125 people so charged were convicted, one acquitted, and 10 are pending (including Linter, Reva, Sirők and Klenski).

Most of the damages caused by rioting were compensated by the government's reserve fund. While the Ministry of Treasury undertook gathering and combining the debts so as to collect on them from the convicts, collection on many of them is unlikely due to the different focus of the investigations. In particular, the Ministry of Treasury has paid out 25.6 million crowns of compensation; so far, 66 convicts have been billed for a total of 2.1 million crowns of damages. As of mid-December 2008, less than 85 000 crowns of damages had been paid by the guilty.
