= 2011 Estonian Ministry of Defence attack =

2011 terrorism incident in Tallinn

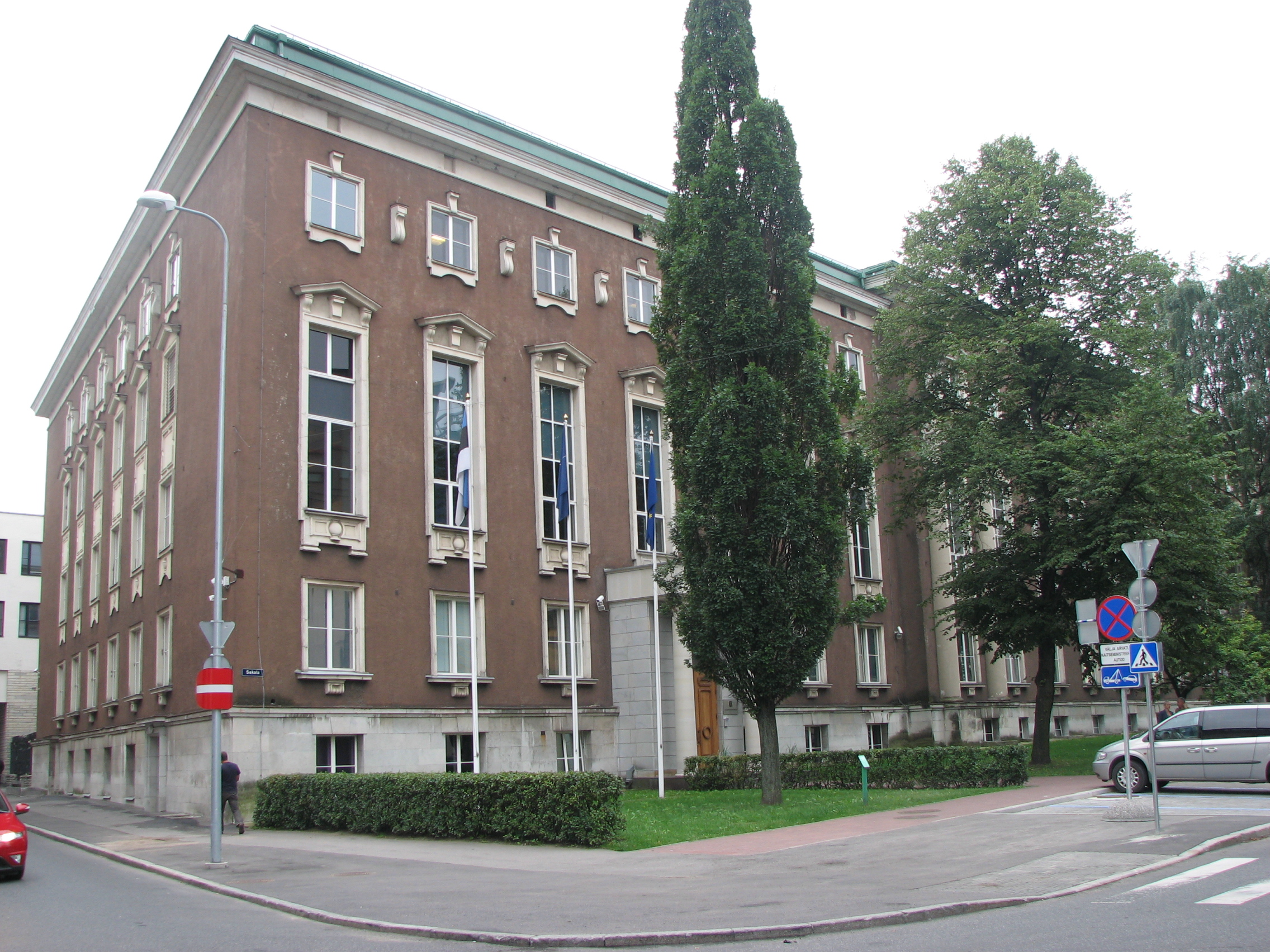
- Estonian Ministry of Defence
- Location: Tallinn, Estonia
- Date: 11 August 2011; 15:00 – 17:30 EEST (UTC+03:00)
- Attack type: Shooting, bombing attempt
- Weapons: Bernardelli P One pistol; IEDs
- Deaths: 1 (the perpetrator)
- Injuries: 1
- Perpetrator: Karen Drambjan

2011 Estonian Ministry of Defence attack was an attack on the Estonian Ministry of Defence building in Tallinn on 11 August 2011 by Karen Drambjan (Armenian: Կարեն Դրամբյան, Russian: Карэн Драмбян, 26 July 1954 – 11 August 2011). He was shot dead in a firefight with the police, after he set off several explosives.

== Attack on the Estonian Ministry of Defence ==
On 11 August 2011 at around 15:00 hours local time Drambjan entered the Estonian Ministry of Defence headquarters building in central Tallinn armed with a pistol with about 100 rounds of ammunition and a bag containing ten to fifteen explosives. He opened fire in the entrance hall and detonated smoke bombs, but was not able to pass a security gate and enter the interior of the building. At the time the building was guarded by members of the Estonian Defence League. He temporarily held two people captive, including one security guard. In a joint operation carried out by the police and the Kaitsepolitsei, the police K-Commando unit stormed the building and killed Drambjan in an exchange of fire.

Defence minister Mart Laar was not in the building at the time.

=== Reactions ===
- Estonian prime minister Andrus Ansip believes Drambjan may have been inspired by the 2011 Norway attacks.
- Dimitri Klenski, a Russian Estonian politician, believes Drambjan was driven into his act by personal problems, not political motivations.
- Sergei Jürgens, leader of the United Left Party, accuses Defence Minister Mart Laar of unjustly associating the actions of Drambjan with the United Left Party.
- Mart Laar, the Estonian defence minister, said Estonia will investigate whether the "massive propaganda attack against Estonia" launched by Russia in the previous week was a factor that inspired Drambjan's attack.

== Karen Drambjan ==
Drambjan was born in Yerevan, and graduated with a law degree from Kaliningrad State University in 1992. In 1993 he was granted Estonian citizenship.

Drambjan ran a law firm in Maardu. In 2007, he defended Larissa Neštšadimova, the spokeswoman of Nochnoy Dozor on charges stemming from a standoff with police near the Bronze Soldier before the Bronze Nights, but had to yield the case to a "more qualified" lawyer as the case moved toward the Supreme Court of Estonia.

Drambjan was divorced and had two daughters from the marriage. In 2011 he had run into financial difficulties and his apartment in Maardu was sold by court bailiffs.

== Political activity ==
Drambjan was a member of the Estonian United Left Party, a successor of the Estonian Communist Party. In the 2007 parliamentary elections in Estonia, he was a candidate for the Constitution Party. According to the Estonian Security Police, the Constitution Party was a puppet-party supported and controlled from Russia, created by the Russian Foreign Intelligence Service (SVR) in 2007 as part of their campaign of "political intelligence manipulations".

In the 2009 municipal elections, after the fusion of the Constitution Party with the Estonian Left Party he was a candidate for the newly formed Estonian United Left Party in the Russian dominated Maardu municipality, but failed to get elected. He was known as a fierce supporter of Maardu mayor Georgi Bõstrov.

During campaigning for the 2009 European Parliament election, Drambjan published a manifesto denouncing Estonia as a morally bankrupt neo-Fascist country, contending the Estonian government had chosen civil war in its relationship with the Russian minority and chastising the Russian community for its slavish mentality in the face of discrimination.
