= Tõnismägi =

Subdistrict of Tallinn, Estonia

Coordinates: 59°25′52.41″N 24°44′23.49″E

Tõnismäe
- Subdistrict of Tallinn
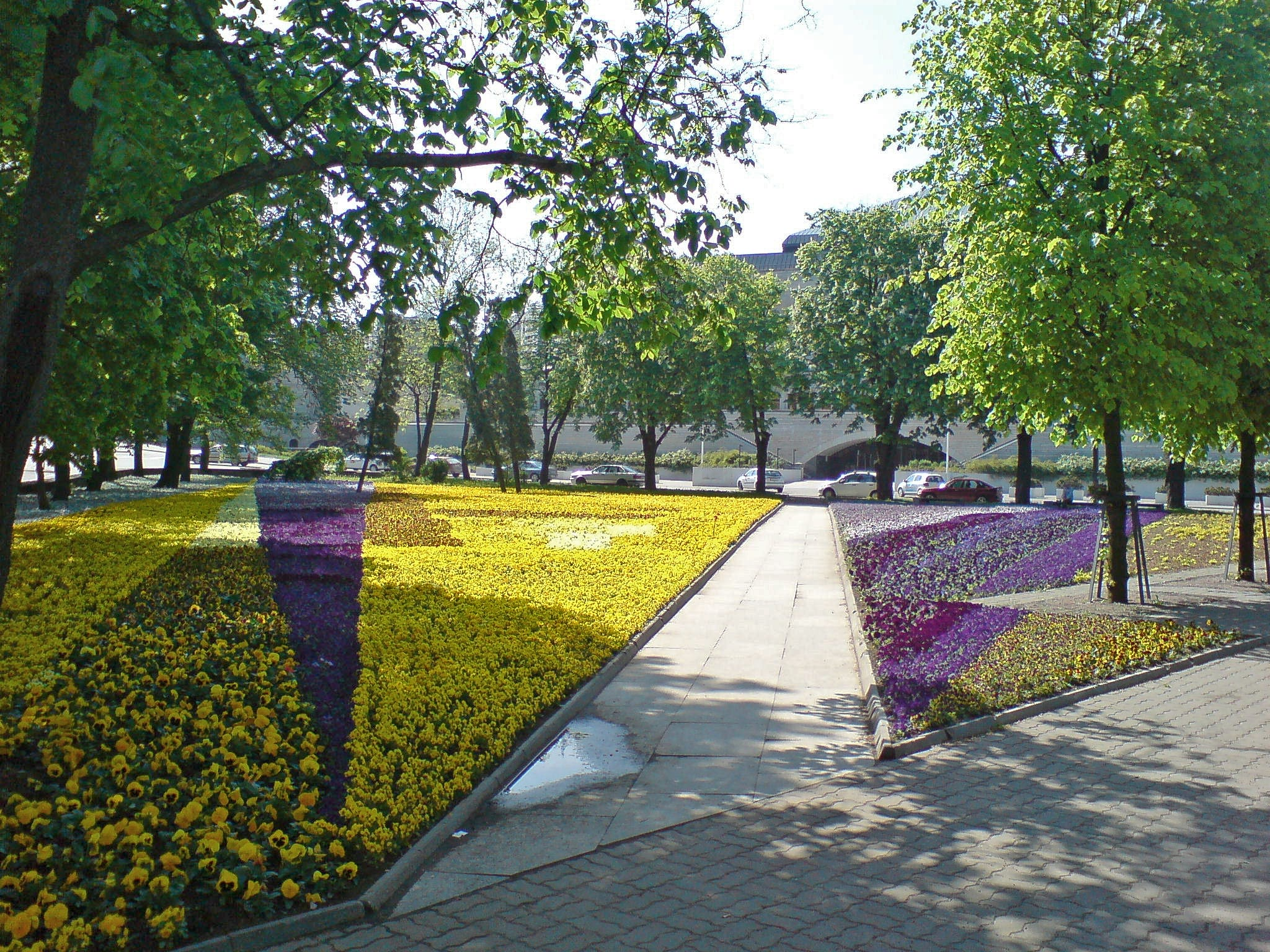
- Tõnismägi, May 2007

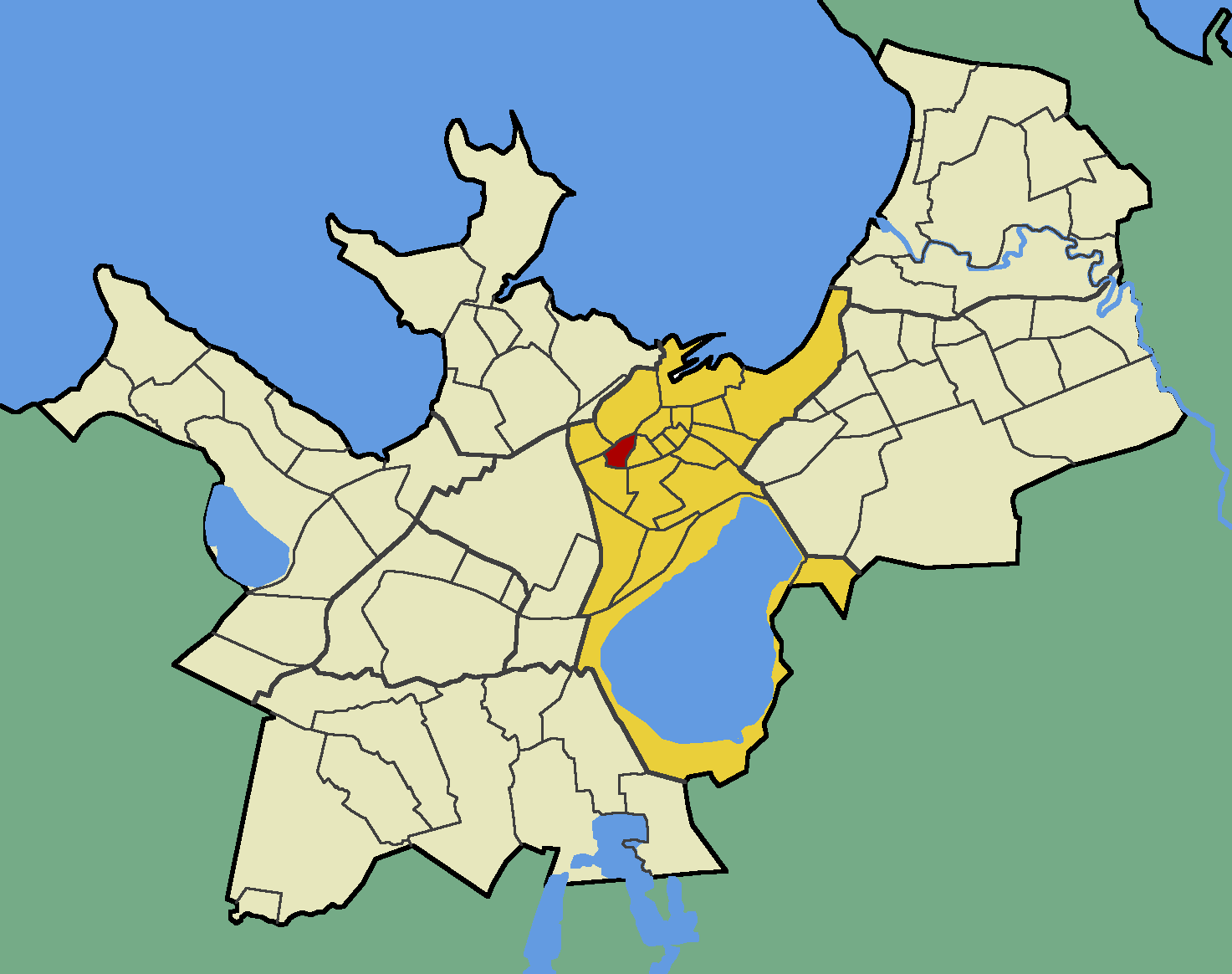
- Tõnismäe within the district of Kesklinn (Midtown).
- Country: Estonia
- County: Harju County
- City: Tallinn
- District: Kesklinn

Population (01.01.2014)
  - Total: 1,404

Tõnismägi (Estonian for "St. Anthony's Hill") is a 36-metre high hillock adjacent to Toompea hill in Tallinn, Estonia.

From 1945 to 1996 the central portion of the hillock was called Liberators' Square (Estonian: Vabastajate väljak). The place became internationally known in 2007 when the Estonian government relocated a Soviet war memorial known as the Bronze Soldier. Tõnismäe (genitive of Tõnismägi) is also a subdistrict (asum) in the district of Kesklinn (Town Centre) with a population of 1,404 (As of 1 January 2014).

== History ==
According to archaeological excavations, an oak forest grew on the hillock and its surrounding area in the first millennium. The hill has been dug lower several times during the centuries, thus leaving less material to be found by excavations, but some researchers believe that the area has been inhabited since the 12th or 13th century. First mention of Tõnismägi in writing is from 1348, when the town council of Tallinn gave the area to the Livonian Brothers of the Sword.

The history of Tõnismägi has always been related to religion. The oak forest was probably a sacred place for Estonians, but before year 1348, a chapel for St. Anthony was built on the hill, accompanied by a cemetery. The chapel and cemetery were probably destroyed around 1570–1571 or 1577 during the Livonian War. After the Livonian War several streets were built in the area.

In 1670, the first Kaarli Church (Charles's Church) was built here, named after the Swedish king Charles XI. The wooden church was for Estonians and local Finns. That church was burned down during the Great Northern War in August 1710. The short-lived second church was built in the 19th century, but was torn down when the third Kaarli church was built in 1870.

On 25 September 1944, remains of two Soviet soldiers were buried at the center of the hill. Additional remains were reburied there in April 1945. After the burial of the Red Army soldiers on Tõnismägi the square was named Liberators' Square on 12 June 1945. A memorial monument was ordered from architect Arnold Alas and unveiled on 22 September 1947, its central part being a bronze statue by sculptor Enn Roos. In 1964, an eternal flame was added. In April 2007, the statue was relocated from Tõnismägi to the cemetery of the Estonian Defence Forces and a reburial process initiated. (See Bronze Soldier of Tallinn.)

== Gallery ==
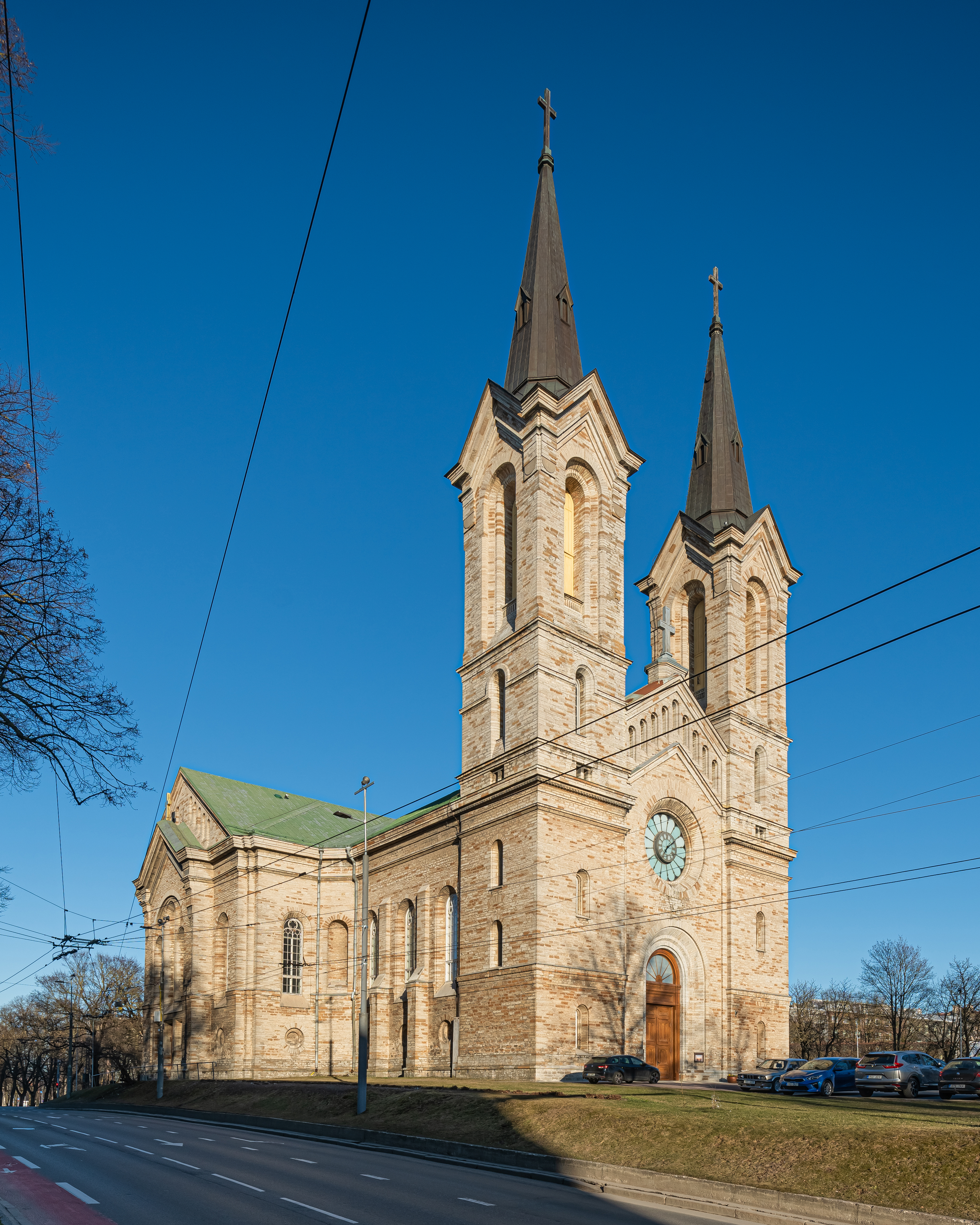
The third Kaarli church

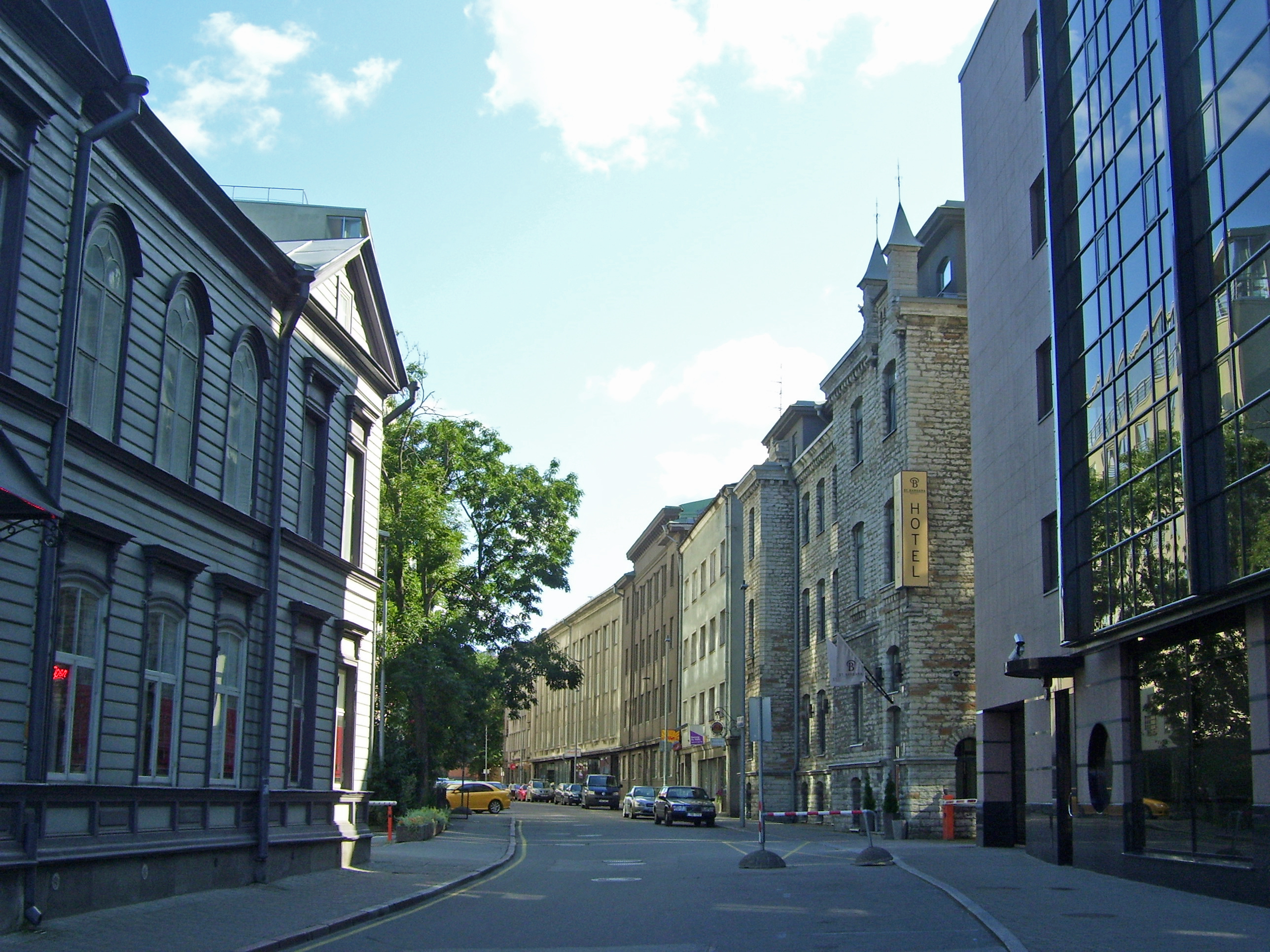
Roosikrantsi street

== See also ==
- Bronze Soldier of Tallinn
