= Sirok (disambiguation) =

Sirok is a village in Heves County, Hungary.

Sirok may also refer to:

- Mark Sirõk (born 1989), Russian-Estonian political activist
- Matija Širok (born 1991), Slovene footballer
