= K-Commando =

Special intervention unit in Estonia

- K-Komando
- K-Commando insignia
- Country: Estonia
- Agency: Police and Border Guard Board
- Type: Police tactical unit
- Operations jurisdiction: National
- Headquarters: Tallinn

Structure
- Operators: Classified

Commanders
- Current commander: Marek Aas
- Notable commanders: Lembit Kolk

Notables
- Significant operation(s): 2011 Estonian Ministry of Defence attack; Bronze Night riots (2007)

K-Commando (Estonian: K-Komando) is a police tactical unit of the Estonian Police and Border Guard Board (PBGB), created in 1991 to perform tasks requiring special training.

== History ==
=== Formation ===
The unit was founded in 1991 under the name Police Reserve Special Unit by Henn Kask.

The unit got its current name in 1993 after the group's commanding officer at that time, Lembit Kolk (retired).

== Training ==
K-Commando was originally trained by the FBI Special Weapons and Tactics Teams (FBI SWAT) in the United States, the German GSG 9 and the French's RAID, among others.

K-Commando is known for its fearsome reputation and high level of professionalism.

Recruitment involves rigorous testing and requires the approval of all current team members.

Only when a consensus has been reached will the candidate be accepted into the unit. As in other special police units, applicants must have a long service record.

== Duties ==
K-Commando operates under the command of the Central Criminal Police of Estonia (Estonian: Keskkriminaalpolitsei).

K-Commando's areas of activity include the apprehension of armed and dangerous criminals, hostage crisis management, counter-terrorism, and other tasks requiring special training.

The number of members of the unit has never been made public by the police and the identity of the members is classified. There are no known casualties thus far.

K-Commando is part of ATLAS, the European Union's network of special intervention units.

=== Known operations ===
- Bronze Night riot control
- Exchange of fire at the 2011 Estonian Ministry of Defence attack, the only operation to date to result in the death of a perpetrator.
- Arrest of Asso Kommer on 26 November 1993, when a firefight took place in Tallinn, during which Kommer wounded a policeman. On the same day, Kommer was taken into custody.
- Arrest of Raimi Puusepp on 13 May 1997, in Rapla County. Puusepp killed his eight-year-old son during the attack.
- Arrest of the Voitka brothers on 29 February 2000 in Viljandi County.
- Estonian-Russian football match on 27 March 2002 in Tallinn.

== Equipment ==
Model	Origin	Type	References
SIG Sauer P226	Germany	Semi-automatic pistol	
Heckler & Koch MP5	Germany	Submachine gun	
SIG 550	Switzerland	Assault rifle	
Heckler & Koch G36	Germany	Assault rifle	
Steyr AUG	Austria	Assault rifle	
SIG Sauer MCX	United States	Assault rifle	
