= Defence Forces Cemetery of Tallinn =

Cemetery in Tallinn, Estonia

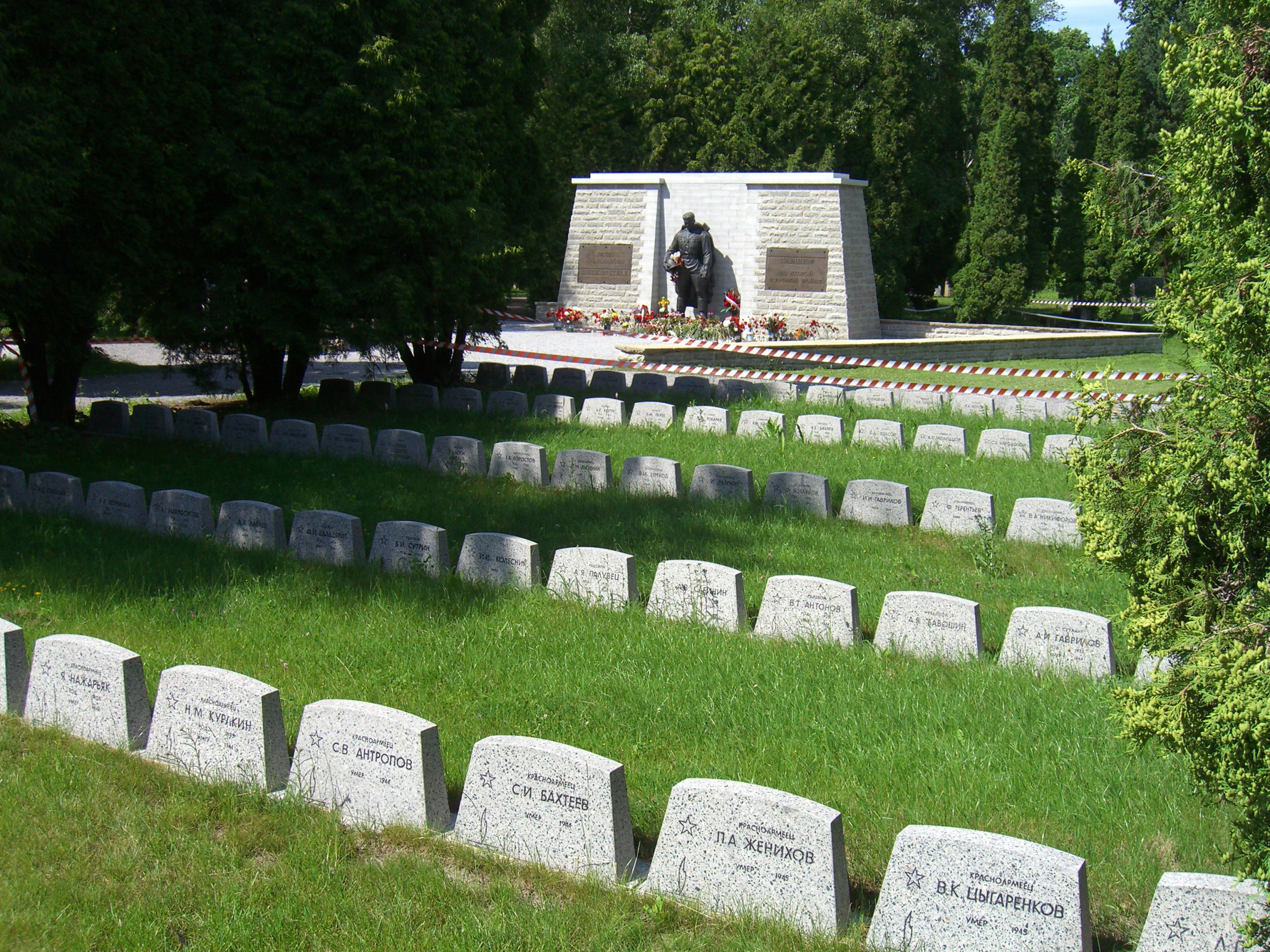
- The Bronze Soldier monument, "To those fallen in World War II", on the Defence Forces Cemetery of Tallinn (June 2007).
- Interactive map of Defence Forces Cemetery of Tallinn

Details
- Established: 1916
- Location: Tallinn
- Country: Estonia
- Coordinates: 59°25′18″N 24°45′56″E
- Type: Military
- No. of graves: 1,150

The Defence Forces Cemetery of Tallinn (Estonian: Tallinna Kaitseväe kalmistu), sometimes called the Tallinn Military Cemetery (Estonian: Tallinna Sõjaväekalmistu), is military cemetery in Tallinn. It is situated about 3 kilometres outside the centre of Tallinn, the capital of Estonia. During Estonian independence before the Soviet and German occupations of the 1940–1991 period, it was Estonia's foremost military cemetery.

== History ==
The cemetery was established at the end of the 19th century as the cemetery of the Imperial Russian garrison Tallinn. The oldest grave dates back to 1916 and holds Russian, Estonian, and German soldiers killed during World War I.

Also buried there are one British merchant seaman and four Royal Navy personnel from the same war who died before the Armistice, in addition to seven Royal Navy and two British Army personnel who died during the period of the Estonian War of Independence, and one non-world war grave. Eight of the Royal Navy personnel had been reburied here from Tallinn Old Cemetery.

The graves from 1918 to 1944, the gravestones of the Estonian soldiers and the monuments of the Estonian War of Independence were largely destroyed by the Soviet authorities and the graveyard was taken over by the Red Army for use by the Soviet occupation forces after World War II.

The graves of the fifteen British servicemen who died mostly in the Estonian War of Independence between 1918 and 1920 were repaired in 1994. Queen Elizabeth II appointed Linda Soomre an honorary Member of the Order of the British Empire (MBE) for dedication and bravery in protecting the British graves during the years of the Soviet rule. Soomre was in charge of the Tallinn City Centre Cemetery for 35 years. After the destruction of the gravestones she had made the ground overnight a maintenance area saving the remains of the British soldiers from being violated. The graves are in a curbed graveled plot 75 yards inside from the cemetery main gate, in two rows, but because their exact locations could not be marked each man has a Special Memorial headstone. The graves are maintained by the Commonwealth War Graves Commission.

Linda Soomre also saved the graves of two Estonian generals, Johan Unt and Ernst Põdder, by keeping the burial sites covered with dirt. The monument for the generals, originally unveiled in 1933, was restored on 22 February 1998.

On 28 November 2012 the monument to those fallen in the Estonian War of Independence, originally unveiled in 1933, was restored. The registration book of people buried at this cemetery between years 1918–1944, with over 1,150 names, is maintained in Tallinn city central archives.

The only graves from 1918 to 1944 that survived the Soviet era in the graveyard was a dolomite statue in commemoration of the victims of Männiku explosion from 15 June 1936.

In mid-1990s a headstone which reads "To the Unknown Soldier: 1941–1945" in Estonian and Russian was placed on the cemetery, financed by the Russian Embassy in Estonia.

A notable monument, "To those fallen in World War II", is the Bronze Soldier, a two-meter statue of a soldier in Red Army uniform with an accompanying stone structure. The statue was a part of a former Soviet World War II memorial by the sculptor Enn Roos and supervising architect Arnold Alas, and was moved from central Tallinn to the cemetery on 30 April 2007.

== See also ==
- List of cemeteries in Estonia
- Bronze Soldier of Tallinn
- Military of Estonia
