= Mark Sirõk =

Estonian activist

Mark Sirõk (Russian: Марк Сирык, born 12 March 1989) is a Russian-speaking Estonian political activist. He is designated as a commissar of the pro-Kremlin youth movement Nashi and a leader of the movement in Estonia.

== The Bronze Night in 2007 ==
Sirõk has mainly garnered attention in relation to the Bronze Night riots in Tallinn that left 150 people injured in April 2007. After the riots, he was arrested and together with Dmitri Linter, Dmitri Klenski and Maksim Reva later tried for inciting rioting. Among other evidence, investigation by the Estonian Internal Security Service had claimed that he had been organizing the "guard" near the Bronze Soldier by sending SMS's offering a pay of 80 Estonian kroons per hour, a rate somewhat higher than the average salary at that time, at several times higher than the minimum wage. The cash to be paid for the "guards" had been allegedly received from Russia.

All four were acquitted by the district court in January 2009, the ruling has upheld by Tallinn Court of Appeal in April, and the Supreme Court refused to review the case in July.

== Political views ==
In an interview with Eesti Ekspress, Sirõk has said he supports the constitution of Estonia and is not anti-Estonian. In particular, he highlighted his work in neutralising anti-Estonian sentiment, which he said was widespread among Nashi members. At the time of interview, Sirõk had not voted in any Estonian elections on account of his youth, but said he would likely vote for Keskerakond in future elections.

== See also ==
- Bronze Night
- Dmitri Linter
- Nochnoy Dozor (pressure group)
