= Voitka brothers =

Estonian freedom fighter

The Voitka brothers are Ülo Voitka (born 7 October 1968) and Aivar Voitka (born 17 March 1967). They were fugitives from 1986 to 2000. The brothers became fugitives on 27 March 1986, when they fled with Aavo Voitka from Soviet recruitment. Aavo Voitka and Aivar Voitka were eventually caught and punished, but Aivar managed to rejoin Ülo, and the two of them continued hiding until 2000, nine years after the Estonian restoration of independence. They were spotted and reported to the authorities by a local who saw them. When the police surrounded the brothers, the brothers opened fire in the direction of police, but they did not hit anyone. The tactical unit K-Commando was called in and, after negotiations, the brothers surrendered. The punishment of the brothers was controversial.

They have been compared to the Estonian Forest Brothers.

== Media about the Voitka brothers ==
- 2001: Ülo Russak, Ilveste impeerium (The Empire of the Lynxes), book
- 2004: V. O. I. T. K. A. metsavennad (V. O. I. T. K. A. Forest Brothers directed by Pekka Lehto), film
- 2007: David Baudemont, Deux frères (Two Brothers), play
