= Dmitri Linter =

Russian political activist

Dmitri Linter (Russian: Дмитрий Серге́евич Линтер; born November 22, 1973) is a counselor of the vice-director of the Russian Military Historical Society. He is also a pro-Kremlin political activist, who has worked as vice deputy of the Coordination Centre "Novorossiya" on human rights and humanitarian activities. He was one of leaders of the Nochnoy Dozor advocacy group that opposed the relocation of the Bronze Soldier of Tallinn memorial in 2007. In March 2014, Linter called for the formation of groups of volunteers to "correct holiday in the Crimea." In October 2014 Dmitri Linter acted as counselor and project manager during a visit to Riga of Russian Minister of Culture Vladimir Medinsky.

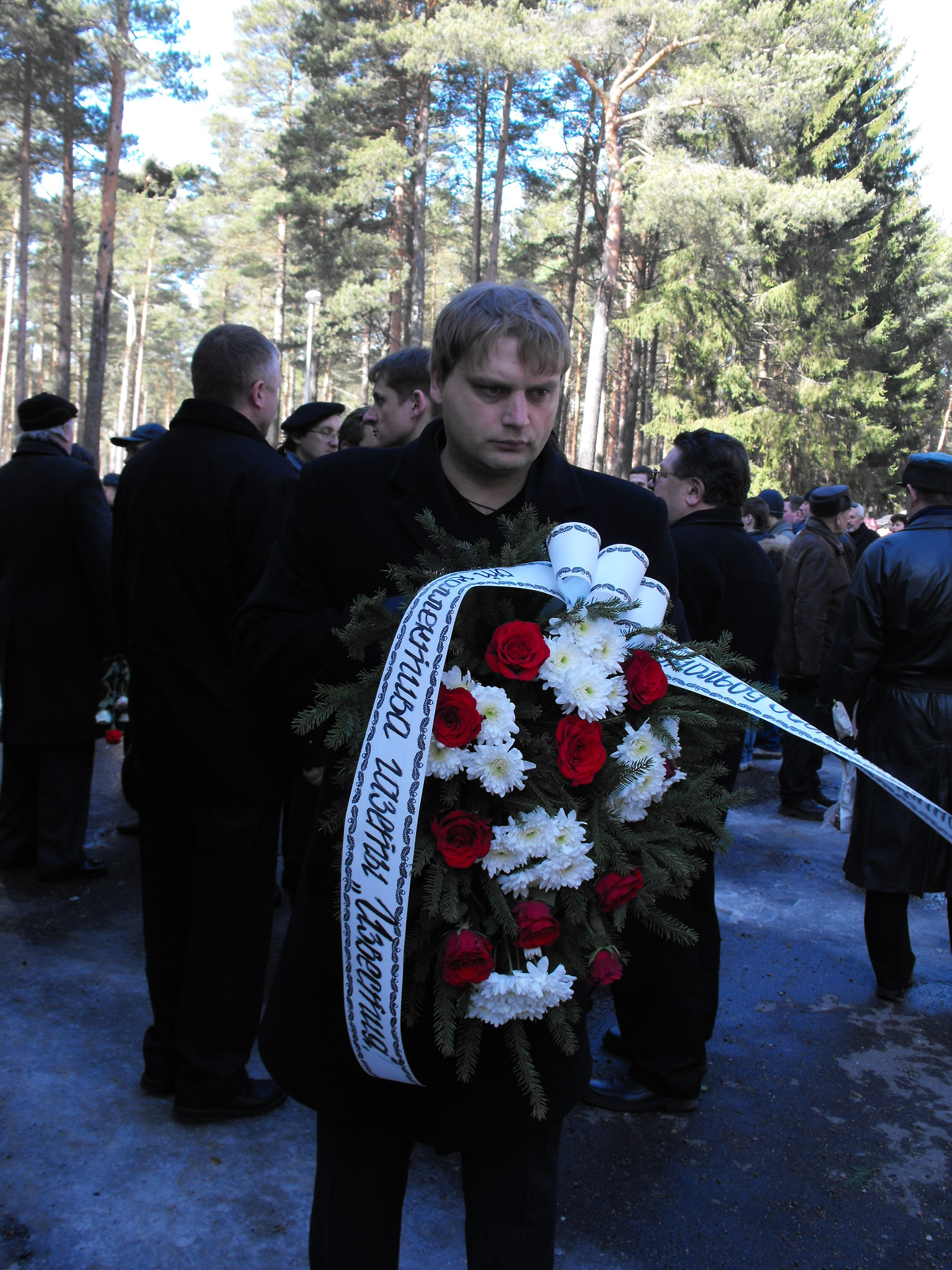
Dmitri Linter in 2009 at the funeral of Arnold Meri

== Biography ==
Linter was born on November 22, 1973, in Tallinn. Linter's mother is Leonora Linter. Linter's wife is Marina Linter.

== Political career ==
- In the European Parliament elections of 2004 he was a candidate of the "Russian Party in Estonia", and received 107 votes.
- In the parliamentary elections of Estonia in 2007, he was candidate of the Constitution Party, gathering a total of 122 votes.

== Arrest ==
On April 27, 2007, Dmitri Linter was arrested on charges of organizing mass riots. His wife, Marina Linter, has asserted the alibi that on the night of April 26 Dmitri Linter was at home "keeping multiple contacts with the press". Marina Linter claimed that despite all the pleas of his wife neither Linter's location nor his state of health were revealed. According to representatives of the prosecutor general's office of Estonia, it was part of an ordinary investigation. The content of the interrogation and the testimony are not made public in such cases in the interests of the investigation.

On November 16, 2007, after 7 months of imprisonment, Dmitri Linter and another leader of the Night Watch, Maxim Reva, were released on bail.

== Trial ==
On January 5, 2009, Dmitri Linter, charged with organization of riots during Bronze Night, was found not guilty by the District Court of Harjumaa.

== See also ==
- Johan Bäckman
- Russian influence operations in Estonia
- World Without Nazism
