= Enn Roos =

Estonian sculptor (1908–1990)

- Born: September 20, 1908; Tambov, Russian Empire
- Died: July 15, 1990 (aged 81); Tallinn, then part of Estonian SSR, Soviet Union
- Resting place: Metsakalmistu

Enn Roos (20 September 1908 – 15 July 1990) was an Estonian sculptor. He was a member of the Artists Society Pallas and a founding member of the Estonian Artists Association. Roos studied in the studios of Ants Laikmaa from 1926 to 1928 and Jaan Koort from 1927 to 1928. In 1935 he was accepted into the Pallas Art School where he was greatly influenced by Anton Starkopf. Roos was a long time professor in the State Art Institute of the Estonian SSR. From 1962 to 1977 he was the head of the department of sculpture.

Roos is known by his portrait, female nude and animal sculptures. Notable public works include Bear (1939) in the Hirvepark in Tallinn (1939), Lynx (1983) in Tallinn Zoo.

Roos' most known piece is the Monument to the Liberators of Tallinn (1947) commonly known as the Bronze Soldier Co-author architect Arnold Alas. In 2007 relocation of the statue from the center of Tallinn to the nearby military graveyard led to rioting and looting of Russian nationalists the so called Bronze Night and the 2007 cyberattacks on Estonia a wide spread cyber attacks against Estonian digital infrastructure. Although artistically unnotable it is remarkable among the Soviet war statues as instead of the common heroic posture it depicts a mourning soldier standing with his head looking down.
