= Bronze Night =

2007 ethnic violence in Tallinn, Estonia

Coordinates: 59.431256°N 24.740015°E

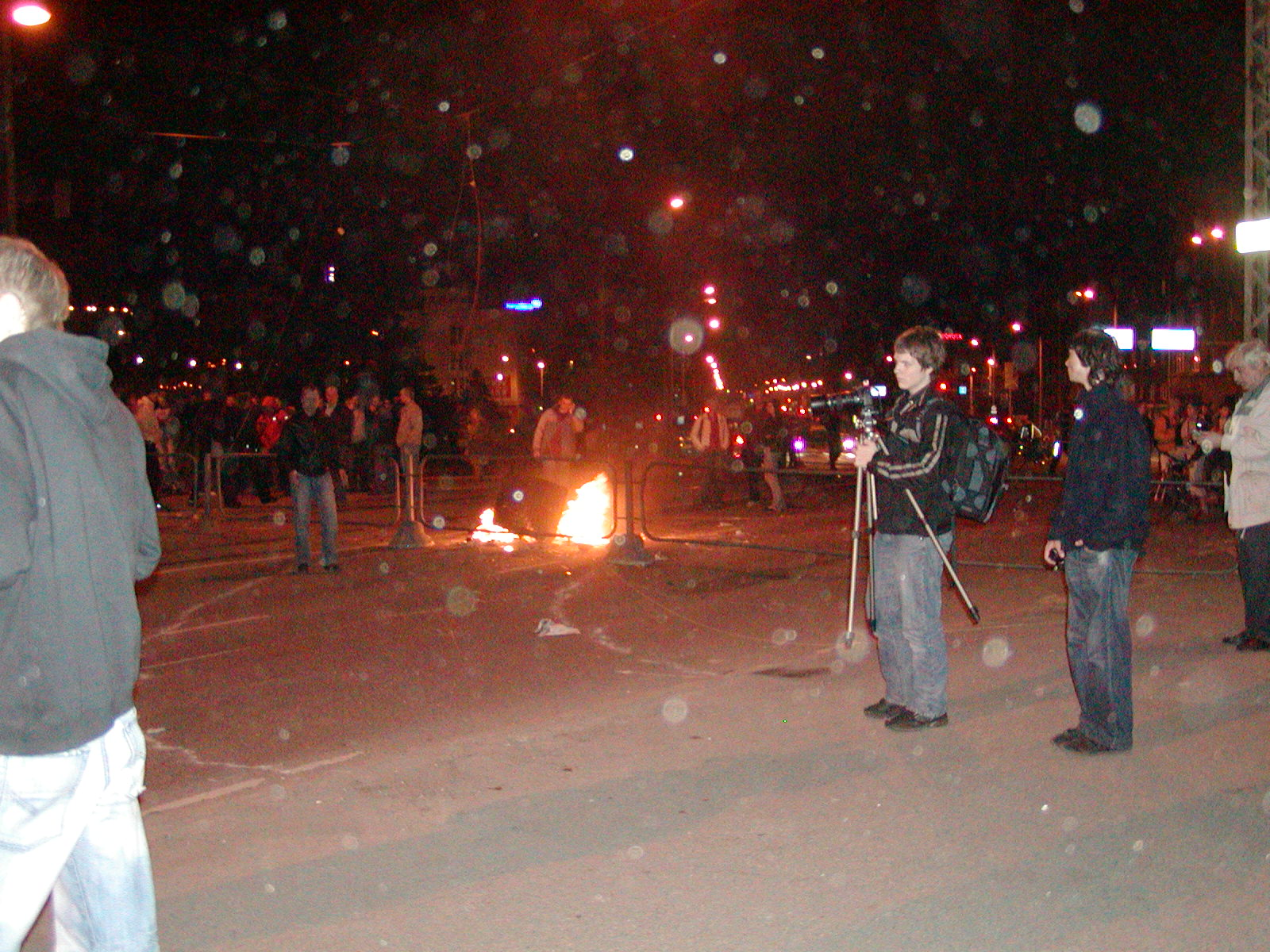
- Protests in downtown Tallinn after police cordoned off the streets around the memorial, driving protesters toward the city centre.
- Date: April 26 – April 29, 2007
- Location: Tallinn, Estonia
- Caused by: Relocation of the Soviet war memorial
- Goals: To stop relocation of the war memorial
- Methods: Widespread rioting, looting, assault, arson, protests, property damage
- Result: War memorial relocated to Defence Forces Cemetery of Tallinn

Parties
Ethnic Russian protestors: Night Watch	Estonian counter-protestors	Government of Estonia: Estonian Police

Casualties
- Death: 1
- Injuries: 171
- Arrested: 1,000+

The Bronze Night (Estonian: pronksiöö), also known as the April Unrest (aprillirahutused) and April Events (aprillisündmused), was a number of riots in Estonia surrounding the 2007 relocation of the Bronze Soldier of Tallinn, a Soviet World War II memorial in Tallinn.

Many ethnic Estonians considered the Bronze Soldier in the city centre a symbol of Soviet occupation and repression. At the same time, the monument has significant symbolic value to Estonia's large ethnic Russian community, symbolising not only Soviet victory over Nazi Germany in World War II, but also their claim to equal rights in Estonia.

Amid political controversy, in April 2007 the Government of Estonia started final preparations for the relocation of the statue and reburial of the associated remains, according to the political mandate received from the previous elections (held in March 2007). Disagreement over the appropriateness of the action led to mass protests and riots (accompanied by looting), lasting for two nights, the worst in Estonia since the Soviet reoccupation in 1944. During the riots, one ethnic Russian protester was fatally stabbed. In the early morning hours of April 27, 2007, after the first night's rioting, the Government of Estonia decided, at an emergency meeting, to relocate the monument immediately, referring to security concerns. By the following afternoon, the stone structure had been dismantled as well. As of the afternoon of April 30, the statue without the stone structure had been placed at the Defence Forces Cemetery of Tallinn. An opening ceremony for the relocated statue was held on May 8, VE Day. (Soviet Army veterans celebrate Victory Day a day later, on May 9.) During June 2007, the stone structure was rebuilt. Relatives have made claims to bodies of four of the war dead. Unclaimed remains were reburied at the military cemetery, next to the relocated monument, on July 3, 2007.

== Background ==
=== Historical background ===
On July 3, 1933, aggression was defined in a binding treaty signed at the Soviet Embassy in London by the USSR and The Republic of Estonia. Forms of aggression were defined: "A naval blockade of coasts or ports of another State; Invasion by armed forces of the territory of another State even without a declaration of war." On September 24, 1939, warships of the Red Navy appeared off Estonian ports and Soviet bombers began to patrol over Tallinn and the nearby countryside. On June 12, 1940, the order for a total military blockade on Estonia was given to the Soviet Baltic Fleet. On June 16, 1940, the Soviet Union invaded Estonia. The Soviet Union occupied and subsequently annexed Estonia, Latvia and Lithuania as Soviet republics in 1940.

After the German occupation of 1941–1944, Soviet forces reconquered Estonia in the autumn of 1944 and Estonia remained a part of the USSR until 1991. During this era, Soviet authorities removed and obliterated numerous historical Estonian monuments. Cemeteries that were destroyed by the authorities during the Soviet era in Estonia include Baltic German cemeteries established in 1774 Kopli cemetery, Mõigu cemetery and the oldest cemetery in Tallinn, from 16th century, Kalamaja cemetery. At the Tallinn Military Cemetery (where the Bronze Soldier was relocated in 2007) the graves of 240 Estonian soldiers from the Estonian War of Independence were reused by the Red Army. The monument for Estonia's independence was destroyed by the Soviet authorities. Only the graves of two Estonian generals and 15 British servicemen from the era were saved by making the ground a maintenance area.

=== Interpretation of history ===
In 1989, during perestroika, the era of reassessment of Soviet history in the USSR, the USSR condemned the 1939 secret protocol between Nazi Germany and itself that had led to the invasion and occupation of the three Baltic countries. The collapse of the Soviet Union led to the restoration of the Republic of Estonia's sovereignty (See History of Estonia: Regaining independence.) The mass deportations of ethnic Estonians during the Soviet era together with migration into Estonia from other parts of the Soviet Union had resulted in the share of ethnic Estonians in the country decreasing from 88% in 1934 to 62% in 1989. (See Demographics of Estonia.)

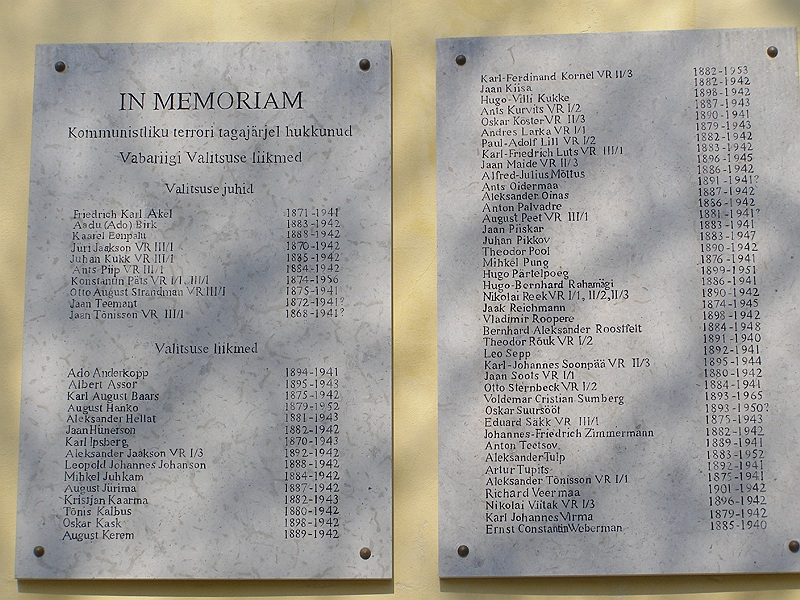
Plaque on the building of Government of Estonia, Toompea, commemorating government members killed by communist terror

According to the Government of Estonia, the European Court of Human Rights, the EU, and the US, Estonia remained occupied by the Soviet Union until restoration of its independence in 1991; the 48 years of Soviet occupation and annexation were never recognized as legal by the Western democracies.

According to the European Court of Human Rights, the lawful government of Estonia in 1940 was overthrown and Soviet rule was imposed by force. The government of the Soviet Union conducted large-scale and systematic actions against the Estonian population. Elections were organized in which only Soviet-supported candidates were permitted to run. As reported by Time magazine in 1940: "Those who had failed to have their passports stamped for voting Estonia into the USSR were allowed to be shot in the back of the head by Soviet tribunals."

The view that Estonia's annexation by the USSR was legitimate is advanced by the official statements of the Russian Federation, which claim that the USSR's presence in the Baltics was legal according to international law and that the Baltics could not be occupied because there was no declaration of war.

Some commentators fear that Russia's insistence on pro-Soviet historical interpretations may signal an attempt to reclaim control over the "near abroad".

Integration efforts in everyday life of Estonia have mainly revolved around two issues: citizenship and language. Some Russian associations, media, religious leaders and officials, as well as Amnesty International, accuse Estonia of human rights violations.

== Confrontation ==
After the restoration of Estonian independence in 1991, a public controversy surrounded the memorial and grew into direct confrontation about 2006–2007. The eternal flame was extinguished shortly after the Estonian redeclaration of independence. In 1994 the memorial underwent a reconstruction. Following the reopening, the bronze headstones on the stone background and the protective barrier surrounding the memorial were removed.

World War II Red Army veterans and representatives of the Russian-speaking population in Estonia have continued to gather at the monument on certain dates, celebrating May 9 (Victory Day) and September 22 ("Liberation of Tallinn" in 1944). The display of Soviet flags and other Soviet symbols at these gatherings had offended many Estonians.

A non-violent confrontation at the monument site took place on May 9, 2006, when a group of Estonians approached the celebrating Red Army veterans. To preserve public order and out of security concerns, the police helped the group to leave the area, along with their Estonian flag, and let the veterans' meeting with the Soviet symbols continue. On the next day, Estonian nationalist Jüri Liim said he would blow up the monument unless the authorities removed it promptly. In the same month, the tensions rose again and the police kept a 24-hour patrol in place, cordoning off the area until early September 2006.

Estonian journalist Paavo Kangur suggested in an opinion piece that the confrontations were intentionally provoked to increase the support of Union of Pro Patria and Res Publica and "Estonian Nazi sympathizers" of having been manipulated by Russian FSB service.

A small group of Estonian Russophones set up an organization in mid-2006 called Nochnoy Dozor (Night Watch), calling for nightly vigils to guard the monument from possible removal attempts.

On April 24, 2007, in explaining the necessity for thorough investigation of the burials, Estonian PM Andrus Ansip related a number of urban legends (grave holds remains of executed looters or drunk Red Army soldiers run over by Red Army tank). The Russian press sensationalized Ansip's comments in their headlines, presenting Ansip as disparaging Red Army veterans.

== Legislative preparations ==
=== War Graves Protection Act ===
On January 10, 2007, the Riigikogu (the Estonian parliament) passed the War Graves Protection Act, with 66 votes in favour and 6 against, initiated by the Estonian Reform Party, Social Democratic Party, Res Publica Party and Isamaaliit Party. The preamble of the Act states:

In observance and acknowledgement of the obligation of the Republic of Estonia to guarantee the protection, respect and dignified treatment of the remains of persons who have died in acts of war conducted on the territory of Estonia; finding that the burying of persons who have died in acts of war to unsuitable places is in discord with European culture and the tradition of honouring the memory and remains of the deceased; on the basis of Article 34 of the Protocol Additional to the Geneva Conventions of August 12, 1949, and relating to the Protection of Victims of International Armed Conflicts (Protocol 1) adopted on June 8, 1977, according to which the Estonian state is obliged to guarantee the respect of the remains and gravesites of persons who have died due to acts of war in the territory of Estonia, and the marking thereof, and in pursuance of which the Estonian state is entitled to rebury the remains on the basis of the public interest, the Riigikogu passes this Act.

The Act came into force on January 20, 2007.

Estonia has mutual war grave protection treaties with Finland and Germany but not with Russia, giving special status to many war graves in Estonia but not the one on Tõnismägi. The War Graves Protection Act's major result was to codify the international customs and practices regarding the handling of war graves (see above) into country-unspecific terms, and to extend unilateral protection to war graves not covered by mutual international protection treaties. Most 20th-century battles on Estonian soil having been fought by Soviet (largely ethnically-Russian), German, Estonian armies and a formation of the Finnish volunteers under Estonian command, almost all war graves in Estonia not covered by mutual treaties or earlier domestic laws are those of the Red Army.

Another effect of the law was that it placed all war graves under the jurisdiction of the Estonian Ministry of Defence. Tõnismägi being city land, municipal cooperation would have been necessary for exhumation and/or monument removal without such legislation. As non-citizen residents can vote in Estonian municipal elections and were largely in support of retaining the statue, the Tallinn City Council has a large Russian representation and any approval was unlikely in the foreseeable future. The law eliminated the need to negotiate with the municipal government for war grave related business—specifically, exhumation of the buried bodies and, if the corpses would be found, relocation of the monument which would then be considered a grave marker.

=== Proposed Law on Forbidden Structures ===
On February 15, 2007, Riigikogu approved the Law on Forbidden Structures by 46 votes to 44. This would have banned the public display of monuments that glorify the Soviet Union or Estonia's fifty years of Bolshevism. The monument itself was specifically mentioned, to be relocated within 30 days of the President signing this into law. However, President Toomas Hendrik Ilves vetoed the law, arguing that it did not comply with the constitution of Estonia (the only legal basis for a presidential veto under Estonian constitution). A veto override was never attempted and this bill did not become law.

== Public perception ==
The idea of relocation was opposed by a plurality among inhabitants of Estonia. According to an opinion poll ordered by Eesti Päevaleht and performed by Turu-uuringute AS from April 5 through April 22, 2007, 37% of respondents supported relocation of the monument, while 49% were against relocation and 14% had not formed any opinion on the subject. Relocation of the monument had slightly stronger support from native Estonian speakers—49% in favour of relocation—while only 9% of native Russian speakers supported relocation.

According to a non-scientific poll by the daily newspaper Postimees on April 25, when preparations for relocation had already begun, 85.12% of online readers taking part in the poll voiced their support for the relocation, 12.98% opposed it and the remaining were uncertain.

According to the article in Eesti Päevaleht, in Russia special services encouraged media to discuss the Bronze Soldier often and in a particularly emotional way, as a way of influencing political opinion. Among other activities, this translated into opposing and denouncing of high-level Russian politicians who supported civilised relocation of the Bronze Soldier.

== Events surrounding relocation ==
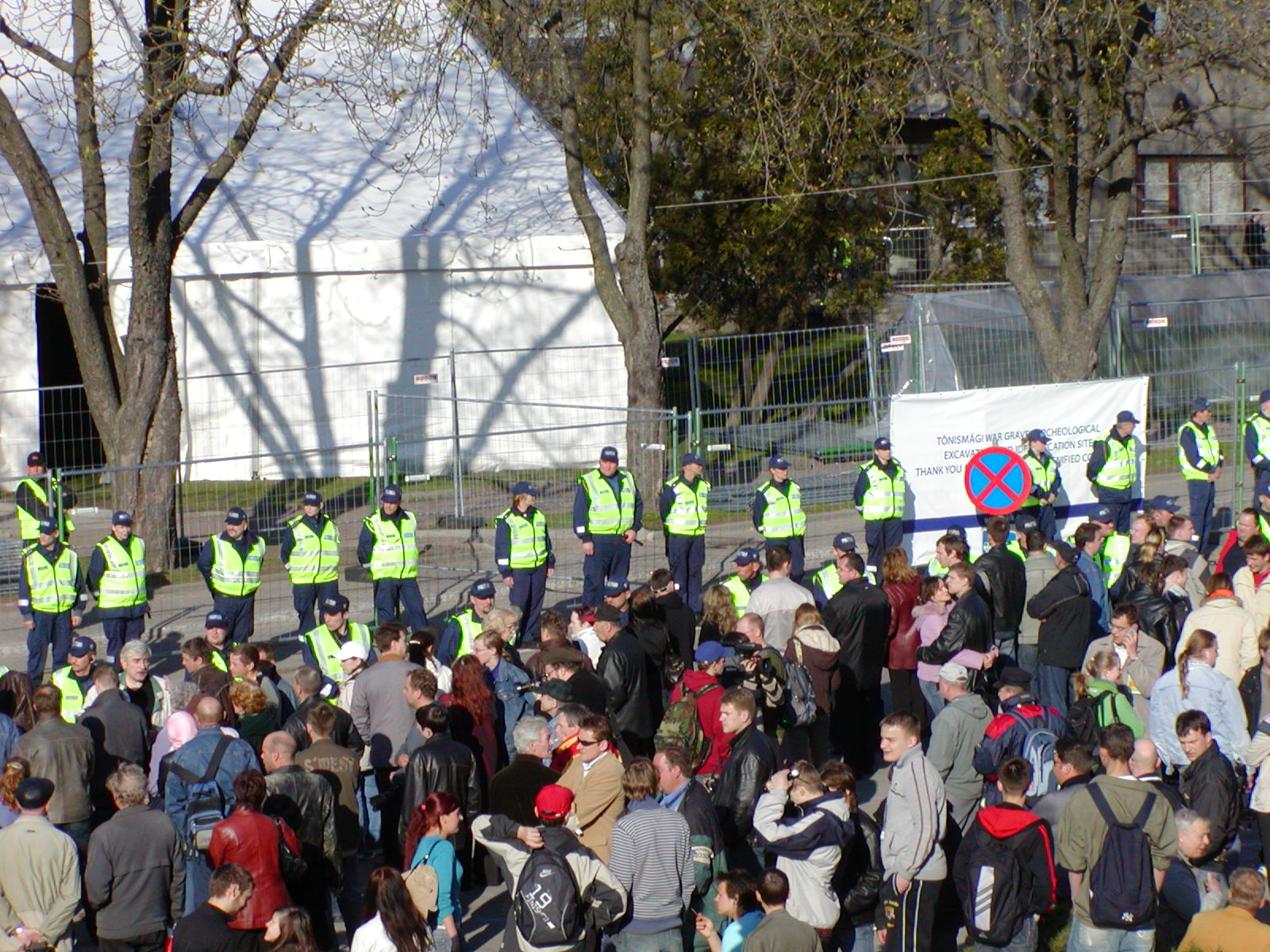
Police cordoning off the statue on April 26, 2007. The sign says "archeological excavation".

Estonian Police cordoned off the square and nearby streets in the early morning of April 26, 2007, in preparation for archaeological excavations in search of the remains and, if found, their relocation.

A tent structure was erected to shield the excavations from weather and from public view. Three members of the protest organization "Night Watch" (also sometimes translated as Night Vigil) who were monitoring the situation declined to leave the area and locked themselves in their car. The police had to break a side window of the car to extract them forcibly, causing slight shard wounds to one. Having been removed, Night Watch spread rumours that the monument removal procedure had started. After a few hours, around 1000 people, mostly Russian-speaking, had surrounded the police cordon and some from the group attempted to break through it. Several meetings in protest of the removal were held. Around dusk, the mob turned more and more violent, starting to throw stones and empty bottles at the police. By around 9:15 p.m., the mob activity turned to what the police considered the first night's riot.

In the early morning of April 27, 2007, the Estonian government held an emergency meeting and at 3:40 a.m. local time, decided, upon advice from the Estonian Security Council, to relocate the monument immediately (as "the ground for violent acts"). Three hours later, by 6:40 a.m., the monument had been moved to an undisclosed provisional location.

The government stated that the statue would be re-erected as soon as possible in a military cemetery maintained by the Estonian Defence Forces. As of the afternoon of April 30 the statue—without the stone structure—had been re-erected. Reassembling the stone structure was delayed out of concerns over the æsthetic qualities of the site on reopening, as the stone structure's weight required a new foundation to be constructed out of concrete. This work began on May 23 and was estimated to be completed by the end of June. For the time of the construction work, the statue was temporarily moved to a nearby location on the cemetery.

An ecumenical religious ceremony (prayer for the dead) was held on April 28 before commencing the exhumation, by two chaplains, a Lutheran and an Orthodox. The Russian ambassador, having been invited to monitor the exhumation, or appoint an observer, officially declined the invitation.

=== Riots and violence ===
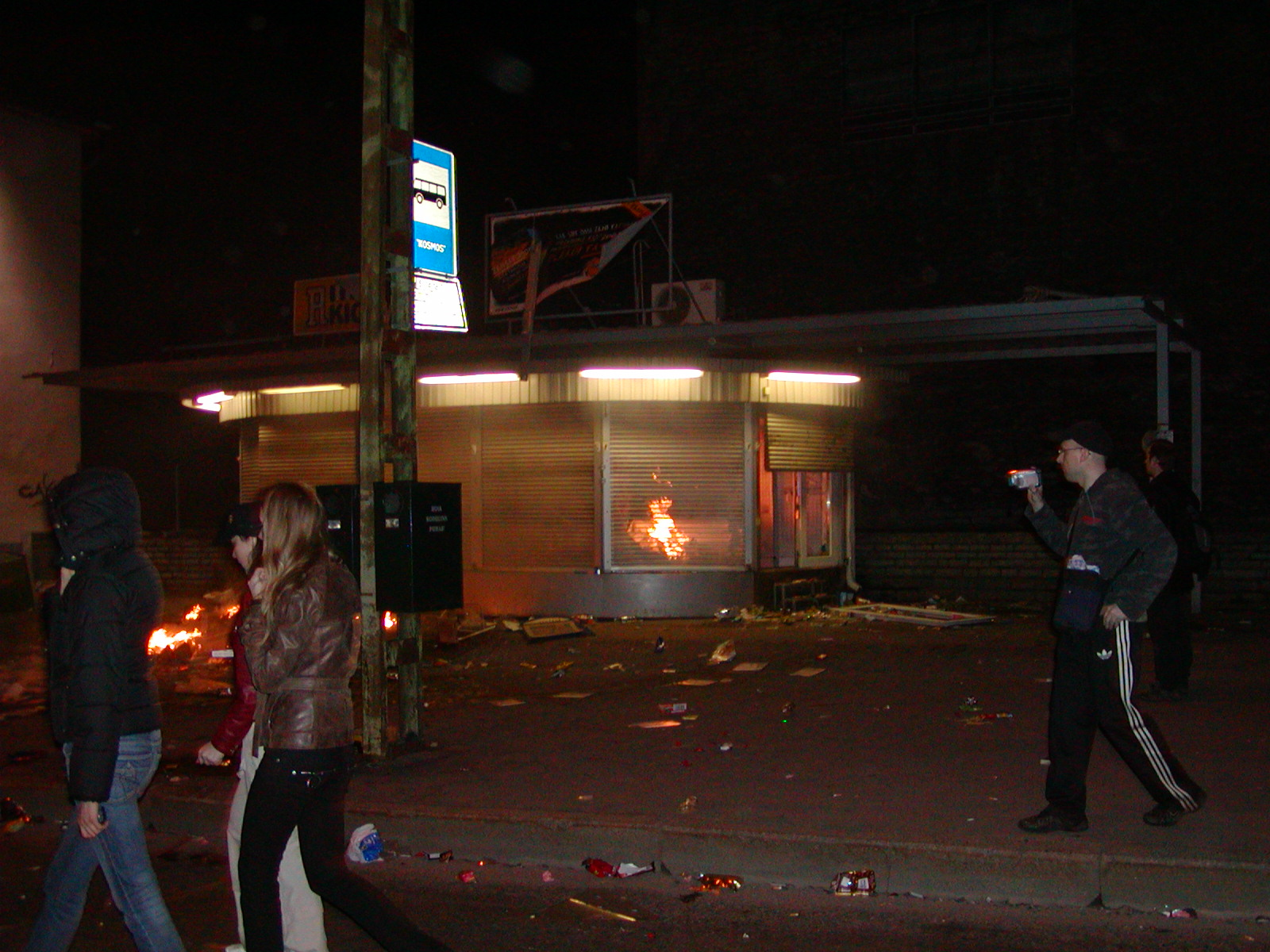
Burning kiosk, April 26, 2007.

==== April 26–27 ====
Estonia's authorities report that the violence started around 9:20 p.m. (EEST, UTC+3), as the protesters started to assault the policemen. Riot police responded by using water cannon and, according to BBC, firing tear gas to disperse the crowd. However, the crowd did not disperse and started committing acts of vandalism and rampant looting of nearby shops and buildings. By midnight the riots had spread around the centre of Tallinn, with massive damage to property—a total number of 99 cases of vandalism, including cars that had been turned upside down, broken and looted shop windows, pillaged bars and kiosks.

By 2 a.m., things had calmed down a little; over 100 people had been arrested. At about 2:30 a.m., reports came in that mass riots had ended and now the police were only looking for fugitives. The last of the violent protesters were apparently taken away by a large passenger bus. By morning 300 people had been arrested. 57 people were injured, including 14 police officers. Dmitry Ganin (a permanent resident of Estonia who had Russian citizenship) died in hospital from a stab wound. Estonian press alleged that wounds were likely inflicted by a vandal. As per September 2007, 13 mostly Estonian-speaking persons had been arrested by Estonian police on suspicion of beating but not stabbing of Dmitri Ganin; all had been subsequently released pending the end of the investigation. As of September 4, 2007, no charges had been laid. According to police report, goods stolen from some of the vandalised stores were found in pockets of Mr. Ganin.

Tallinn City Council suspended all strong alcohol retail licenses inside the city borders for a week. There were concerns, mostly in foreign media, that the protest could have escalated into an ethnic conflict between Estonians and members of the ethnic Russian minority.

==== April 27 ====
The night of April 27 saw a recurrence of violence, with a second night of rioting. Rioting and looting in a few towns of North East Estonia (mainly Jõhvi) with a Russian majority, were also reported. Estonian sources attributed the disruptions to youths consuming stolen alcohol. In all, some 1000 people were detained in two nights of rioting. 156 were injured, including some two dozen police officers, and numerous stores, offices and homes were damaged. As there had been too many arrests for the normal pre-trial detention centers, many suspects were taken to a hastily set up holding area in the Terminal D of the Tallinn Seaport.

==== April 28–29 ====
Calm was restored throughout the day and night of April 28 without further major incidents, but police launched a campaign to take on "police assistance" volunteers, and by Sunday evening more than 700 persons had signed up and started training.

On April 28 a declaration by a self-named "Army of Russian Resistance Kolyvan" started circulating in Russian language Internet forums. The declaration called for "all Russian men living in Estonia" to take up arms. It demanded that Estonian citizenship be granted to all Estonian residents by May 3, threatening to start an armed resistance on May 9. At this time, it is not clear whether this group is the one described by the KavkazCenter report (see above) or is a copycat inspired by it.

==== April 30 ====
No major incidents were reported, but some drivers tried to block the traffic in the center of Tallinn by intentionally driving at a slow speed and excessively using their car horns.

The Union of the Peoples of Estonia (Eestimaa Rahvuste Ühendus, an association of minority ethnicities living in Estonia) published a declaration that day, condemning vandalism and maraudery.

A Russian State Duma delegation led by the former FSB Director Nikolay Kovalyov also arrived in Estonia, in what was described as a "fact-finding mission". While still in Russia, the chairman of the delegation had already made a declaration, asking Estonia's government (led by Andrus Ansip) to step down. Sven Mikser, leader of the foreign affairs' commission of the Riigikogu, who was one of the Estonian politicians to meet the Russian delegation, expressed his regret that the Russians had come with prejudices and had intervened in Estonia's internal affairs (e.g. by calling for Estonia's government to resign). Later in the day, the reappearance of the bronze soldier threw the Duma's fact finding mission off-course, with delegation leader Kovalyov saying that he had not been invited by the Estonian authorities to the ceremony at the military cemetery.

There were some voices that called for cabinet resignation among the Estonian public as well. The most aggressive criticism was made by members of the Center Party, who had been left out of the coalition talks during the then-recent elections.

==== May 1 ====
The Russian State Duma delegation visited the new location of the statue, placed flowers and a wreath (a common symbol of remembrance of the dead in both Estonian and Northern Russian cultures) in front of the bronze soldier. The delegation members also closely examined the figure and claimed that it had been cut in pieces and reassembled. The Ministry of Defence denied those claims. "The lines on the statue are because of bronze casting technology and from the time the statue was created," said the press representative of Estonian Ministry of Defence. Statues of that kind are made in several pieces and later assembled in one.

Estonia's Foreign Minister Urmas Paet said that the European Union has promised to help end a siege at the Estonian embassy in Moscow. For nine days, protesters in Moscow had disturbed the peace of the embassy, prevented staff and visitors from entering or leaving the embassy, and physically attacked the embassy and the ambassador. Paet had spoken to his German counterpart Frank-Walter Steinmeier who "promised speedy assistance from the European Union to normalise the situation around the Estonian embassy in Moscow." Germany then held the rotating presidency of the EU.

The two-day visit by the Russian fact finding delegation was ostensibly set up to defuse a diplomatic dispute over the Bronze Soldier statue, but it only appeared to have escalated the feud. After the initial developments during the delegation's visit, Foreign Minister Urmas Paet cancelled a meeting with the delegation, issuing a statement saying: "I will not meet with a delegation that spreads only lies regarding events in Estonia and whose objective is not the accurate portrayal of the situation, but rather election campaigning".

=== Epilogue ===
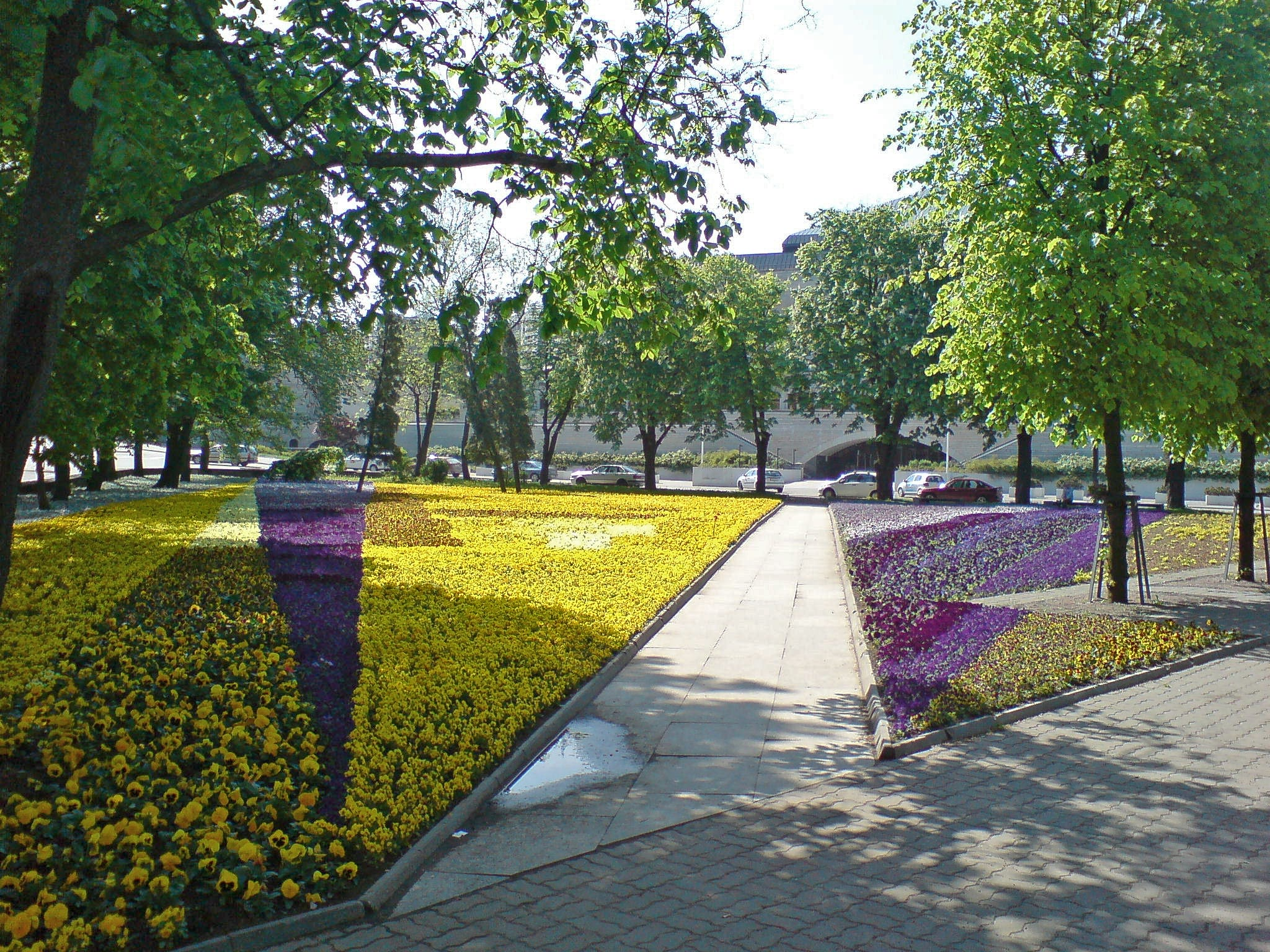
Tõnismägi, former site of the monument, May 27, 2007

Tõnismägi hill (the former site of the monument and of the now-empty burial site) being city property, the government's position is that it is the responsibility of Tallinn municipal government to decide what to do next with it. On May 9, it was reported that, as agreed with the City Park Office, the Ministry of Defence was planting an enormous flower garden on the site, as a part of the post-exhumation restoration work mandated by the War Graves Act. On June 8, 2007, the Ministry of Defence announced a plan to replace the flowerbed with a permanent park complete with small trees.

==== Bodies transferred to the relatives ====
On June 14, 2007, successfully identified remains of captain Bryantsev were handed over to his relatives for reburial in Rostov oblast, Russia. This was the first of the twelve exhumed bodies to be returned to relatives.

As of July 3, 2007, three remains had been released to their relatives. Claims regarding a fourth, Master Sergeant Stepan Hapikalo, are pending arrival of his relatives, currently living in Ukraine, to Estonia for DNA analysis. The eight bodies so far unclaimed were reburied next to the new location of the monument on that day.

On July 4, 2007, remains of Yelena Varshavskaya were reburied at the Mount of Olives in Jerusalem in the world's oldest Jewish cemetery. The reburial was conducted by Russia's Chief Rabbi Berel Lazar.

==== Reburial of unclaimed bodies ====
Eight of the exhumed remains—those unclaimed so far—were reburied at the military cemetery, next to the relocated monument, on July 3, 2007, in presence of the Estonian minister of defence, other officials, and dozens of diplomats, as well as various press representatives. A military attaché of the Russian embassy, Aleksandr Trojan, was reported as observing the event from the crowd. The Russian ambassador to Estonia, Nikolay Uspensky, declined invitation to attend, as an expression of Russia's highest-level disapproval of "demounting the monument, the exhumation, and the accompanying attempts to revise history to suit political conjuncture". However, he attended a religious memorial service for the fallen, held by the head of the Estonian Orthodox Church of Moscow Patriarchate, three hours after the reburial.

==== Syssoyev's daughters' lawsuit ====
Ezmiralda Menshikova and Svetlana Gnevasheva, daughters of Ivan Syssoyev, a Red Army partorg who died in Tallinn in 1944, filed suit against the government demanding that the Bronze Soldier be returned to its original location near the National Library as a grave marker. However, both the trial court and the appellate court found that since there is no evidence of Syssoyev having been buried at the site, his daughters lack legal standing to sue in this matter, and therefore rejected the demands. On January 20, 2009, the Supreme Court of Estonia denied certiorari in the case, leaving standing the lower courts' rulings and finalising dismissal of the lawsuit.

== Trial of alleged organisers ==
D. Linter, D. Klenski, M. Sirõk and M. Reva were accused of organizing the riots. International freedom of expression NGO ARTICLE 19 has called for them to be acquitted.

On December 11, 2008, the trial of men charged with organising of the riots ended; most of the last day was spent on delivering a lengthy judgement.

On January 5, 2009, the Harju County Court found not guilty (according to Postimees, under principle of in dubio pro reo, according to LICHR, "concluding that the evidence proved only one fact—that mass riots did take place in the downtown Tallinn on April 26–28, 2007") four men accused of organization of riots during Bronze Night riots.

The prosecutor appealed the decision. The acquittal, however, was upheld.

In 2009, The Estonian government passed the law nicknamed "Bronze Night law", that reinforces the penalties and improves and refines the laws relating to the distribution of national secrets, actions against the state, actions of promoting against the state and encourage or participate in riots.

== Human rights issues concerning arrests and use of force by the police ==
In November 2007, the UN Committee Against Torture has considered Estonia's report and expressed concern over "allegations of brutality and excessive use of force by law enforcement personnel, especially with regard to the disturbances that occurred in Tallinn in April 2007, well documented by a detailed compilation of complaints". In 2013, the same committee noted that it was "concerned at information that no prosecutions resulted from official applications to the Chancellor of Justice or the Public Prosecutor’s Office in relation to allegations of brutality and excessive use of force by law enforcement personnel during the events which took place in Tallinn in April 2007" (Para. 11).

In March 2013, the European Court of Human Rights decided that Estonian authorities had violated Article 3 of the European Convention on Human Rights (prohibition of torture, inhuman and degrading treatment) in respect of four people detained during the events.

In 2011, the Committee for the Prevention of Torture (Council of Europe) has published its report on its 2007 visit to Estonia, stating that many of the persons detained by the police in connection with the April 2007 events in Tallinn were not granted all the fundamental safeguards (the right of those concerned to inform a close relative or another third party of their choice of their situation, the right of access to a lawyer, and the right of access to a doctor) from the outset of their detention: while many of the persons concerned were allowed to contact someone and to be assisted by a lawyer only when brought before a judge, a number of detained persons claimed that their requests to see a doctor whilst in police custody had been denied, even when they displayed visible injuries.

== See also ==
- 2007 cyberattacks on Estonia
- Aftermath of the Bronze Night
- Estonian Patriotic Movement
- Foreign Intelligence Service (Russia)
- History of Estonia
- Latvian Riflemen
- Monument of Lihula, another controversial monument in Estonia
- Russians in the Baltic states
