= Nochnoy Dozor (group) =

Russian nationalist organization in Estonia

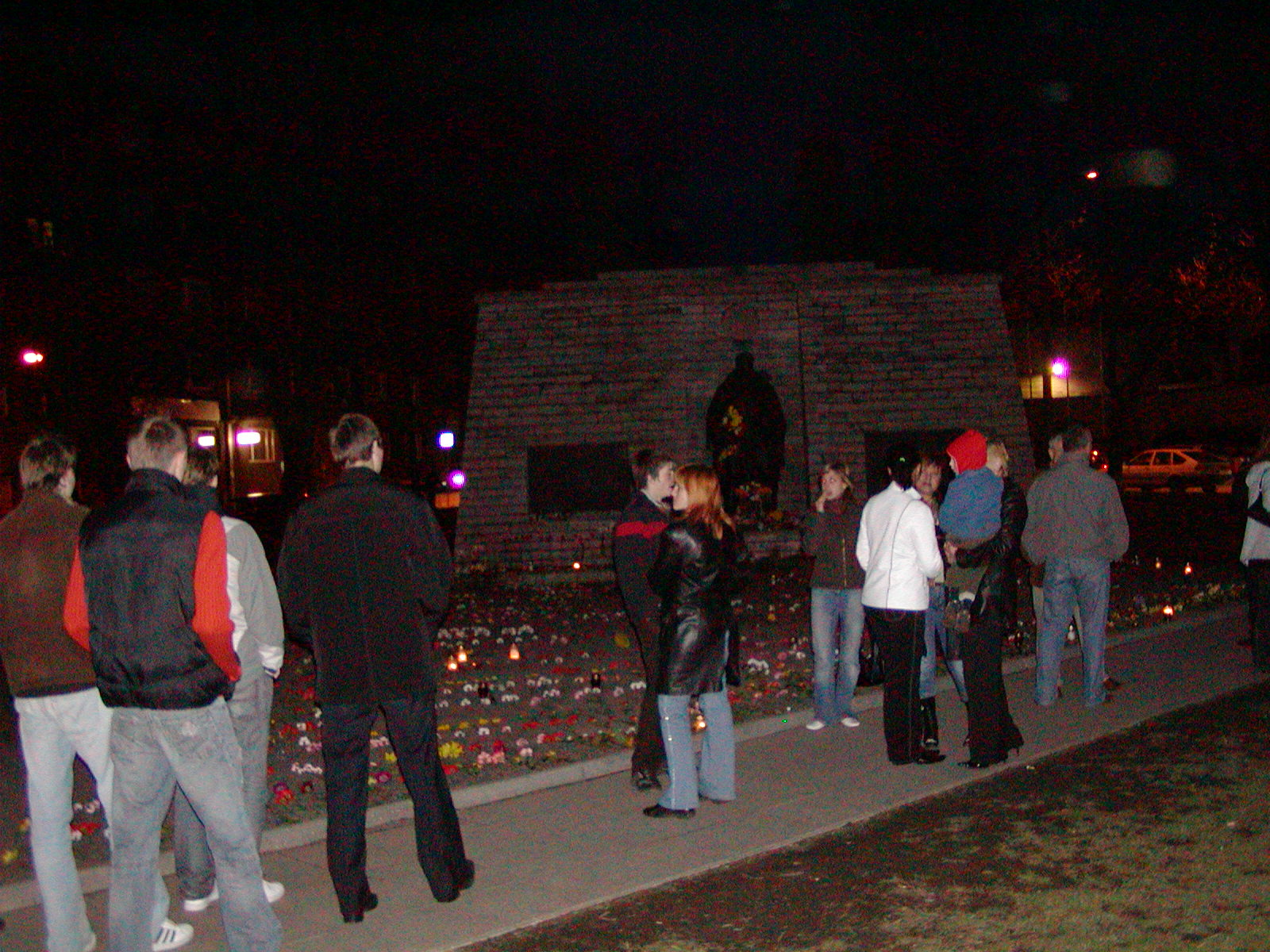
Night Watch supporters on vigil at the Bronze Soldier of Tallinn one day before its removal by Estonian officials

Nochnoy Dozor (Russian: Ночной дозор, lit. 'Night Watch', Estonian: Öine Vahtkond) is a group of mostly Russophone political activists living in Estonia. It was set up in the middle of 2006, with its original declared goal of defending the Bronze Soldier, a monument grave marker in Tallinn, near the Estonian National Library and next to a trolleybus stop, against "defacing, relocation and exhumation".

== Media savvy ==
The group has made several anti-governmental statements and are said to be supported by the Russian Foreign Ministry. Nochnoy Dozor refers to itself as an anti-fascist organization.

The group has made a number of public statements dubbing various Estonian politicians as Nazis and calling for their resignation. These statements are often rapidly taken up by Russian language media channels. Following the relocation of the Bronze Soldier of Tallinn in April 2007, the group called for the resignation of the whole Estonian cabinet of ministers. According to an article in the Estonian Postimees, during July 2007 the group was instrumental in constructing a controversy over the 50th birthday party of Rein Lang, Estonian Minister of Justice; Nochnoy Dozor was involved in calling for Lang's resignation.

The group is also semi-humorously referred to as Nochnoy Pozor (Night Shame) after its well-recognized chant of Pozor! Pozor! (Russian for Shame! Shame!) in the course of the day preceding the Bronze Night.

== Devaluation panic affair ==
On November 25, 2007, the group's website republished, with a title "business training" and a link to the forum disbunking the hoax, wrong information about the supposed secret devaluation of the Estonian kroon. The Security Police started an investigation of the matter. The accusation is based on a message published at organization's message board that originated from the portal Arif where it appeared under the header "Business training. This is a game scenario". Later, after speculation in local media and blogs mentioning Nochnoy Dozor's forum as a source, a link to Arif's website was added on Nochnoy Dozor's forum and a message describing the news post as a game appeared.

=== "Singling out" subcontroversy ===
The Russian news portal Newsru.com incorrectly reported that the press secretary of the Security Police told the media that the organization singled out Nochnoy Dozor because of this organization's connections to Russia. Newsru quoted him as saying that while there was no ground for the criminal investigation, the investigation can continue on different grounds.

This report turned out to be a fabrication; the press release contains no mention of "singling out" Nochnoy Dozor nor the supposed plans to continue an official criminal investigation.

== See also ==
- Dmitri Linter
- Mark Sirők
