= Arnold Alas =

Estonian architect & artist (1911–1990)

Arnold Alas (known as Arnold Hoffart until 1939; 1 July 1911 – 20 April 1990) was an Estonian landscape architect and artist.

Alas was born in Tapa, and died, aged 78, in Tallinn. He is best known for his work on the World War II memorial ensemble in Tallinn, which is now widely referred to as the Bronze Soldier and includes a two-meter bronze statue (by Enn Roos) of a soldier in a Soviet uniform and an accompanying monumental stone structure. The memorial was relocated amid controversy in April 2007 to the Defence Forces Cemetery in Tallinn, Estonia.

He was awarded the State Prize of the Estonian SSR in 1947 and 1948.
