= Bronze Soldier of Tallinn =

Controversial Soviet World War II memorial in Tallinn, Estonia

Coordinates: 59°25′17.99″N 24°45′55.67″E

The Bronze Soldier (Estonian: Pronkssõdur, Russian: Бронзовый солдат, romanized: Bronzovyy soldat) is the informal name of a controversial Soviet World War II war memorial in Tallinn, Estonia, built at the site of several war graves, which were relocated to the nearby Tallinn Military Cemetery in 2007. It was originally named "Monument to the Liberators of Tallinn" (Estonian: Tallinna vabastajate monument, Russian: Монумент освободителям Таллина, romanized: Monument osvoboditelyam Tallina), was later titled to its current official name "Monument to the Fallen in the Second World War", and is sometimes called Alyosha, or Tõnismäe monument after its old location. The memorial was unveiled on 22 September 1947, three years after the Red Army reached Tallinn on 22 September 1944 during World War II.

The monument consists of a stonewall structure made of dolomite and a two-metre (6.5 ft) bronze statue of a soldier in a World War II-era Red Army military uniform. It was originally located in a small park (during the Soviet years called the Liberators' Square) on Tõnismägi in central Tallinn, above a small burial site of Soviet soldiers' remains, reburied in April 1945.

In April 2007, the Estonian government relocated the Bronze Soldier and, after their exhumation and identification, the remains of the Soviet soldiers, to the Defence Forces Cemetery of Tallinn. Not all remains were reburied there, as relatives were given a chance to claim them, and several bodies were reburied in various locations in the former Soviet Union according to the wishes of the relatives.

Political differences over the interpretation of the events of the war symbolised by the monument had already led to a controversy between Estonia's community of polyethnic Russophone post-World War II immigrants and Estonians, as well as between Russia and Estonia. The disputes surrounding the relocation peaked with two nights of riots in Tallinn (known as the Bronze Night), besieging of the Estonian embassy in Moscow for a week, and cyberattacks on Estonian organizations. The events caught international attention and led to a multitude of political reactions.

== Background ==
The monument was originally erected by Soviet authorities in Estonia to the liberators of Tallinn who entered the city on 22 September 1944. German Army units in the city retreated rather than seeking to defend it. Instead, the National Committee of the Republic of Estonia attempted to re-establish Estonian independence by taking power in Tallinn, and by proclaiming Provisional Government of Estonia and declaring re-establishment of the country's independence on 18 September 1944. By the time the Red Army entered Tallinn, they were entering an already-empty city with an independent government, hence occupying Tallinn.

The Bronze Soldier monument replaced a preceding wooden memorial – a one-metre-high, wooden pyramid, about 20 cm in diameter, of a plain blue color crowned by a red star – that had been blown up on the night of 8 May 1946 by two Estonian teenagers. The two girls, 14-year-old Aili Jürgenson and 15-year-old Ageeda Paavel destroyed it, in their own words, to avenge the Soviet destruction of war memorials to the Estonian War of Independence. Both were later arrested by the NKVD and sent to the Gulag.

== Building and design ==
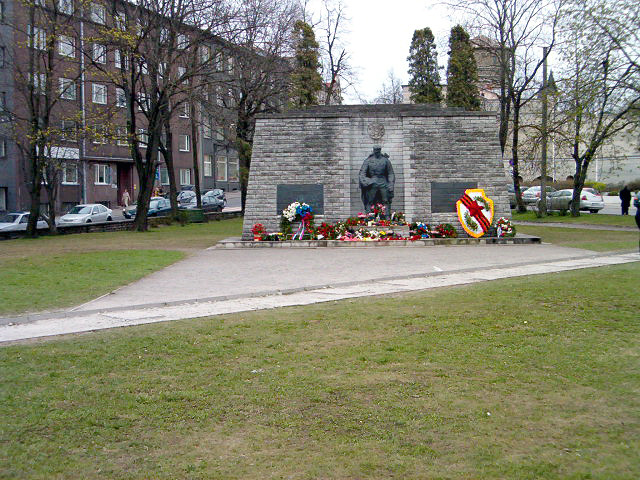
The monument in its original urban context

The Bronze Soldier monument, with its figure of a soldier against a stone background, was created in 1947 by Enn Roos and supervising architect Arnold Alas. It was unveiled on 22 September 1947, on the third anniversary of the Soviet Red Army re-entering Tallinn in 1944. Originally intended as an official war memorial to Soviet soldiers who died fighting in World War II, an eternal flame was added in front of the monument in 1964. The Soviet liberation theme was changed when Estonia re-established independence in 1991, now stating "For those fallen in World War II"; at the same time, the flame was extinguished.

=== Prototype ===
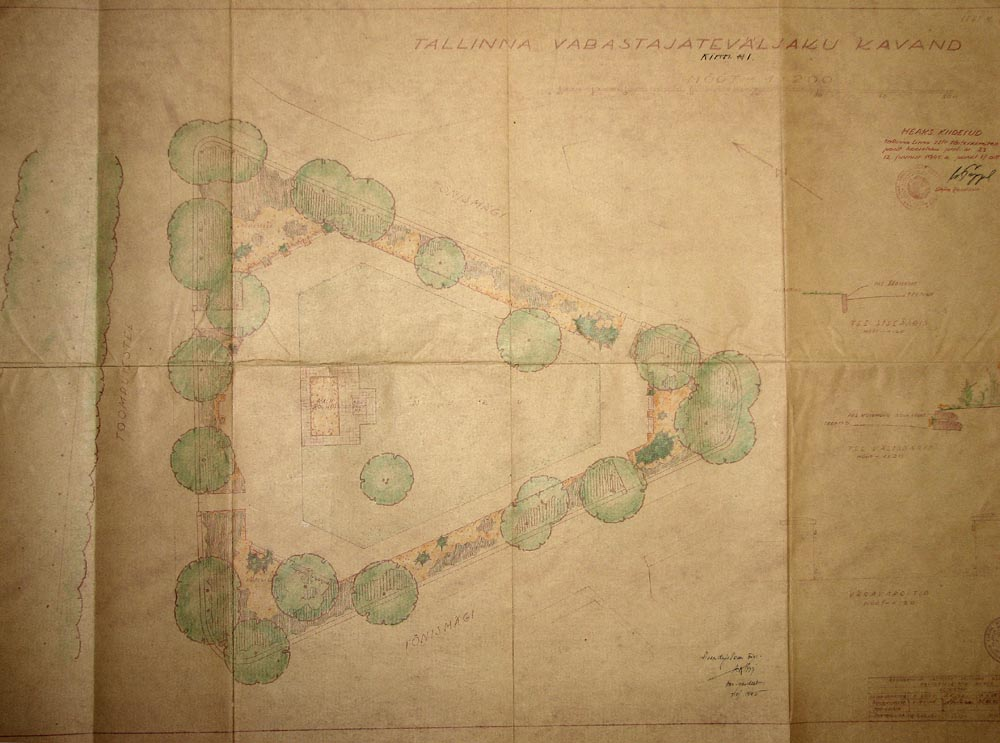
Map of the site

The prototype for the face and figure of the statue is not known. It has been suggested to have been the Estonian 1936 Olympic gold medal wrestler Kristjan Palusalu, as there is a resemblance. The sculptor Enn Roos denied this and instead suggested that he used "a young worker who lived nearby", and there have been claims the worker he is referring to was a carpenter named Albert Johannes Adamson.

On the other hand, Palusalu's daughter, Helle Palusalu, has claimed that her father served as a model for the statue. Roos's denial could have been motivated by Palusalu's having defected from the Soviet military and thus having fallen into disfavour with the Communist Party.

=== Burial site ===
On 25 September 1944, the remains of two Soviet soldiers were buried in the centre of the Tõnismägi hill, with additional remains of Soviet soldiers reburied there in April 1945. After the burial of the Red Army soldiers on Tõnismägi, the square was named Liberators' Square on 12 June 1945 with the Bronze Soldier Monument added two years later. The exact number and names of the persons buried in the burial grounds under the monument had not been established with certainty before the excavations of 2007, although the Estonian Ministry of Foreign Affairs had ordered a comprehensive historical investigation in 2006. According to official records of the Military Commissariat of the Baltic Military District, however, the following 13 soldiers who fell during World War II were reburied in the grounds in April 1945:

- Lieutenant Colonel Mikhail Kulikov (Михаил Петрович Куликов) — commander of the 657th regiment, born in 1909 in Morshansk, Tambov Oblast. Killed on 22 September 1944.
- Captain Ivan Sysoyev (Иван Михайлович Сысоев) — political commissar of the 657th regiment, born in 1909 in village Topsa, Arkhangelsk Oblast. Killed on 22 September 1944.
- Gefreiter (Senior Private) Dmitri Belov — 125th division (killed in a battle 45 km from Tallinn in September 1944)
- Colonel Konstantin Kolesnikov (Константин Павлович Колесников) — second commander of 125th division (killed on 21 September 1944 in a battle 45 km from Tallinn). Born in 1897 in Zhilaya Kosa, Stalingrad Oblast.
- Captain Ivan Serkov (Иван Степанович Серков) — chief of intelligence, 79th light artillery brigade (killed on 21 September 1944, in a battle 45 km from Tallinn). Born in 1922, Ryazan Oblast.
- Major Vasili Kuznetsov (Василий Иванович Кузнецов) — commander of 1222nd artillery regiment. Born in 1908 in Ivanovo Oblast. Killed on 22 September 1944.
- Lieutenant Vasili Volkov (Василий Егорович Волков) — commander of mortar platoon (125th division). Born in 1923 in Kalinin Oblast. Killed on 22 September 1944.
- Captain Aleksei Bryantsev (Алексей Матвеевич Брянцев) — 125th division. Born in 1917 in Altai Krai. Killed on 22 September 1944.
- Sergeant Stepan Hapikalo (Степан Илларионович Хапикало) — tank commander of the 26th tank regiment (according to official military sources died of a disease). Born in 1920 in Poltava Oblast. Died on 28 September 1944.
- First Sergeant, medic Yelena Varshavskaya (Елена Михайловна Варшавская) — division medical assistant of 40th Guard Mortars regiment (died 22 or 23 September 1944 in Tallinn). Born in 1925 in Poltava Oblast.
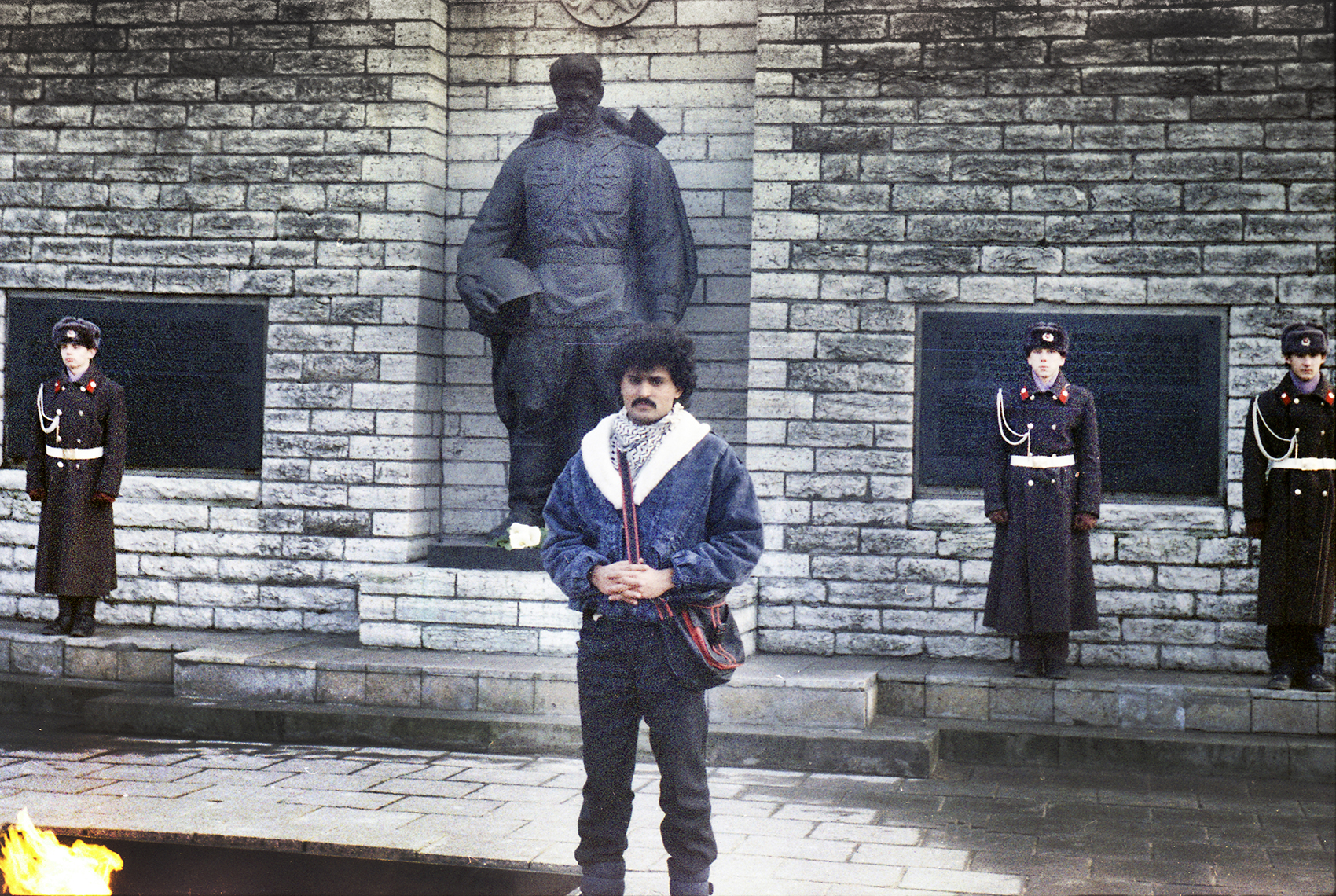
- A visitor to the monument in 1970, with the eternal flame and sentries
  Sergeant Aleksandr Grigorov – died 7 March 1945
- Lieutenant Colonel Kotelnikov – no information available
- Lieutenant I. Lukanov – no information available

According to the Estonian Ministry of Defence, the remains of 12 persons had been exhumed by 2 May 2007 and would be reburied by the end of June 2007 at the same cemetery where the statue had been relocated. Furthermore, the archaeologists performing the digs confirmed that no more burials have taken place on the grounds of the monument. The Russian embassy and other former USSR states were asked to provide DNA samples for the identification of the buried bodies. Those persons who can be identified were to be turned over to their relatives for reburial. The initial DNA analysis revealed 11 male and 1 female among those 12 found at the site. DNA profiles of all 12 were turned over to the embassy of the Russian Federation in Tallinn.

== Relocation ==
According to historian Alexander Daniel, the Bronze Soldier has symbolic value to Estonia's Russians, symbolising not only Soviet victory over Germany in the Great Patriotic War, but also their claim to rights in Estonia. Most Estonians considered the Bronze Soldier a symbol of Soviet occupation and repression following World War II.

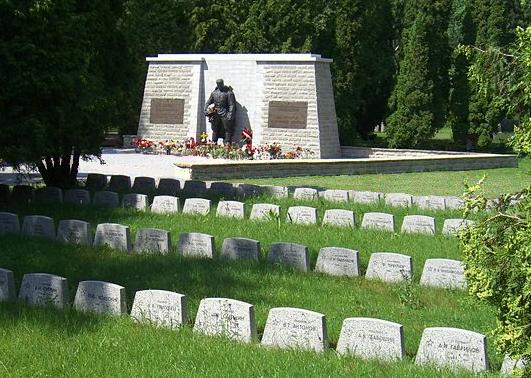
The Bronze Soldier monument, with the stone structure reconstructed, at its new permanent location, June 2007

In 2006, the conservative Pro Patria Union petitioned the Tallinn City Council to demolish the monument, which saw the Estonian president in January 2007 vetoing a bill which would have allowed for its destruction and instead ordering its removal from the city centre. In February 2007, Estonian nationalists unsuccessfully attempted to place on the statue a wreath made of barbed wire decorated with a plaque saying "Murderers of the Estonian People".

Amid political controversy, in April 2007 the newly elected Ansip government started final preparations for the reburial of the remains and relocation of the statue, according to the political mandate received during the March 2007 elections. The government claimed that the location of the memorial at a busy intersection in Tallinn was not a proper resting place, which led critics to accuse the government of pandering to Estonian nationalist groups. Disagreement over the appropriateness of the action led to mass protests and riots (accompanied by looting) lasting two nights, the worst Estonia has seen.

In the early morning hours of 27 April 2007, after the first night's rioting, the government decided, at an emergency meeting, to dismantle the monument immediately, referring to security concerns. By the following afternoon the stone structure had been dismantled as well. As of the afternoon of 30 April, the statue without the stone structure had been placed at the Defence Forces Cemetery of Tallinn. An opening ceremony for the relocated statue was held on 8 May, VE Day. (Significantly, Red Army veterans celebrate Victory Day a day later, on 9 May.) During June 2007 the stone structure was rebuilt. Relatives have made claims to bodies of four of the war dead. Unclaimed remains were reburied at the military cemetery, next to the relocated monument, on 3 July 2007.

On 27 April 2007, alongside the riots, there was also a huge and coordinated cyber-attack on Estonian institutions, including its Parliament, banks, and newspaper agencies. Although the Estonian government blamed Kremlin, no direct evidence could be produced.

== Vandalization in protest of the Russian attack on Ukraine ==
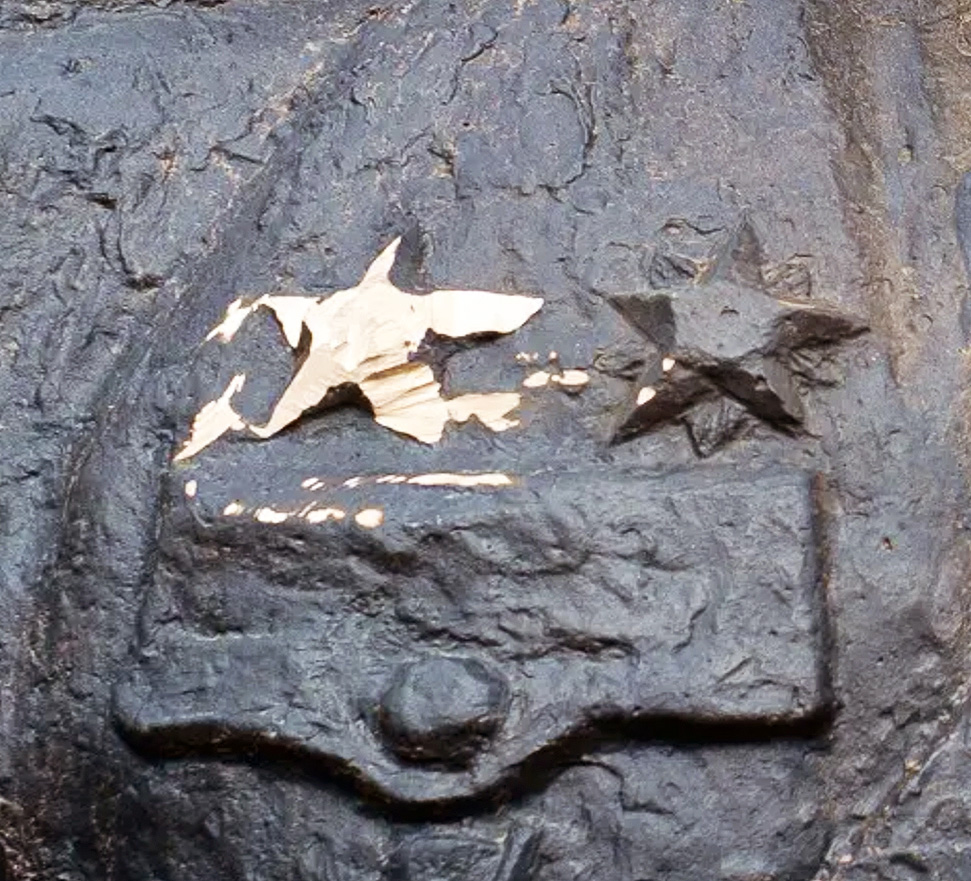
The Bronze Soldier of Tallinn monument, vandalized in protest of the Russian attack on Ukraine, 12 April 2022.

On 12 April 2022, the Bronze Soldier entered the news again, when protesters of the Russian attack on Ukraine ground one of the medals off its chest. This came in the context of a governmental ban on symbols of Russian militarism and public meetings which incite violence, leading up to the anniversary of May 9.

== Gallery ==
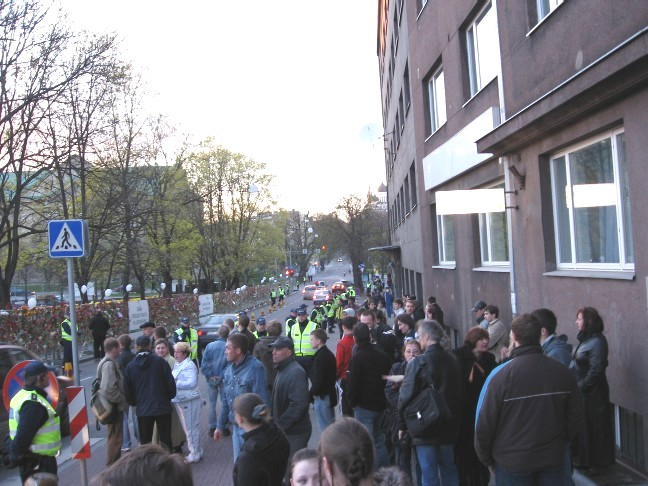
Flowers and police at the old location of the monument, 9 May 2007

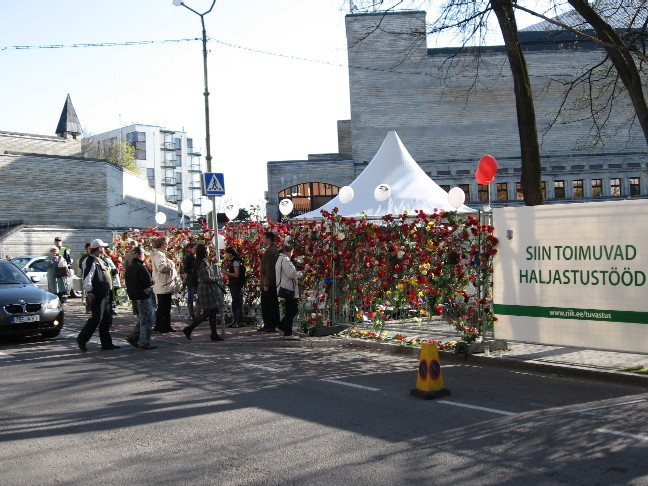
Flowers at the old location of the monument, 9 May 2007, with the excavation tent in the background

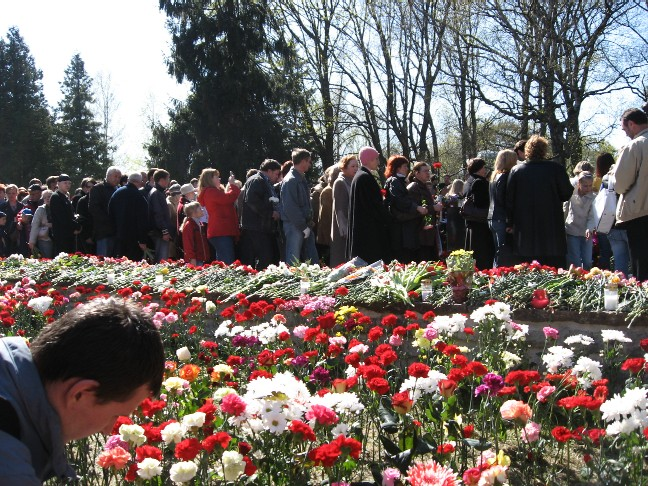
First Victory Day at the new location, 9 May 2007

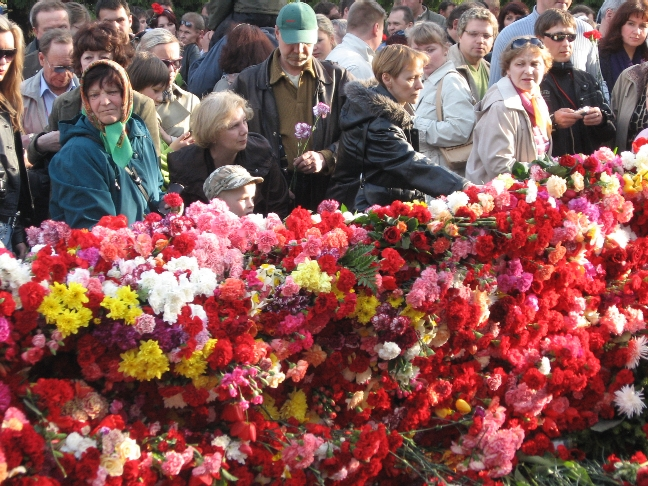
Second Victory Day at the new location, 9 May 2008

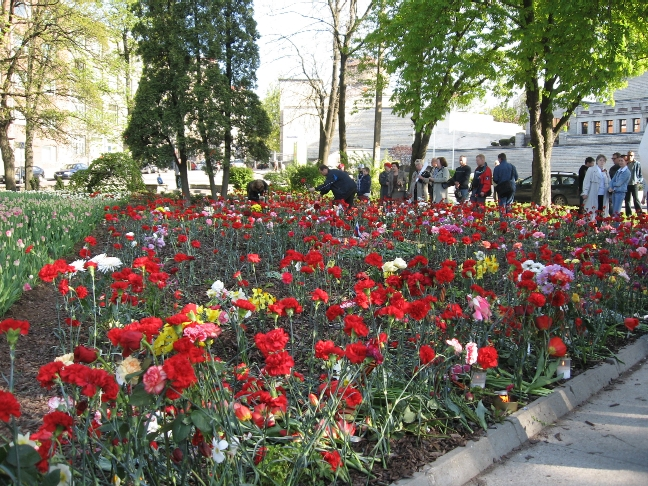
Flowers on the old site of the monument 9 May 2008

== See also ==
- 2007 cyberattacks on Estonia
- Kalamaja cemetery
- Kopli cemetery
- Monument of Lihula
