= Russian influence operations in Estonia =

Russian influence operations in Estonia consist of the alleged actions taken by the government of the Russian Federation to produce a favorable political and social climate in the Republic of Estonia. According to the Estonian Internal Security Service, Russian influence operations in Estonia form a complex system of financial, political, economic and espionage activities in Republic of Estonia for the purposes of influencing Estonia's political and economic decisions in ways considered favourable to the Russian Federation and conducted under the doctrine of near abroad. Conversely, the ethnic Russians in Estonia generally take a more sympathetic view of Moscow than that of the Estonian government. According to some, such as Professor Mark A. Cichock of the University of Texas at Arlington, the Russian government has actively pursued the imposition of a dependent relationship upon the Baltic states, with the desire to remain the region's dominant actor and political arbiter, continuing the Soviet pattern of hegemonic relations with these small neighbouring states. According to the Centre for Geopolitical Studies, the Russian information campaign which the centre characterises as a "real mud throwing" exercise, has provoked a split in Estonian society amongst Russian speakers, inciting some to riot over the relocation of the Bronze Soldier. The 2007 cyberattacks on Estonia is considered to be an information operation against Estonia, with the intent to influence the decisions and actions of the Estonian government. While Russia denies any direct involvement in the attacks, hostile rhetoric from the political elite via the media influenced people to attack.

== Nature of influence operations ==
According to Mariusz Nogaj, influence operations are orchestrated through the insertion of specific press articles in foreign newspapers, sponsoring NGOs or informal groups (activists and youth groups), or so called black public relations.

Richard H. Shultz and Roy Godson contend that "an agent of influence may be a journalist, a government official, a labor leader, an academic, an opinion leader, an artist, or involved in one of a number of other professions. The main objective of an influence operation is the use of the agent's position - be it in government, politics, labor, journalism, or some other field to support and promote political conditions desired by the sponsoring foreign power".

In relation to Russia's influence operation in regard to NATO accession by Estonia and the other Eastern European states, Janusz Bugajski noted "Regular propaganda attacks by Russia's state media outlets are supplemented by more systematic disinformation campaign in familiar KGB style operations. These have targeted particular government, specific politicians, or pro-Western political parties in nearby states. These targets are depicted as dangerously ‘Russophobic’ and thus their inclusion NATO would allegedly poison the West's relations with Russia and introduce unstable states into the Alliance. The Russian press has frequently cited U.S. and European commentators who speak out against NATO enlargement on the grounds that it will undermine relations with Moscow by making the Alliance more anti-Russian."

== Involvement in Estonian politics ==
Russia has exerted intense diplomatic, economic, and psychological pressure on Estonia in order to influence the Estonian policy toward its Russian population. According to the Estonian Internal Security Service, in 2007, one of the primary goals of the Russian activities was to achieve representation of the Constitution Party in Riigikogu, the Estonian parliament. The party is a minor political organisation run from Moscow.

== Involvement in European politics ==
Russia has used disinformation campaigns and international institutions as platforms for accusations of discrimination against minorities, aggravating inter-ethnic tensions in a way that has worked against the country's integration policies. According to the Estonian Internal Security Service yearbook published in April 2009, Russian special services are trying to influence the 2009 European Parliament election in Estonia in a way that would lead to election of somebody loyal to Kremlin, possibly Aleksei Semjonov or Dimitri Klenski, to the European Parliament.

== Attempts of mobilisation of Russian diaspora ==
Russia has long sought to politically mobilize its diaspora in order to exert influence At various times Russian national television, accessible to this diaspora, has effectively shaped anti-Estonian sentiment with the state controlled media redoubling their anti-Estonian campaign after specific events that displease Moscow. According to the Estonian Internal Security Service, attempts to build a "fifth column" consisting of Russophone people loyal to Russia from residents of Estonia, Russian organs have from the latter days of Intermovement been systematically spreading rumours regarding anti-Russian discrimination in many forms in Estonia and, since the Bronze Nights, also rumours regarding intense hatred between Estonians and Russians in Estonia. In relation to the Bronze Soldier controversy, President of Estonia Toomas Hendrik Ilves "We are witnesses to the information war against Estonia which is already reminiscent of an ideological aggression".

Several international organisations, including Amnesty International, have presented evidence of discrimination against ethnic minorities in Estonia, but the Estonian government claims that statistical studies do not back up neither the claims of discrimination nor claims of widespread ethnic hatred.

The Embassy of Russia in Tallinn denies such activities.

=== Examples ===
Few international human rights agencies have argued for some of the allegations of discrimination. According to Amnesty International, Russian speakers are victims of discrimination in Estonia. On the other hand, Edward Lucas of The Economist regards the Amnesty International report as a bad piece of work which is both ahistorical and unbalanced, and criticized the organization's use of limited resources as bizarre when there are real human rights abuses in Belarus and Russia.

Forum Development and Transition published an article in 2005 alleging Latvia and Estonia employ a "sophisticated and extensive policy regime of discrimination" against their respective Russophone populations. In that same newsletter Professor Hughes' arguments were opposed by former Latvian minister for social integration Dr. Nils Muiznieks who argued his views were simplistic and "similar to what Russian propaganda has been touting in international fora over the last 10 years".

The European Centre for Minority Issues has also examined Estonia's treatment of its Russophone minority. In the conclusion of its Working Paper No. 20, the author notes that "As the UN Human Rights Committee reports reveal, additional efforts will be needed to reduce the number of stateless persons", "Whereas all international organisations agree that no forms of systematic discrimination towards the Russian-speaking and often stateless population can be observed, a lack of attention to these people's rights increases the danger of social destabilisation", "The EU preaccession conditionality has - together with the efforts of other international organisations (..) resulted in a number of amendments to laws on education, language and the status of noncitizens, efforts which can be praised as largely eliminating the possibility of ethnic violence. This, however, does not imply that all problems of integration have been solved (..) Tackling the high number of stateless persons and the comparatively low number of naturalisations, problems of political participation and the socio-economic impact of restrictive language and citizenship policies remains an importance challenge".

== Historical propaganda ==
Use of historical propaganda is another way in which Russia seeks to influence Estonia. According to the 2010 Estonian Internal Security Service annual report, themes drawn from World War 2 are used in information attacks upon Estonia. 2010 saw the Russian Federation Council member Boris Shpigel initiate the formation of the organisation "World without Nazism" in Kyiv, with the aim of creating the situation where questioning Russia's version of historical events is equated with Holocaust denial. The organisation's management board has two Estonian resident representatives Maksim Reva and Andrei Zarenkov, who according to the Estonian Internal Security Service are radical nationalists who promote Russian chauvinism.

== See also ==
- Estonia-Russia relations
- Russkiy Mir Foundation
- Transnational repression by Russia
