= Aleksander Toots =

Estonian police officer

Aleksander Toots (born 7 December 1969 in Kohtla-Järve) is the deputy director of Estonia's counterintelligence service Estonian Internal Security Service, also known as KAPO. He started his career in Ida-Viru police precinct. Since 1993 he has held different positions in KAPO. He was the chief of Virumaa department since 2002. In March 2008, he became the deputy chief of the Estonian Security Police. He has graduated from Paikuse police school, Estonian Academy of Security Sciences in Nomme and the Police College.

Aleksander Toots is considered to be the best counterintelligence specialist in Estonia. He is the chief architect behind apprehending traitor Herman Simm. He has also orchestrated the capture of KAPO officers Aleksei Dressen and Indrek Põder.

He was made deputy chief of service by current chief Raivo Aeg. Because of many high-profile cases solved by him, he is also considered to be the actual chief of the Estonian Security Police.

Aleksander Toots has been awarded the Order of the Cross of the Eagle in 1998 and again in 2008.
