= Anti-Western sentiment =

Hatred or opposition towards the Western world or its people

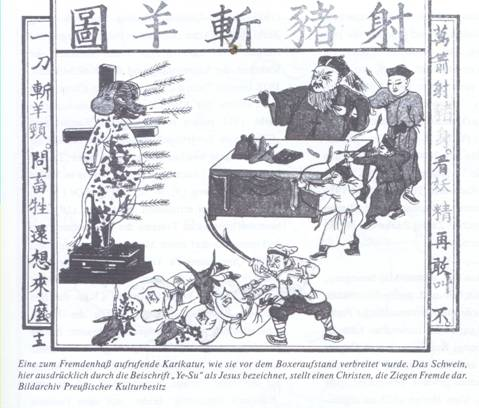
Chinese pamphlet issued during the Boxer Rebellion depicting the Europeans (represented as having goat heads) being slaughtered and Manchu officials shooting at a crucified pig (meant to represent the Corpus Christi [which is Latin for "the body of Christ"] here)

Anti-Western sentiment, also known as anti-Atlanticism, Westophobia or Westernophobia, refers to the broad opposition or hostility towards the people, culture, or policies of the Western world.

This sentiment is found worldwide. It often stems from anti-imperialism and criticism of past colonial actions by Western powers. For example, in Africa, figures like Patrice Lumumba blamed the West for imperialism in the Congo region. In Ethiopia, resentment over internal politics and conflict resolution during the Tigray war led to anti-Western sentiment. In the Middle East, Pan-Arabism and Islamism contribute to anti-Western attitudes. Jihadist groups like Al-Qaeda and ISIS view Western countries as targets for terrorism due to perceived insults against Islam and military interventions in Muslim countries. Many Latin American countries harbor criticism due to historical American and European interventions. In Russia, anti-Western sentiment has been endorsed by many. Russian leaders have traditionally rejected Western liberalism which they see as a threat to Russian hegemony in the region.

The phenomenon is often exacerbated by contemporary events. In recent decades, anti-Western feelings have been fueled by factors such as the Iraq War, support for Israel, and sanctions against countries like Iran.

== Definition and usage ==
The Iraqi journalist Ghaith Abdul-Ahad argued in a 2012 opinion piece for The Guardian that modern anti-Western sentiment, in particular the form which exists in the Muslim world, stems from perceptions of Western nations as imperialist. Abdul-Ahad further argued that although European nations are frequently "deemed guilty for colonial crimes of the past and present", opposition to United States foreign policy (including America's support for Israel, the US-led occupation of Iraq and American sanctions against Iran in particular) constitutes the primary driving factor behind anti-Western sentiment.

Samuel P. Huntington argued in 1993 that after the Cold War ended international conflict over economic ideology would be replaced with conflict over cultural differences. His "Clash of Civilizations" argues that economic and political regionalism will increasingly shift non-Western countries towards geopolitical engagement with countries that share their values. He argues that Muslim population growth simultaneous to a growth in Islamic fanaticism is leading to a rejection of Westernization.

== Africa ==
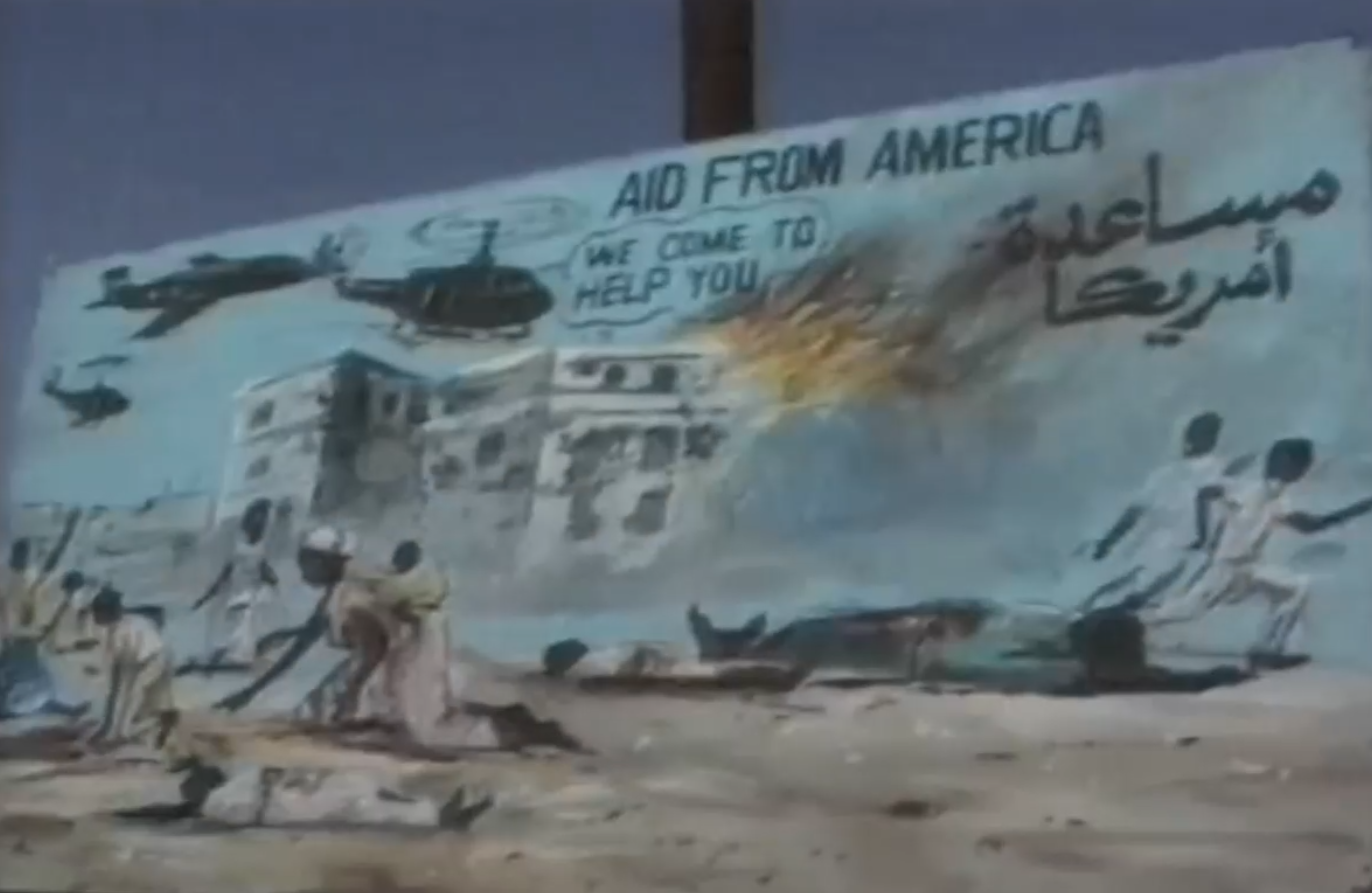
Anti-American graffiti at Mogadishu referring to the Bloody Monday raid

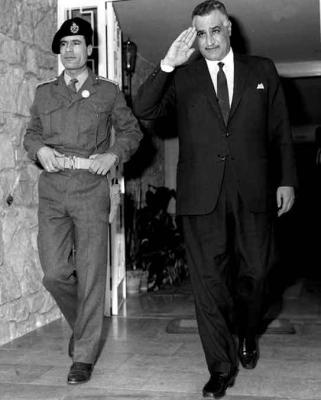
Libyan leader Muammar Gaddafi (left) with Egyptian President Gamal Abdel Nasser, 1969

=== Democratic Republic of the Congo ===
Congolese independence leader Patrice Lumumba blamed the Western world for imperialism. On 1 August 1960, he "gave a speech that indicated in no ambiguous terms that the United Nations, its Secretary-General, the United States, and the Western powers were all corrupt entities." During the Congo Crisis, Lumumba received support from the Soviet Union, which contributed to his overthrow and execution by the Western-backed Mobutu Sese Seko.

When Mobutu became leader of the Congo, he renamed the country Zaire and created the national policy of Authenticité or Zaireanization, which aimed to remove all Western cultural influence from the country.

In 2001, anti-Western sentiment skyrocketed in the Congo following the assassination of the Congolese president Laurent Kabila, with many Congolese citizens blaming the Western world for his death.

=== Ethiopia ===
Anti-Western sentiment was broadly expressed in Ethiopia during the Tigray War as a result of resentment over pressure in internal politics and request over resolution of the conflict. On 30 May 2021, a pro-government rally took place in Addis Ababa to protest an international pressure denouncing "Western intervention" and US economic and security assistance sanctions. Protestors also waved banners supporting the controversial Grand Ethiopian Renaissance Dam project. On 22 October 2022, tens of thousands protestors took a demonstration in Addis Ababa's Meskel Square, whereas the other cities in Ethiopia, including Bahir Dar, Gondar, Adama, Dire Dawa and Hawassa also hosted a similar demonstration to denounce the intervention.

=== Ghana ===
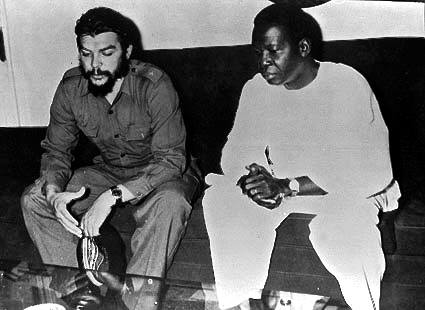
Kwame Nkrumah with Ernesto "Che" Guevara, January 1965

Kwame Nkrumah, the first president of Ghana, had a staunch anti-Western stance and blamed the United States for many of Africa's difficulties.

=== Nigeria ===
Located in northeastern Nigeria, the name of the extremist Islamic terrorist group Boko Haram translates to "Western education is forbidden" or "Western civilization is forbidden."

=== Zimbabwe ===
Former Zimbabwean president Robert Mugabe used anti-Western rhetoric in his speeches.

== Asia ==
=== China ===
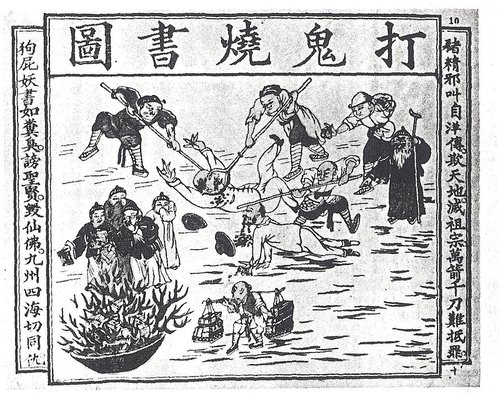
Anti-Western pamphlet issued during the Boxer Rebellion showing lynching of Christian missionaries (derogatorily referred to as 'ghosts' here) by the Chinese natives and burning of their books

Anti-Western sentiment in China has been increasing since the early 1990s, particularly among Chinese young adults. Notable incidents which have resulted in a significant anti-Western backlash have included the 1999 NATO bombing of the Chinese embassy in Belgrade, the 2008 demonstrations during the Olympic torch relay, and alleged Western media bias, especially in relation to the 2008 Tibetan unrest. While available public opinion polls show that the Chinese people view the United States in a positive light, there remains suspicion over the West's motives toward China stemming largely from historical experiences, specifically the "century of humiliation."

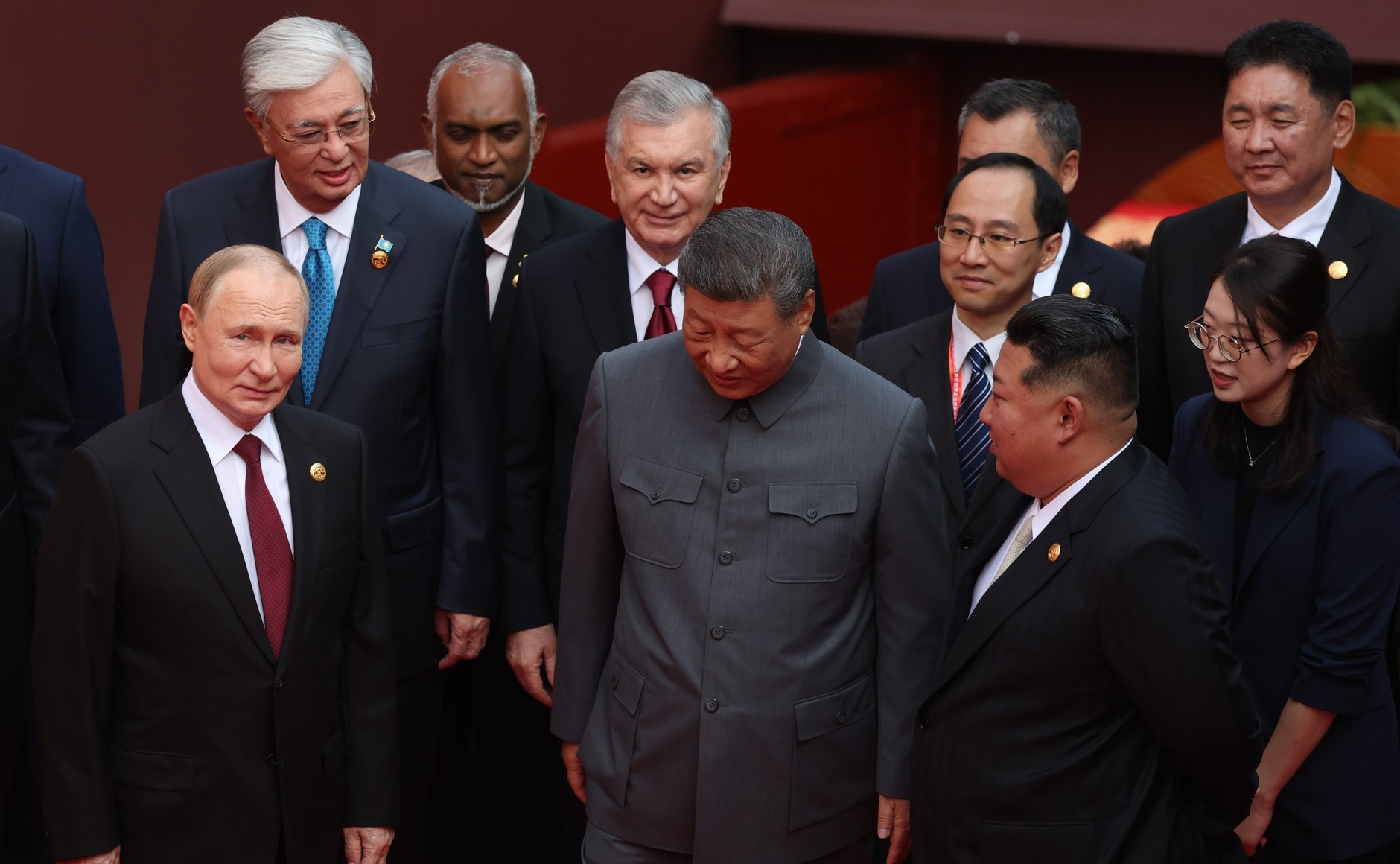
CCP General Secretary Xi Jinping with North Korean General Secretary Kim Jong Un and Russian President Vladimir Putin before the 2025 China Victory Day Parade

These suspicions have been increased by the Chinese Communist Party (CCP)'s "Patriotic Education Campaign". Although Chinese millennials are largely apathetic to politics, China's Gen Z now has an unprecedentedly low opinion of the West and "Western values" since the reform and opening up of the 1970s. Young Chinese have grievances such as the Western alienation of Chinese tech companies, anti-East Asian racism, anti-Chinese propaganda, and pressure on China's internal affairs, among other issues. In a study conducted by Toronto University in April 2020, 4 out of every 5 Chinese people under 30-years-old said they do not trust Americans.

=== India ===
Although opinion polls suggest positive views towards Western countries today, anti-Western sentiments were common during the British Raj due to the Indian independence movement.

Anti-Western sentiment is widespread within the Hindu nationalist circles due to various factors like Occidentalist caricatures and resentment against the anti-Hindu-pro-Muslim attitude of the Western world (which it sees to be dominated by wokes and Islamoleftists) in the context of conflict between Hindus and Muslims. Contempt for Western values like secularism and liberalism is encouraged by the Hindu nationalists as decolonialism.

=== Japan ===
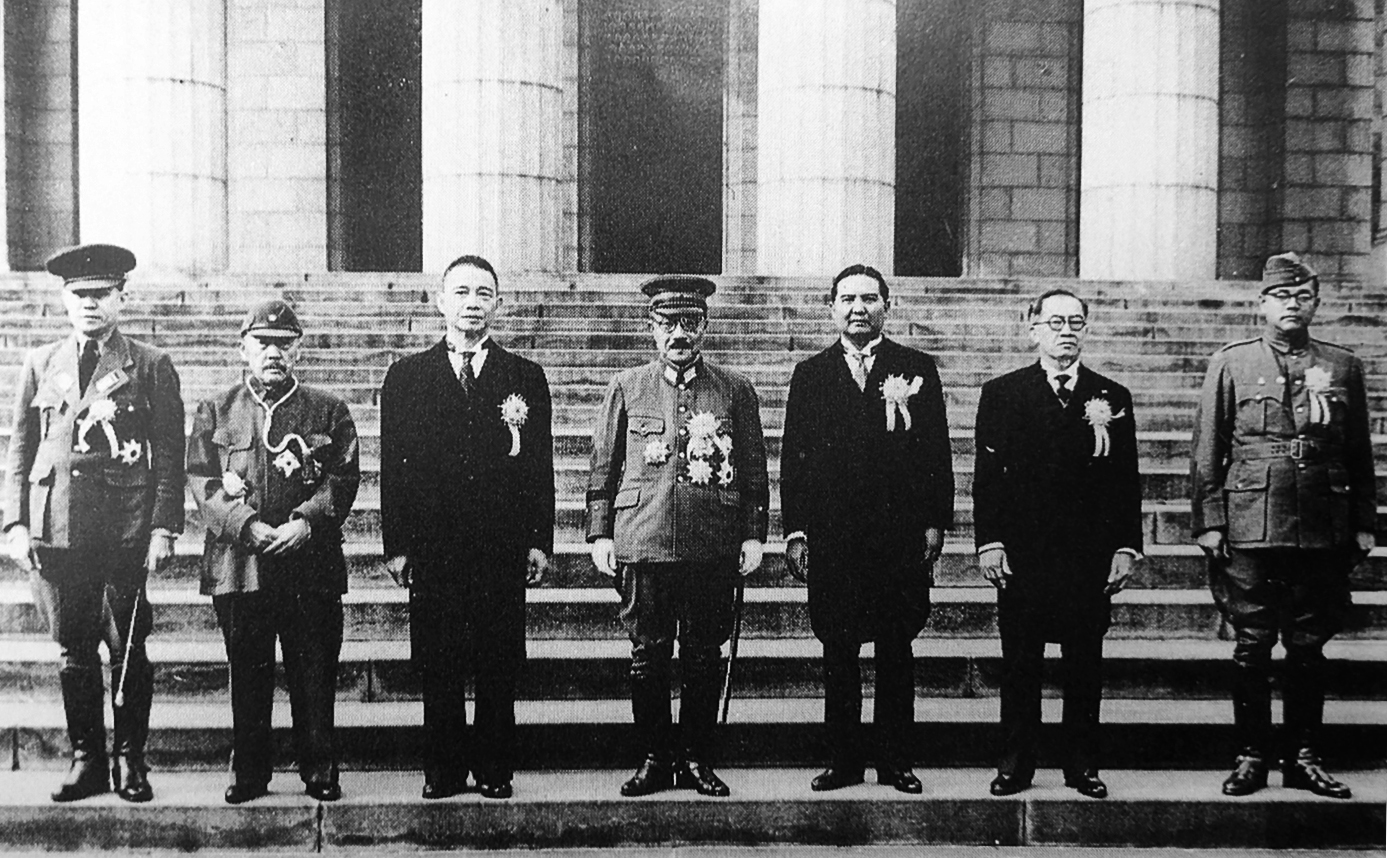
The Greater East Asia Conference in November 1943, participants left to right: Ba Maw, Zhang Jinghui, Wang Jingwei, Hideki Tojo, Wan Waithayakon, José P. Laurel, Subhas Chandra Bose.

There is a history of criticism of the west within the intellectual history of Japan.

=== Korea ===
Historically, anti-Western sentiment in Korea has been linked to the opposition to the Christian missionary activities in the region, most notably by the Donghak Movement. More recently, it has been related to the occasional difficulties in the American-Korean relationship in South Korea and, to a vastly more pronounced extent, North Korea.

Anti-western sentiments was just that extreme in the early phases of the Republic of Korea. It was confined to a very small number of people who faced arrest and jail under the National Security Law (1948). The Rhee administration largely exploited the National Security Act to garner support for his extreme right-wing power base. Its use also ensured that anti-Americanism remained the preserve of extremists ready to risk arrest. In practice, this meant that anti-Americanism remained intimately intertwined. It was associated with Marxism-Leninism until the onset of the democratisation movement.

=== Singapore ===
Lee Kuan Yew, the former Prime Minister of Singapore, argued that East Asian or Confucian countries such as China, Japan, Korea, and Vietnam should develop based on "Asian values" or what is generally referred to as "Confucian" or "Sinitic" values. In other words, countries such as the Four Asian Tigers should aspire to have Western-style standards of living without accepting liberal democratic social institutions and principles. The Asian values are primarily influenced by the ideals of Confucianism, notably filial piety, and social cohesion. The concept of Asian values is widely criticized as a means for instituting authoritarianism, notably by Amartya Sen.

=== Middle East ===
==== Islamism ====
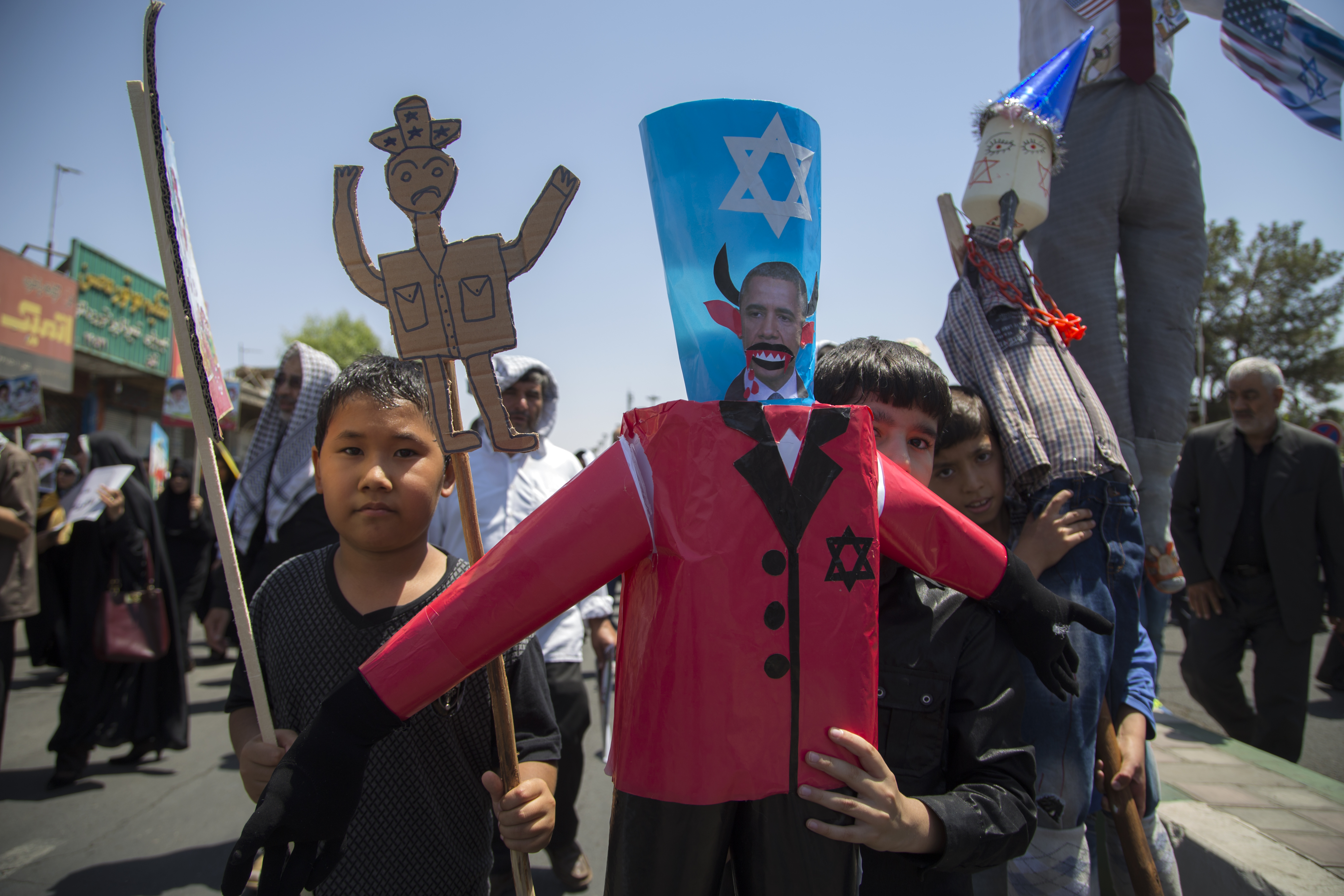
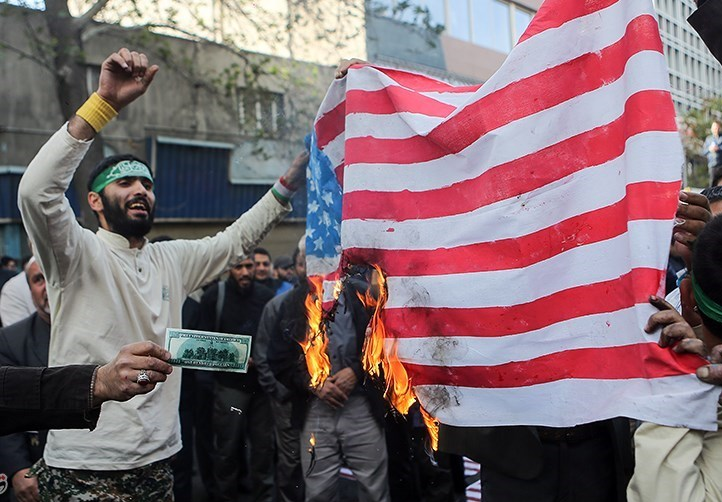
Anti-American protests in Iran

Together with political Salafis, jihadists (also called Salafist jihadists) view Christian Europe as a land inhabited by infidels (Dar al-Kufr). For jihadists, this makes Christian Europe a just target for armed jihad, e.g., acts of war or terrorist attacks. Jihadists refer to such lands as Dar al-Harb (lands of war). Jihadists themselves motivate their attacks in two prominent ways: to resist Western/Christian military intervention in Muslim countries, especially those committed in favour of Israel and to discourage perceived insults against Islam such as the Muhammad Cartoons.

John Calvert writes that in their critique of the West, Islamists quote Western thinkers like Alexis Carrel, Oswald Spengler, Arnold J. Toynbee, and Arthur Koestler.

Extremists terrorist groups al-Qaeda and ISIL/ISIS are said to be both anti-Western. They have been known to promote terrorism in Western countries, and anti-Western countries, most notably Russia.

== Europe ==
=== Russia ===
Russian President Vladimir Putin with religious leaders of Russia, 2015. Putin has promoted religious traditionalism and the rejection of some Western liberal principles, like toleration of homosexuality.

Samuel P. Huntington in Clash of Civilizations classifies Russia and the rest of Orthodox Europe as a different civilization from Western civilization.

Anti-Western sentiment in Russia dates back to the 19th-century intellectual debate between Westernizers and Slavophiles. While the former deemed Russia to be a lagging Western country, the latter rejected these claims outright and considered Western Europe to be 'rotten' (whence the Russian-language cliche phrase 'rotten West'). An important anti-Western figure during the reign of Alexander III of Russia was Konstantin Pobedonostsev, a former liberal who eventually renounced and thoroughly criticized his former views.

Under the Soviet Union, 'the West' eventually became synonymous with 'the capitalist world', resulting in the appearance of the famous propagandist cliché 'corrupting influence of the West'.

After the Cold War, a number of politicians in the Russian Federation have supported an explicit promotion of Russian Orthodox traditionalism and a rejection of Western liberalism. Some ultra-nationalist politicians, such as the late Vladimir Zhirinovsky, express the most anti-Western sentiment.

Vladimir Putin has promoted explicitly conservative policies in social, cultural and political matters, both at home and abroad. Putin has attacked globalism and neoliberalism and promoted new think tanks that stress Russian nationalism, the restoration of Russia's historical greatness, and systematic opposition to liberal ideas and policies. Putin has collaborated closely with the Russian Orthodox Church in this cultural campaign. Patriarch Kirill of Moscow, head of the Church, endorsed his election in 2012, stating Putin's terms were like "a miracle of God." The Russian Orthodox Church is known to host groups that promote nationalist and anti-Western tendencies.

The Russian government has restricted foreign funding of some liberal NGOs. Pro-Russian activists in the former Soviet Union frequently equate the West with homosexuality and the gay agenda. The 2013 Russian gay propaganda law was welcomed by nationalist and religious political figures in Russia as a bulwark against Western influence.

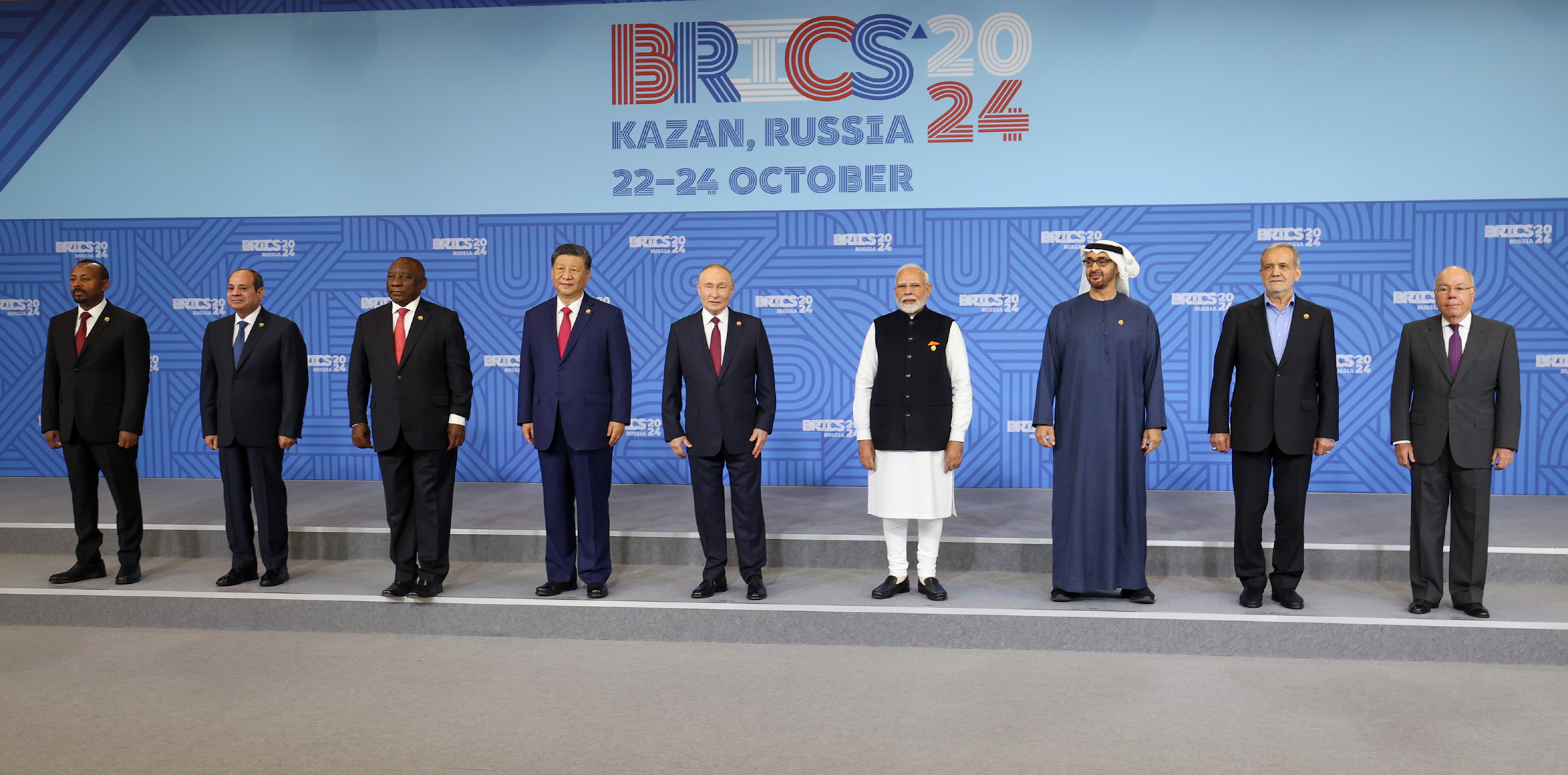
President Putin with Chinese leader Xi Jinping and other world leaders at the 16th BRICS summit in Kazan, Russia, October 2024

The Yarovaya Law prohibits evangelism by religious minorities. It was used to ban the United States-based Jehovah's Witnesses.

In 2023, Russia adopted a Eurasianist, anti-Western foreign policy strategy in a document titled "The Concept of the Foreign Policy of the Russian Federation" approved by Vladimir Putin. The document defined Russia as a "unique country-civilization and a vast Eurasian and Euro-Pacific power" that seeks to create a "Greater Eurasian Partnership" by pursuing close relations with China, India, countries of the Islamic World and rest of the Global South (Latin America and sub-Saharan Africa). The policy identifies United States and other Anglosphere as "the main inspirer, organizer and executor of the aggressive anti-Russian policy of the collective West" and seeks the end of geopolitical American dominance in the international scene.

In his speech in November 2023, Putin claimed that the Mongol-Tatar yoke resulting from the Mongol invasion of Kievan Rus' was better for the Russian people than Western domination, saying: “Alexander Nevsky received a jarlyk [permission] from the khans of the Golden Horde to rule as a prince, primarily so that he could effectively resist the invasion of the West." According to Putin, the decision to submit to the Tatar khans preserved "the Russian people – and later all the peoples living on the territory of our country."

=== Turkey ===
During the Ottoman period of Turkish history, a tradition of anti-Westernism developed.

=== Western Europe ===
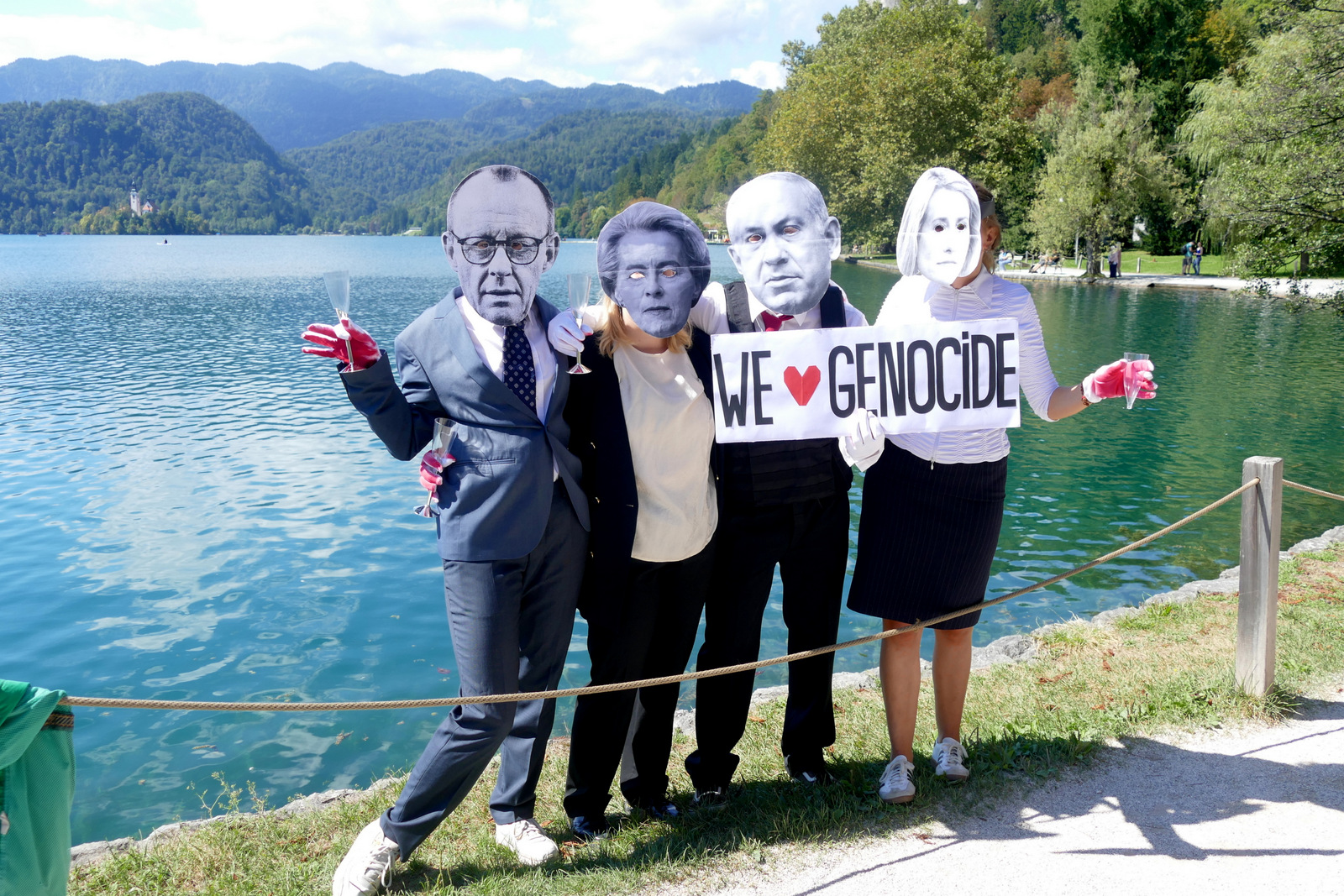
Protest in Slovenia against the alleged complicity of Friedrich Merz, Ursula von der Leyen and Kaja Kallas in the Gaza genocide, 1 September 2025

In Western Europe, hostility towards the West has often taken the form of opposition to the foreign policy of the United States and to NATO, and has come from both the far left and the far right.

During the Cold War, the Red Army Faction, a left-wing militant group that emerged from the 1968 protest movement and opposition to the Vietnam War, carried out attacks on United States military targets in West Germany, framing them as resistance to "American imperialism". A car bomb at the Rhein-Main Air Base in August 1985, attributed to the group, killed two people.

Parties on the far left and far right have also opposed NATO and Western policy towards Russia. A Martens Centre paper argues that European far-right parties see Vladimir Putin as a strong conservative leader opposed to Western liberalism, and that being both anti-American and against European integration makes closeness to Russia attractive to them. Marine Le Pen of the National Rally has met Putin several times, including at the Kremlin before the 2017 French presidential election. On the far left, analysts have attributed the resistance of parties such as La France Insoumise to sanctions on Russia largely to anti-Americanism. The pattern is not uniform, and several right-wing parties have distanced themselves from Moscow since the Russian invasion of Ukraine in 2022.

Since the start of the Gaza war, large pro-Palestinian demonstrations in cities including London, Berlin and Paris have criticised Western governments' support for Israel, with protesters calling for sanctions and an end to arms shipments.

== Latin America ==
Anti-Western sentiment exists in Latin America, especially in countries where the population consists mostly of Native Americans, such as Bolivia, Guatemala, or Peru. On the other hand, in countries like Argentina, Brazil, Chile, and Uruguay, Europeans are more represented in the population. Consequently, there are many Latin Americans who identify as Westerners, so the anti-Western discourse is therefore not as prominent as in other regions. That is not to say, however, that there is no anti-Western discourse. Indeed, it can be found in countries with nationalist and populist leaders or movements, including left-wing political parties in Colombia, Cuba, Mexico, Nicaragua, or Venezuela. In recent years, Latin American nations have increasingly turned away from the United States.

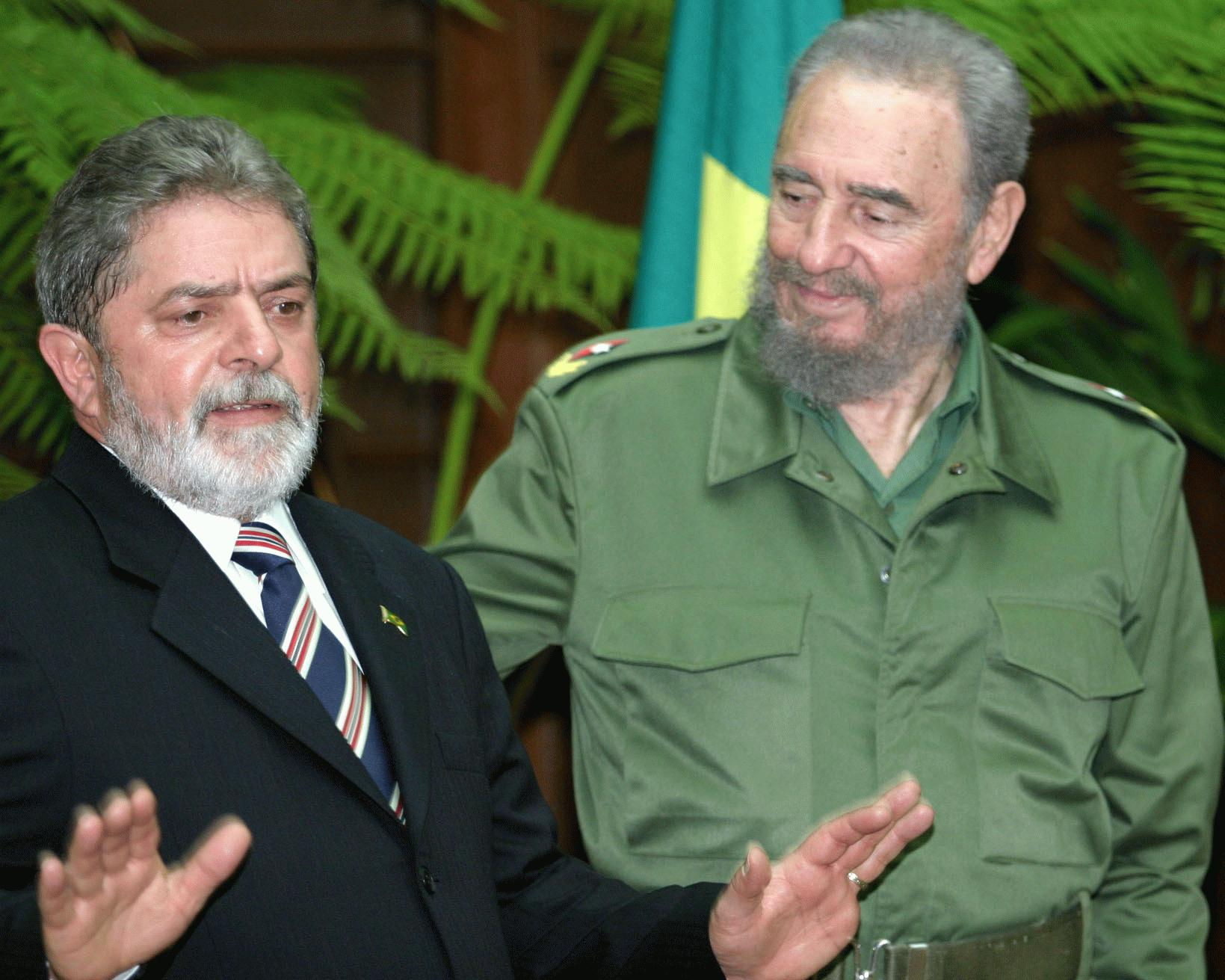
Fidel Castro (right) meeting with Brazilian president Lula da Silva, a significant "Pink Tide" leader

Anti-Western sentiments are related to the history of American and European political interventions in Latin America. Many people in the region lay sharp criticism on the United States for supporting Cold War era coups and CIA-backed military dictatorships. Most Latin American countries tend to be more regional, focusing on internal cooperation. Accompanying this is a notable distrust of globalization. Latin American organizations like Mercosur, Prosur and Unasur are strong groups that represent this aspect of Latin American foreign policy.

Samuel P. Huntington in Clash of Civilizations classifies Latin America as a distinct civilization from Western civilization, although he acknowledges it could alternatively be considered a subcivilization within the West. This classification has been questioned by scholars who ask why Catholic southern Europe is counted as Western while Latin America is not.

== See also ==
- Anti-Americanism
- Anti-Australian sentiment
- Anti-Canadian sentiment
- Anti-Europeanism
  - Anti-Armenian sentiment
  - Anti-Austrian sentiment
  - Anti-British sentiment
  - Anti-Croatian sentiment
  - Anti-Dutch sentiment
  - Anti-Estonian sentiment
  - Anti-French sentiment
  - Anti-Georgian sentiment
  - Anti-German sentiment
  - Anti-Greek sentiment
  - Anti-Hungarian sentiment
  - Anti-Irish sentiment
  - Anti-Italian sentiment
  - Anti-Polish sentiment
  - Anti-Portuguese sentiment
  - Anti-Romanian sentiment
  - Anti-Russian sentiment
  - Anti-Serbian sentiment
  - Anti-Slavic sentiment
  - Anti-Spanish sentiment
  - Anti-Ukrainian sentiment
- Anti-Israeli sentiment
- Anti-Japanese sentiment
- Anti-Palestine sentiment
- Anti-South Korean sentiment
- Anti-Turkish sentiment
- Anti-imperialism
- Anti-Christian sentiment
- Clash of Civilizations
- Occidentalism
- Criticism of globalization
- Gharbzadegi
- Neocolonialism
- Pan-nationalism
- Left-wing populism
- Post-Western era
- Racism
- Reverse racism
- Right-wing populism
- Active measures
- Anti-White racism
