= Zentsov =

Zentsov (Russian: Зенцов) is a Russian masculine surname, its feminine counterpart is Zentsova. Notable people with the surname include:

- Roman Zentsov (born 1973), Russian mixed martial arts artist
- Valeri Zentsov (born 1946), Russian spy
