= Eston Kohver =

Estonian police officer

- Born: 1971 (age 54–55); Jõhvi, Ida-Viru County, Estonia
- Military career
- Allegiance: Estonia
- Branch: Internal Security Service
- Rank: Officer
- Awards: Order of the Cross of the Eagle

Eston Kohver (born 1971) is an Estonian officer of the Estonian Internal Security Service who was detained by the Russian FSB on 5 September 2014 under disputed circumstances, creating a major political rift in Estonia–Russia relations. In Russia, Kohver was convicted of espionage and sentenced to 15 years in prison, but in September 2015 was returned to Estonia in a prisoner exchange.

== Early life and career ==
Kohver was born in Jõhvi, in what is now Estonia's Ida-Viru County. He completed his 8-grade basic school education at Jõhvi Gymnasium, then he attended the Adolf Kesler 5th Secondary School in Kohtla-Järve. In 1991 he graduated from the militia school in Nõmme, Tallinn. In 1992, he entered the Estonian National Defence College, and graduated from it in 1996 as ensign, in the ranks of correction college. Eston Kohver was among the four or five Defence College students to join the reestablished security police for field training when the security police was seeking staff in 1994. After the college he became an employee of the Estonian Internal Security Service. In 2010, Kohver was awarded by the President with Order of the Cross of the Eagle, 5th class.

Kohver was described by many of his colleagues and friends as a highly skilled, hardworking, sharp employee with great personal characteristics, having an excellent knowledge of both Estonian and Russian languages. Married, has four children.

== Detainment by Russian authorities ==
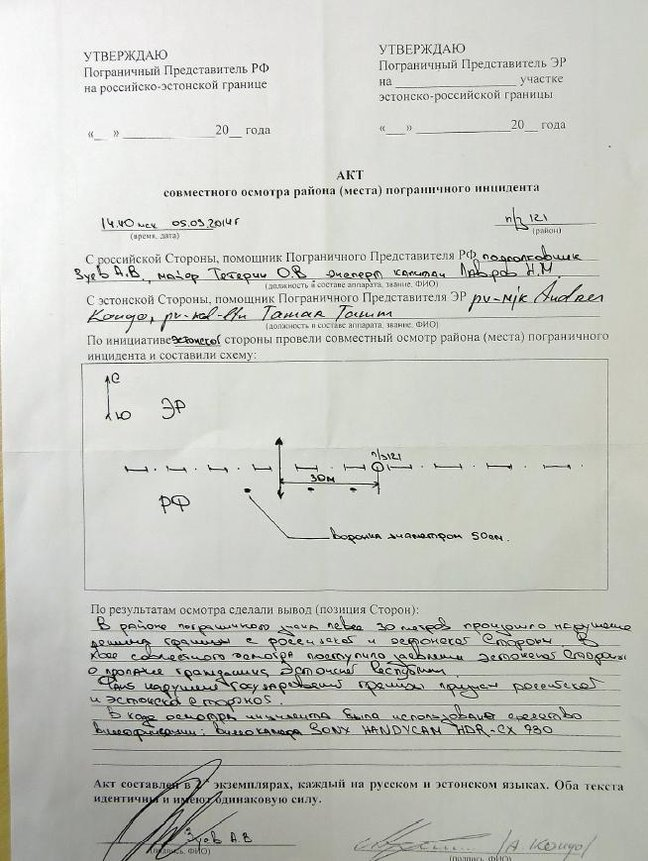
Official Russian protocol describing the border incursion related to the Eston Kohver's capture, noting the location of the crossing with arrows and craters on the Russian side of the border.

Estonia states that Kohver was abducted on 5 September 2014 at gunpoint from the Estonian side of the border by Russians using a smoke grenade and radio jammers, while Russia insists that Kohver had crossed the border, and had €5,000, a pistol, "special equipment to carry out covert recording", and "materials that seem to be assignments for an intelligence-gathering mission". The Estonian Internal Security Service confirmed that Kohver was carrying his service pistol, cash and recording equipment in his task of investigating cross border crime and smuggling. He was due to meet a possible informant on the border as part of the investigation, but instead walked into a trap set up by the FSB. The incident occurred about 8 kilometres (5.0 mi) north of the border crossing at Luhamaa, in a secluded and forested area near the village of Miikse. The defense lawyer appointed by the Russian state to represent Eston Kohver claims that the FSB has thorough video recordings on Kohver crossing the border.

According to the Estonian Internal Security Service, immediately after the incident Estonian investigators and Russian border guards jointly investigated the scene, and agreed that the evidence showed that there were signs of a violent struggle and impact craters from the smoke grenades on the Russian side (in both protocols), with multiple footprints in a band of raked sand suggesting that a group of men crossed from and then returned to the Russian side (only in Estonian protocol). On 10 September, Estonian newspapers published a bilingual protocol of border violation, signed on 5 September by Estonian and Russian border guards who had inspected the place immediately after the incident. Both versions of the protocol indicate the direction of the incursion with a double-ended arrow across the border 30 metres (98 ft) from a border post and three craters 50 centimetres (20 in) in diameter on the Russian side of the border. The Russian version acknowledges the Estonian version as equally authentic. However the protocols appear to be not identical. The Estonian version explicitly mentions that the border breach originated in the Russian side to the Estonian one and then back, but the Russian version of the protocol does not contain any detail about the direction of the border breach.

Eerik-Niiles Kross, a former Estonian national security advisor, speculated that the crime being investigated by Kohver may have involved criminals with ties to the FSB. In January 2015 Estonian media speculated that Kohver may have been captured to force Estonian government to exchange him for a Federal Security Service spy Aleksei Dressen convicted in 2012.

== Imprisonment ==
The European Union reiterated in March 2015 that Kohver had been "illegally detained" in Lefortovo Prison and deprived of the legal support, and called for his immediate release.

Brian Whitmore of Radio Free Europe criticised media reports that used a "he-said-she-said formulation, implicitly suggesting that the Estonian and Russian versions of events carried equal weight."

Kohver was convicted in August 2015 and sentenced to 15 years in prison. As well as the prison sentence, the court in Pskov region ordered him to pay a fine of 100,000 roubles (€1,800).

Estonian Prime Minister Taavi Rõivas and diplomat Jüri Luik condemned the jail term and accused the Russian authorities of conducting a show trial. The EU's head of foreign affairs Federica Mogherini stated that Kohver's "abduction and subsequent illegal detention in Russia constitute a clear violation of international law" and that Russia had denied him a fair trial.

On 26 September 2015, he was handed over to Estonia in exchange for Aleksei Dressen (a video from the exchange was later released).

== See also ==
- Hostage diplomacy
- Nadiya Savchenko
- Oleg Sentsov
- Guillaume Schnaebelé
- Venlo incident
