= Estonia–Russia relations =

- Estonia: Russia

Estonia–Russia relations are the bilateral foreign relations between Estonia and Russia. Diplomatic relations between the two countries were established on 2 February 1920 after the Estonian War of Independence ended in Estonian victory with Russia recognizing Estonia's sovereignty and renounced any and all territorial claims on Estonia.

Despite Russia and Estonia signing a non aggression treaty on 4 May 1932, the German-Soviet Nonaggression Pact and its Secret Additional Protocol of August 1939 gave Russia the opportunity on 24 September 1939 to threaten Estonia by land, sea and air, unless Russian troops were allowed to establish military bases in Estonia. This started the occupation of Estonia, which only ended with the fall of the USSR. On 6 September 1991, the State Council of the Soviet Union recognised the independence of Estonia.

Estonia began moving away from Russian influence, rejecting Russia's economic model in favour of an open market and joining the European Union and NATO in 2004. Relations remained cold, deteriorating further following the 2022 Russian invasion of Ukraine.

== History ==
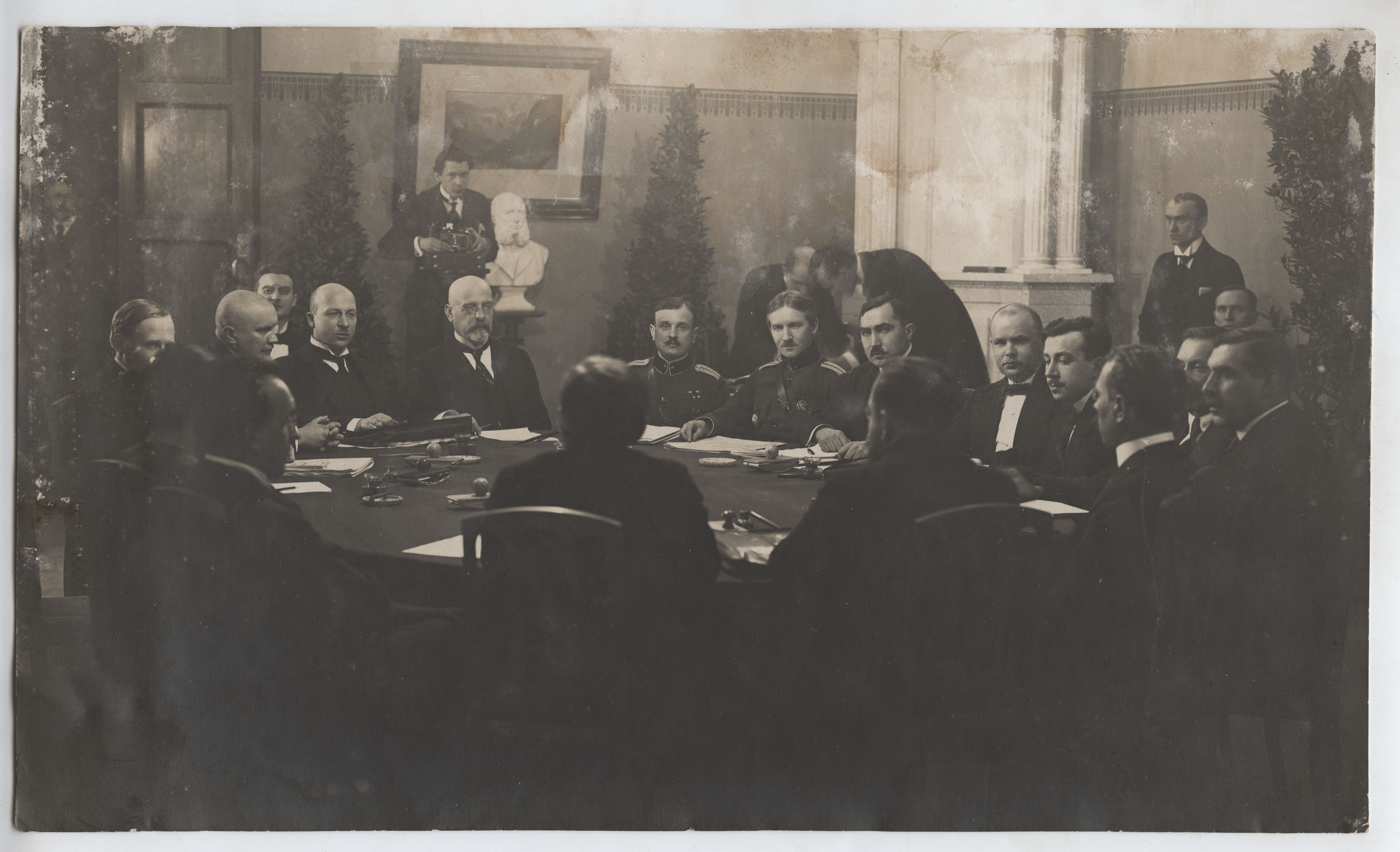
Estonian and Russian delegations sign the Treaty of Tartu (1920) in which Russia renounced any claims to the Estonian territory.

Diplomatic relations between then newly independent Republic of Estonia and the Russian SFSR were established on 2 February 1920, when Soviet Russia recognized de jure the independence of the Republic of Estonia, and renounced in perpetuity all rights to the territory of Estonia, via the Treaty of Tartu (Russian–Estonian). At the time, the Bolsheviks had just gained control of the majority of Russian territory, and their government's legitimacy was being contested by Western powers and the Russian White movement.

=== Estonia and Tsardom of Russia ===
In 1558 Ivan IV of Russia invaded the Livonian Confederation (the territory of present-day Estonia and Latvia), starting the Livonian War (1558–1582), a military conflict between the Tsardom of Russia and a coalition of Denmark, Grand Duchy of Lithuania, Kingdom of Poland (later the Polish–Lithuanian Commonwealth), and Sweden. Following the signing of the Treaty of Jam Zapolski in 1582 between Russia and the Polish-Lithuanian Commonwealth, Russia renounced its claims to Livonia. The following year, the Tsar also made peace with Sweden. Under the Treaty of Plussa, Russia lost Narva and the southern coast of the Gulf of Finland, being its only access to the Baltic Sea. The situation was partially reversed 12 years later, according to the Treaty of Tyavzino which concluded a new war between Sweden and Russia.

=== Estonia and Russian Empire ===
==== Great Northern War ====
Sweden's defeat in the Great Northern War in 1721 resulted in the Treaty of Nystad, in which the Russian Empire gained Sweden's Baltic territories, Estonia (nowadays northern Estonia) and Livonia (nowadays southern Estonia and northern Latvia). The legal system, Lutheran church, local and town governments, and education remained mostly German until the late 19th century and partially until 1918.

By 1819, the Baltic provinces were the first in the Russian Empire in which serfdom was abolished, allowing the farmers to own their own land. These moves created the economic foundation for the coming to life of the local national identity and culture as Estonia was caught in a current of national awakening that began sweeping through Europe in the mid-19th century.

=== Estonian Declaration of Independence ===
During World War I, between the retreating Soviet Russian and advancing German troops on 24 February 1918 the Salvation Committee of the Estonian National Council Maapäev issued the Estonian Declaration of Independence.

=== Estonia and Soviet Russia ===
The Estonian War of Independence (1918–1920) was Estonia's struggle for sovereignty in the aftermath of World War I and the 1917 Russian Revolution. The war ended in 1920 with Estonia's victory over Soviet Russia (Russian SFSR). The Treaty of Tartu was a peace treaty between Estonia and Russian SFSR signed on 2 February 1920 that ended the Estonian War of Independence. According to the treaty, Soviet Russia recognized Estonia's sovereignty and renounced any and all territorial claims on Estonia.

=== Estonia and Soviet Union ===
==== Political relations ====
Soon after the foundation of the Soviet Union in 1922, the Soviet leader Vladimir Lenin's incapacity and death (on 21 January 1924) triggered a struggle for power between Leon Trotsky and Joseph Stalin. During the struggle Soviet foreign policy drifted. On 1 December 1924, Comintern conducted an unsuccessful military coup attempt in Estonia.

==== Treaties between Estonia and USSR ====
Before World War II, the Republic of Estonia and USSR had both signed and ratified following treaties:

Kellogg–Briand Pact
27 August 1928 Kellogg–Briand Pact renouncing war as an instrument of national policy Ratified by Estonia and USSR on 24 July 1929

Non-aggression treaty
Estonia, USSR on 4 May 1932

The Convention for the Definition of Aggression
On 3 July 1933 for the first time in the history of international relations, aggression was defined in a binding treaty signed at the Soviet Embassy in London by USSR and among others, The Republic of Estonia.

Article II defines forms of aggression. There shall be recognized as an aggressor that State which shall be the first to have committed one of the following actions:

Relevant chapters:

- Second– invasion by armed forces of the territory of another State even without a declaration of war.
- Fourth– a naval blockade of coasts or ports of another State.

===== Beginning of World War II =====
The fate of the relations between USSR and Republic of Estonia before World War II was decided by the German-Soviet Nonaggression Pact and its Secret Additional Protocol of August 1939.

- 1 September 1939, Germany invaded Poland.
- 3 September, Great Britain, France, Australia, and New Zealand declared war on Germany
- 14 September, the Polish submarine ORP Orzeł reached Tallinn, Estonia
- 17 September, Soviet Union invaded Poland
- 18 September, Orzeł incident, the Polish submarine escaped from internment in Tallinn and eventually made her way to the United Kingdom, Estonia's neutrality was questioned by the Soviet Union and Germany.

On 24 September 1939, warships of the Red Navy appeared off Estonian ports, Soviet bombers began a threatening patrol over Tallinn and the nearby countryside. In light of the Orzeł incident, the Moscow press and radio started violently attacking Estonia as "hostile" to the Soviet Union. Moscow demanded that Estonia allow the USSR to establish military bases and station 25,000 troops on Estonian soil for the duration of the European war. The government of Estonia accepted the ultimatum signing the corresponding agreement on 28 September 1939. The Soviet–Estonian Mutual Assistance Treaty was made for ten years:

- Estonia granted the USSR the right to maintain naval bases and airdromes protected by Red Army troops on the strategic islands dominating Tallinn, the Gulf of Finland and the Gulf of Riga;
- Soviet Union agreed to increase her annual trade turnover with Estonia and to give Estonia facilities in case the Baltic is closed to her goods for trading with the outside world via Soviet ports on the Black Sea and White Sea;
- USSR and Estonia undertook to defend each other from "aggression arising on the part of any great European power"
- It was declared: the Pact "should not affect" the "economic systems and state organizations" of USSR and Estonia.

===== Soviet occupation of 1940 =====
RSFSR–Estonian SSR relations
- Russian SFSR: Estonian SSR

On 12 June 1940 the order for total military blockade of Estonia was given to the Soviet Baltic Fleet.

On 14 June, the Soviet military blockade of Estonia took effect. Two Soviet bombers downed a Finnish passenger airplane Kaleva flying from Tallinn to Helsinki and carrying three diplomatic pouches from the U.S. legations in Tallinn, Riga and Helsinki.

Molotov had accused the Baltic states of conspiracy against the Soviet Union and delivered an ultimatum to Estonia for the establishment of a government the Soviets approve of. The Estonian government decided according to the Kellogg-Briand Pact not to use war as an instrument of national policy. On 17 June 1940, the Soviet Union invaded Estonia. The Red Army exited from their military bases in Estonia, some 90,000 additional Soviet troops entered the country. Given the overwhelming Soviet force both on the borders and inside the country, not to resist, to avoid bloodshed and open war.

The Soviet occupation of Estonia was complete by 21 June 1940 and rendered "official" by a communist coup d'état supported by the Soviet troops.

Most of the Estonian Defence Forces and the Estonian Defence League surrendered according to the orders believing that resistance was useless and were disarmed by the Red Army. Only the Estonian Independent Signal Battalion stationed in Tallinn at Raua Street showed resistance. As the Red Army brought in additional reinforcements supported by six armoured fighting vehicles, the battle lasted several hours until sundown. There was one dead, several wounded on the Estonian side and about 10 killed and more wounded on the Soviet side. Finally the military resistance was ended with negotiations and the Single Signal Battalion surrendered and was disarmed.

On 14–15 July 1940 rigged "parliamentary elections" were staged where all but pro-Communist candidates were outlawed. Those who failed to have their passports stamped for so voting faced being arrested and executed by the Soviet regime. Tribunals were set up to punish "traitors to the people." those who had fallen short of the "political duty" of voting Estonia into the USSR. The "parliament" so elected proclaimed Estonia a "Soviet republic" on 21 July 1940, and on the same day unanimously requested Estonia to be "admitted" into the Soviet Union. Estonia was formally annexed into the Soviet Union (USSR) on 6 August 1940, and the new administrative subunit of the USSR was named the Estonian Soviet Socialist Republic (Estonian SSR). The 1940 occupation and annexation of Estonia into the Soviet Union was considered illegal and never officially recognized by Great Britain, the United States, Canada, France and most other democracies.

===== Soviet terror =====
During the first year of Soviet occupation (1940–1941) over 8,000 people, including most of the country's leading politicians and military officers, were arrested. About 2,200 of the arrested were executed in Estonia, while most others were moved to prison camps in Russia, from where very few were later able to return alive. On 19 July 1940, the Commander-in-chief of the Estonian Army Johan Laidoner was arrested by the NKVD, and subsequently deported together with his wife to Penza, Russia. Laidoner died in captivity in a Soviet prison Camp in Vladimir, Russia on 13 March 1953. President of Estonia, Konstantin Päts was arrested and deported by the Soviets to Ufa, Russia on 30 July 1940, he died in captivity in a psychiatric hospital in Kalinin (now Tver) in Russia in 1956. 800 Estonian officers, about a half of the total, were executed or starved to death in Soviet prison camps.

On 14 June 1941, when June deportation took place simultaneously in all three Baltic countries, about 10,000 Estonian civilians were deported to Siberia and other remote areas of the Soviet Union, where most of them perished within the next couple of years. Of the 32,100 Estonian men who were forcibly relocated to Russia under the pretext of mobilisation into the Red Army after the German invasion of the Soviet Union in 1941, nearly 40 percent died within the next year in the "labour battalions" through hunger, cold and overworking. During the first Soviet occupation of 1940–41 about 500 Jews were deported to Siberia.

=== Soviet occupation of 1944–1991 ===
Soviet forces reconquered Estonia in the autumn of 1944 after fierce battles in the northeast of the country on the Narva river and on the Tannenberg Line (Sinimäed). In 1944, in the face of the country being re-occupied by the Red Army, 80,000 people fled from Estonia by sea to Finland and Sweden, becoming war refugees and later, expatriates. 25,000 Estonians reached Sweden and a further 42,000 Germany. During the war about 8,000 Estonian Swedes and their family members had emigrated to Sweden. After the retreat of Germans, about 30,000 Estonian partisans remained in hiding in the Estonian forests, further on leading a massive guerrilla war. In 1949, 27,650 Soviet troops still led the war against the local partisans. Only the 1949 mass deportation when about 21,000 people were taken away broke the basis of the partisan movement. 6600 partisans gave themselves up in November 1949. Later on the failure of the Hungarian uprising broke the resistance morale of the 700 men still remaining under cover. According to the Soviet data, up to 1953, 20,351 partisans were disarmed. Of these, 1510 perished in the battles. During that period, 1,728 members of the Red Army, NKVD and the militia were killed by the "forest brothers". August Sabbe, the last surviving Forest Brother in Estonia, was discovered and killed by KGB agents in 1978.

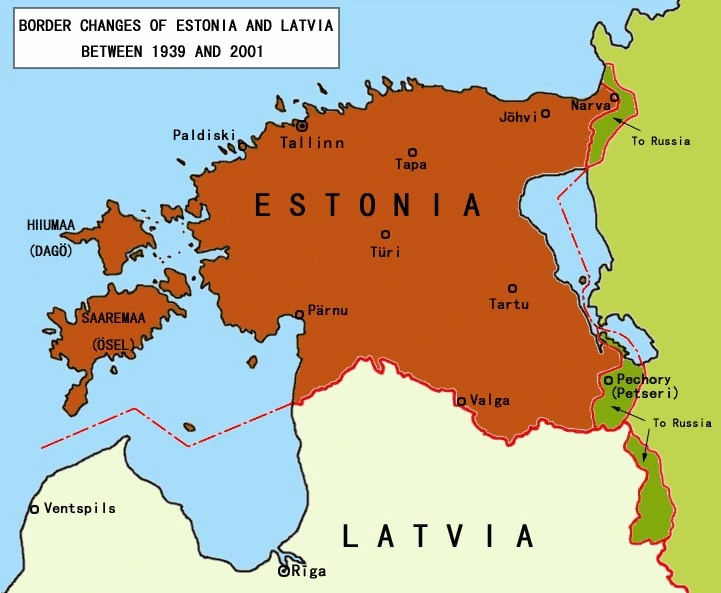
Border changes of Estonia after World War II

During the first post-war decade of Soviet regime, Estonia was governed by Moscow via Russian-born Estonian governors. Born into the families of native Estonians in Russia, the latter had obtained their Red education in the Soviet Union during the Stalinist repressions at the end of the 1930s. Many of them had fought in the Red Army (in the Estonian Rifle Corps), few of them had mastered the Estonian language.

Although the United States and the United Kingdom, the allies of the USSR against Germany during World War II, recognized the occupation of the Republic of Estonia by USSR at Yalta Conference in 1945 de facto, the governments of the rest of the western democracies did not recognize the seizure of Estonia by the USSR in 1940 and in 1944 de jure according to the Sumner Welles' declaration of 23 July 1940; such countries recognized Estonian diplomats and consuls who still functioned in many countries in the name of their former governments. These ageing diplomats persisted in this anomalous situation until the ultimate restoration of Estonia's independence in 1991.

The first freely elected parliament during the Soviet era in Estonia had passed independence resolutions on 8 May 1990, and renamed Estonian SSR to the Republic of Estonia. During the 1991 Soviet coup d'état attempt, on 20 August 1991 the Estonian parliament issued the declaration of the restoration of the country's full independence. On 6 September 1991, the State Council of the Soviet Union recognized the independence of Estonia., immediately followed by the international recognitions of the Republic of Estonia.

In 1992, Heinrich Mark, the prime minister of the Republic of Estonia in duties of the president in exile, presented his credentials to the newly elected President of Estonia Lennart Meri. The last Russian troops withdrew from Estonia in August 1994.

=== Estonia and Russian Federation ===
Russian-Estonian relations were re-established in January 1991, when the presidents Boris Yeltsin of Russian SFSR and Arnold Rüütel of Estonia met in Tallinn and signed a treaty governing the relations of the two countries after the anticipated independence of Estonia from the Soviet Union. The treaty guaranteed the right to freely choose their citizenship for all residents of the former Estonian SSR.

Russia re-recognized the Republic of Estonia on 24 August 1991, after the failed Soviet coup attempt, as one of the first countries to do so. Diplomatic relations were established on 24 October 1991. The Soviet Union recognized the independence of Estonia on 6 September.

With the dissolution of the Soviet Union in December 1991, the Russian Federation became an independent country. Russia was widely accepted as the Soviet Union's successor state in diplomatic affairs and it assumed the USSR's permanent membership and veto in the UN Security Council; see Russia's membership in the United Nations.

Estonia's ties with Boris Yeltsin weakened after the Russian leader's initial show of solidarity with the Baltic states in January 1991. Issues surrounding the withdrawal of Russian troops from the Baltic republics and Estonia's denial of automatic citizenship to persons who settled in Estonia in 1941–1991 and their offspring ranked high on the list of points of contention.

==== Withdrawal of Russian troops 1991–95 ====
Immediately after regaining the independence, Estonia started to insist that the Soviet Union (and later Russia) should withdraw their troops from Estonian territory and that the process should be completed by the end of the year. The Soviet government responded that withdrawal could not be completed before 1994 due to lack of available housing.

In the fall of 1991 the Soviet Union claimed Estonia's new citizenship policy, still in the process of being developed, was a violation of human rights. Under the citizenship policy, most of the country's large (mainly Russophone) minority of Soviet immigrants arriving between 1941 and 1991, as well as their offspring, were denied automatic citizenship. They could gain citizenship through a naturalisation process that included tests on Estonian and the constitution, as well as a long-time residency requirement. The Soviet government linked further withdrawal of troops from Estonia to a satisfactory change in Estonia's citizenship stance. In response, Estonia denied the accusations of violations of human rights and invited more than a dozen international fact-finding groups to visit the country for verification. In January 1992, some 25,000 Russian troops were reported left in Estonia, the smallest contingent in the Baltic states. Still, more than 800 square kilometres of land, including an inland artillery range, remained in the Russian military's hands. More than 150 battle tanks, 300 armored vehicles, and 163 military aircraft also remained.

On 1 July 1993, angered by Estonia's Aliens Act, Russia's Supreme Soviet passed a resolution "on measures in connection with the violation of human rights on the territory of the Estonian Republic", calling for sanctions against Estonia, including a complete halt of the troop pullout.

As the propaganda war and negotiations dragged on, Estonia, Latvia and Lithuania gained international support for their position on troop withdrawal at a July 1992 summit of the CSCE in Helsinki. The final communiqué called on Russia to act "without delay... for the early, orderly and complete withdrawal" of foreign troops from the Baltic states. Resolutions also were passed in the United States Senate in 1992 and 1993 linking the issue of troop withdrawals to continued United States aid to Russia.

Yet, Estonian and Russian negotiators remained deadlocked throughout 1993. At several points, President Yeltsin and other Russian officials called an official halt to the pullout, but the unofficial withdrawal of forces continued. By the end of 1992, about 16,000 troops remained. A year later, that number was down to fewer than 3,500, and more than half of the army bases had been turned over to Estonian defense officials. The Estonian and Russian sides continued to disagree, primarily over the pace of Russia's withdrawal from the town of Paldiski, on the northern coast some thirty-five kilometers west of Tallinn. The Soviet navy had built a submarine base there that included two nuclear submarine training reactors. Russian officials maintained that dismantling the reactor facility would take time; Estonia demanded faster action along with international supervision of the process.

It was not until 31 August 1994 that the last Russian troops left Estonia, as Presidents Boris Yeltsin and Lennart Meri had signed an agreement on 26 July 1994 for the complete withdrawal of Russian troops. The last Russian warship, carrying ten T-72 tanks, departed in August 1994. However, Russia was to retain control of the reactor facility in Paldiski until September 1995. On 30 September 1995 the decommissioning of the Paldiski nuclear base was completed.

==== Controversies ====
===== 1939–40 controversy =====
During Perestroika, the reassessment era of Soviet history in USSR, in 1989 the USSR condemned the 1939 secret protocol between Nazi Germany and itself that had led to the invasion and occupation of the three Baltic countries. The collapse of the Soviet Union led to the restoration of the Republic of Estonia's sovereignty (See History of Estonia: Regaining independence.) According to the Government of Estonia, the European Court of Human Rights, EU, USA Estonia remained occupied by the Soviet Union until restoration of its independence in 1991 and the 48 years of Soviet occupation and annexation was never recognized as legal by the Western democracies.

Russian government and officials continue to maintain that the Soviet annexation of the Baltic states was legitimate and that the Soviet Union liberated the countries from the Nazis. They state that the Soviet troops had entered the Baltic countries in 1940 following the agreements and with the consent of the governments of the Baltic republics. They maintain that the USSR was not in a state of war and was not waging any combat activities on the territory of the three Baltic states, therefore, the argument goes, the word 'occupation' can not be used. "The assertions about [the] 'occupation' by the Soviet Union and the related claims ignore all legal, historical and political realities, and are therefore utterly groundless." (Russian Foreign Ministry)

However the fact was that consent was coerced after Soviet troops were massed on the border. The Soviet 8th army was dispatched to Pskov on 14 September 1939, and the mobilized 7th army placed under the Leningrad Military District. On 26 September, the Leningrad Military District was ordered to "start concentrating troops on the Estonian-Latvian border and to finish that operation on 29 September." The order noted, "for the time of starting the attack a separate directive will be issued." Altogether, by the beginning of October 1939, the Soviets had amassed along the Estonia-Latvia border 437,325 troops, 3,635 artillery pieces, 3,052 tanks, 421 armored vehicles and 21,919 cars.

According to the American author Thomas Ambrosio, the core of the current controversies lay in the Kremlin's rhetorical response to external criticisms of Russia's own democratic and human rights record, where Moscow's harsh denunciations of Estonia which are far disproportionate to Tallinn's actual policies, are intended to put the West on the defensive rather than describe the realities within Estonia. Russia has made three general claims based upon exaggeration or outright misrepresentation as a part of their "accuse" strategy: the human rights of the Russian-speakers were being violated; Estonia has a "democratic deficit" because it did not allow non-citizens to vote in national elections; and that rejecting the legitimacy of the Soviet occupation was equivalent to glorifying Nazism.

===== Language and citizenship issues =====
During the Soviet period the share of Russophones in Estonia increased from less than a tenth to over a third, and to almost half in the capital Tallinn, and even to a majority in some districts in North East Estonia. (See Demographics of Estonia and Estonian SSR: Demographic changes.) In contrast to the long-standing pre-World War II Russian minority in Estonia, these were Soviet economic migrants. Russian was an official language in parallel to, and in practice often instead of, Estonian in Estonian SSR and there were no integration efforts during the Soviet time, resulting in considerable groups of people knowing very little or no Estonian. After Estonia re-established independence, Estonian again became the only official language.

The mass deportations of ethnic Estonians during the Soviet era together with migration into Estonia from other parts of the Soviet Union resulted in the share of ethnic Estonians in the country decreasing from 88% in 1934 to 62% in 1989. (See Demographics of Estonia.) In 1992, the Citizenship Act of the Republic of Estonia was reinstated according to the pre-Soviet invasion status quo in 1940. Throughout the years of occupations (the major democracies of the world never accepted the forcible incorporation of the Baltic States by the USSR in 1940), the pre-Soviet invasion Estonian citizens and their descendants never lost their citizenship, regardless of their ethnic origin, be it Estonian, Russian (8.2% of the citizenry by the 1934 census), German or any other, according to the jus sanguinis principle. Conditions for acquiring and receiving Estonian citizenship for post-1940 settlers and their descendants in Estonia are an examination in knowledge of the Estonian language and an examination in knowledge of the Constitution of Estonia and the Law. Applicants for Estonian citizenship who were born prior to 1 January 1930, or hearing or speech disabled, permanently disabled, et cetera, are exempt from the requirements.

Currently about a third of Estonia's Russophones are Estonian citizens, another third have Russian citizenship. At the same time in 2006 around 9% of Estonia's residents were of undefined citizenship. While there have been calls for the return of all Estonia's Russians to Russia, the Government of Estonia has been adopting an integration policy, advocating an idea that Estonia's residents should possess at least a basic knowledge of the Estonian language.

People who arrived in the country after 1940 qualify for naturalization if they have general knowledge of Estonian language and the Constitution, have legally resided in Estonia for at least eight years, the last five of them permanently, have a registered place of residence in Estonia and a permanent legal income. Russia has repeatedly condemned Estonian citizenship laws and demanded that Estonia grant its citizenship without (or by a greatly simplified) naturalization procedure. The perceived difficulty of the language tests necessary for naturalisation has been one of the controversial issues.

In February 2002, Russian Deputy Foreign Minister Yevgeni Gussarov presented to Estonian ambassador Karin Jaani a non-paper list of seven demands to be fulfilled by Estonia in order to improve the relations of the two countries. These demands included making Russian an official language in the regions where the russophone minority was actually a majority, granting citizenship by naturalization to at least 20,000 residents annually, stopping prosecuting the persons who had been involved in the deportation of Estonians, officially registering the Russian Orthodox Church, providing secondary and higher education in Russian language.

===== Accusations of belittlement and glorification of fascism =====
There have been various allegations of Neo-fascism (i.e., Nazism in Soviet speech), glorification of Nazism and Estonia's collaboration with Germans in World War II, resurrection of Nazism and being pro-Nazi against Estonia by official spokesmen and Jewish religious leaders of Russia, as well as by international spokesmen and associations, including René van der Linden and Efraim Zuroff.

According to The Economist: What really annoys the Kremlin is that Estonians regarded the arrival of the Red Army in 1944–45 as the exchange of one ghastly occupation for another instead of a liberation. The Estonian Education Minister Tõnis Lukas has said "We do not glorify the Nazis in any way, but Moscow seems very upset that Estonia considers the Nazi era and Stalinism as equally evil and criminal regimes."

A monument had been erected by a private group in the seaside town of Pärnu in 2002. It honoured Estonian soldiers who fought the Red Army during World War II and was reported as "SS monument" by some news agencies, including BBC. The Monument was taken down before it was unveiled. In 2004 the monument was re-erected in the town of Lihula, however it was removed by the Estonian government after 9 days amid violent protests from some monument supporters. The monument depicts an Estonian soldier in a German-type military uniform, and according to a journalist of the Baltic Times, with a Waffen-SS (combat SS) unit emblem. However a semiotic analysis by professor Peeter Torop of University of Tartu, consulting for the Lihula police department, concluded that no Nazi or SS symbolics whatsoever appear in the bas-relief. The monument which bears the plaque "To Estonian men who fought in 1940-1945 against Bolshevism and for the restoration of Estonian independence" now resides at the Museum of Fight for Estonia's Freedom.

There are legitimate organizations representing Waffen SS veterans in Estonia, and former Waffen SS soldiers are paid pensions by the German government. While the Nuremberg Trials condemned the Waffen-SS as part of a criminal organisation, conscripts were exempted from that judgment due to being involuntarily mobilized. Conscripting natives of occupied territory is considered a war crime under the Geneva Convention. The 20th Waffen Grenadier Division of the SS (1st Estonian) is an example of such a conscript formation, the units cannot be accused of committing crimes against humanity.

According to The New York Times: "Many Russians have accused countries once under the Kremlin’s sway, including Estonia, of not pursuing a full account of some of their citizens' collaborations with the Nazis." Martin Arpo, superintendent of Security Police Board disagrees with this Russian view, saying "Both regimes were criminal and committed criminal acts and brought suffering to the Estonian people. But the local K.G.B. couldn’t find any more evidence against the Nazi collaborators. We haven’t found it either. And the K.G.B. was a much larger organization than we are and had powers and methods, shall we say, that are not available to a Western democratic country."

===== Human rights =====
The Organization for Security and Co-operation in Europe (OSCE) and the OSCE High Commissioner on National Minorities declared in 1993 that they cannot find a pattern of human rights violations or abuses in Estonia.

Kara Brown has claimed in her 1997 report at Indiana University newsletter that "the Russian government, disregarding the fact that Estonia's Russian speakers willingly have chosen to stay [in Estonia], has used the excuse of alleged minority-right infringements as justification for a possible armed invasion." She suggested that, once in Estonia, these Russian troops would 'secure' the rights of these Russian-speakers who live outside of their homeland. According to K. Brown this vow of 'support' only aggravates attempts being made by the Russian speakers to solve their political problems independently and jeopardizes the development of healthy foreign relations between Estonia and Russia. However, this "Russian Plan for Invasion of the Baltic States," (as published in The Baltic Independent in 1995), had never been implemented, nor its authenticity had been confirmed by the independent sources. Estonian media have repeatedly claimed that Russian politicians called for military action against Estonia to protect the "compatriots", most recently in 2007, this accusation had been fielded against Dmitry Rogozin during the Bronze Soldier crisis.

The Government of Russia, claimed (in 2005) that "there is discrimination against the Russian-speaking minority (not only ethnic Russians but also Russian-speaking Ukrainians, Belarusians and Jews)." The Federal Migration Service of Russia has supported a law that would set a language test for anyone planning to work in Russia for more than one year. "It is obvious that without knowledge of the Russian language it is impossible to integrate into Russian society," the Russian Migration Service has said.

With the restoration of Estonian independence in 1991 the Citizenship Law of 1938, based on the principle of jus sanguinis, came into force. Consequently, all Soviet immigrants who had moved into Estonian SSR, when Estonia was under Soviet occupation in 1940–1941 and 1944–1991, as well as to their descendants born before 1992 found themselves with neither Estonian nor Russian citizenship. Non-citizen parents can request expedited citizenship for their children born after 1992 if they have been residents of Estonia for five years. Continuity of citizenship applied automatically to Russophones who were citizens or descendants of citizens of Republic of Estonia prior 1940.

The European Centre for Minority Issues has also criticised what is sees as Estonia's treatment of its Russian population, and has condemned the ostensible lack of legal protection offered to minorities. The forum Development and Transition, which is sponsored by the United Nations, published an article in its newsletter in November 2005 where professor James Hughes argues that Latvia and Estonia employ a "sophisticated and extensive policy regime of discrimination" against their respective Russophone parts of the population. However, in that same newsletter Hughes arguments were opposed by former Latvian minister for social integration Nils Muižnieks who argued his views were simplistic and "similar to what Russian propaganda has been touting in international fora over the last 10 years".

Although the OSCE and other international organizations, such as the Finnish Helsinki Committee, have found the Citizenship Law to be satisfactory, the Russian Government and members of the local ethnic Russian community continued to criticize it as discriminatory, notably for its Estonian language requirements. In September 2003, a visiting NATO Parliamentary Assembly delegation concluded that the country had no major problems in treatment of its Russian minority.

In 2005, the Estonian prime minister Juhan Parts expressed concerns about alleged Russian violations of human and cultural rights of the Mari people, who are ethnically related to the Estonian people. Estonian Institute of Human Rights claims Russia persecutes Mari journalists and oppositions leaders. Several journalists have been killed while in the cultural sphere TV and radio programmes in Mari language in the autonomous Republic of Mari El are restricted to a minimum of a brief news segment on the TV and Mari language radio broadcasting has been severely curtailed as well. The EU subsequently passed a resolution strongly condemning the violations of human rights by the Russian authorities in Mari El.

==== Other issues ====
===== Orthodox Church controversy =====
A legal dispute went on between the Tallinn and Moscow governments since 1993, when the Estonian government re-registered the Estonian Orthodox Church under the jurisdiction of the Ecumenical (Constantinople) Patriarchate. This made it impossible to register the Estonian Orthodox Church of Moscow Patriarchate, which had collaborated with the Soviet occupation. The main issue was, which of the two owned the property of the Orthodox church in Estonia, held by the Moscow Patriarchate until 1923, then by the Church under the Ecumenical Patriarchate until the Soviet occupation of Estonia in 1940, and consequently handed to the Moscow Patriarchate by the Soviet government. Estonian Orthodox Church of the Moscow Patriarchate was registered in Estonia in April 2002.

===== Territorial issues =====
After the dissolution of the Soviet Union Estonia had hoped for the return of more than 2,000 square kilometers of territory annexed to Russia after World War II in 1945. The annexed land had been within the borders Estonia approved by Russia in the 1920 Tartu Peace Treaty. However, the Boris Yeltsin government disavowed any responsibility for acts committed by the Soviet Union.

After signing the border treaty by the corresponding foreign minister in 2005, it was ratified by the Estonian government and President. The Russian side interpreted the preamble as giving Estonia a possibility for future territorial claim, and Vladimir Putin notified Estonia that Russia will not consider these. Negotiations were reopened in 2012 and the Treaty was signed in February 2014. Ratification is still pending.

===== Russia's attitude to Estonian accession to the NATO and the EU =====
When the Baltic states restored their independence in 1991 they demanded withdrawal of the Russian troops from their territory, where USSR has built various military installations. Later in the 1990s the Baltic states refused Russia's proposals of security guarantees in favor of NATO alliance. Estonia joined both the EU and NATO in 2004. NATO, particularly its expansion, is considered a threat in Russia.

===== Bronze Soldier of Tallinn controversy =====
The relocation of the Bronze Soldier of Tallinn and exhumation of the bodies buried from a square in the center of Tallinn to a military cemetery in April 2007 provoked a harsh Russian reaction. The Federation Council, on 27 April, approved a statement concerning the monument, which urges the Russian authorities to take the "toughest possible measures" against Estonia. First Deputy Prime Minister Sergey Ivanov said that adequate measures, primarily, economic ones, should be taken against Estonia. Belittling the World War II heroes' feats and desecrating monuments erected in their memory leads to discord and mistrust between countries and peoples, Russian president Vladimir Putin said on Victory Day 2007. In the days following the relocation, the Embassy of Estonia in Moscow was besieged by protesters, including pro-Kremlin youth organisations Nashi and the Young Guard of United Russia. Estonia's president Toomas Hendrik Ilves expressed his astonishment that Russia has — despite the promises of foreign minister Lavrov — not taken actions to protect the diplomatic personnel. On 2 May, a small group of protesters attempted to disrupt a press conference the Estonian ambassador to Russia, Marina Kaljurand was holding at the offices of the Moscow newspaper, Argumenty i Fakty, but were held back by security guards. The Russian Ministry of Foreign Affairs reported that the ambassador confirmed to them that her bodyguard used pepper spray against the protesters. Estonian foreign minister Urmas Paet suggested to consider calling off the EU-Russia Summit that was due to take place on 18 May.

===== Railway works =====
On 3 May 2007, Russia announced plans for repairs to railway lines to Estonia, disrupting oil and coal exports to Estonian ports. In July Russian Minister of Transport Igor Levitin announced that Russia was planning to stop all oil transit through Estonian ports and use Russian ports instead.

===== Cyberattacks on Estonia =====
A series of distributed denial of service cyber attacks began on 27 April 2007 that swamped websites of Estonian organizations, including Estonian parliament, banks, ministries, newspapers and broadcasters, amid the Estonian-Russian row about the Bronze Soldier of Tallinn relocation. Estonian officials accused Russia of unleashing cyberwar.

===== Exhibition dedicated to the Ukrainian Insurgent Army =====
An exhibition dedicated to the Ukrainian Insurgent Army opened in Tallinn in October 2009 was heavily criticised by Russian embassy in Estonia. "The UPA acted like war criminals and not as fighters for freedom as they are being portrayed in retrospect. We spoke of our negative view on the exhibition opened by the Estonian Foreign Ministry and voiced our reasons", Russian Embassy Press Attache Maria Shustitskaya told Estonian television.

===== Abduction of Estonian security official =====
On 5 September 2014 Estonian Internal Security Service official Eston Kohver was abducted at gunpoint from the border near the Luhamaa border checkpoint by Russian forces and taken to Russia. The abduction was preceded by jamming of Estonian communications and the use of a smoke grenade. Estonia also found evidence that a struggle had taken place. President Toomas Hendrik Ilves called the incident "unacceptable and deplorable". The incident occurred during the ongoing invasion of Ukraine and following a visit to Estonia by US president Barack Obama. Russia admitted that they have detained Kohver, but claimed that he was in Russian territory at the time he was taken. In August 2015 he was sentenced to 15 years in prison.

On 26 September 2015, an exchange deal between Russian and Estonian governments was made: Kohver was handed over to Estonia for convicted Russian spy Aleksei Dressen.

==== Relationship during the Russo-Ukrainian War ====
From 1940 until 1991, Estonia was under Soviet occupation, during which a large number of ethnic Russians migrated to the republic. The 2014 Russian annexation of Crimea and the Russo-Ukrainian War have left many Estonians nervous that Russia might also attempt to reoccupy Estonia or annex parts of the country. Because of this, Estonia has responded to Russia with frequent large-scale national and volunteer military exercises along the Russia-Estonia border. Additionally, Estonian government officials have called upon NATO, who has pledged their support for Estonia in the effect of Russian encroachment, by sending individuals to take place in the military exercises along the border.

After the 2022 Russian invasion of Ukraine started, Estonia, as one of the EU countries, imposed sanctions on Russia, and Russia added all EU countries to the list of "unfriendly nations". Estonia joined other countries in spring 2022 in declaring a number of Russian diplomats Persona non grata. Estonia also introduced a ban on some media channels based in Russia.

In September 2022, Poland, Lithuania, Latvia, and Estonia decided to close entry for Russian citizens with Schengen visas, including those issued by third countries. Estonia also made it a criminal offence for anyone from Estonia going to fight for Russia, including Russian citizens living in Estonia.

On 18 October 2022, the Estonian parliament voted in favour of officially recognizing Russia as a terrorist state. The Riigikogu also called on the international community to adopt a similar position.

On 6 December 2022, Vadim Konoshchenok, a suspected FSB officer was arrested at the border with high tech electronic items and ammunition sourced in the US, additional goods were found in a warehouse Konoshchenok was renting. The USA sought his extradition, which was granted and actioned in July 2023.

In January 2023, Estonian Foreign Ministry spokesman Mihkel Tamm announced Estonia's intention to seize $21.4 million in Russian assets in Estonia and deliver it to Ukraine. Estonia is working with European Commission on plans to seize Russian assets frozen in the European Union which are estimated to be in the hundreds of billions of dollars.

Estonia announced the expulsion of 21 Russian diplomats and technical staff in January 2023 and encouraged other European Union countries to follow suit. In response, Russia responded by downgrading its relations with Estonia and expelling the Estonian ambassador, Estonia responded in kind.

On 19 August 2026, Estonia announced that it was investigating Russian links to an arson attack on a building belong to defense company Milrem Robitics, and on 30 September they formally blamed Moscow.

On 15 November 2026, Prime Minister Kristen Michal announced the closure of the border connecting the two states via three border crossings, following an attempted arson attack attributed to Russian intelligence services, marking the second such incident since August.

==== Meetings ====
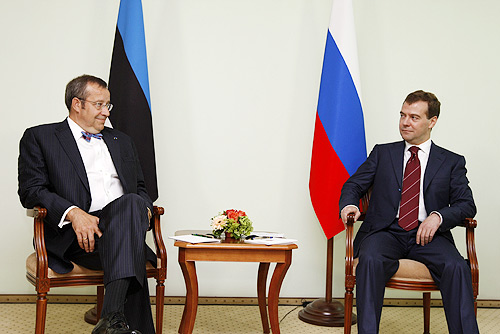
Russian president Dmitry Medvedev and Estonian president Toomas Hendrik Ilves met in Khanty-Mansiysk on 28 June 2008.

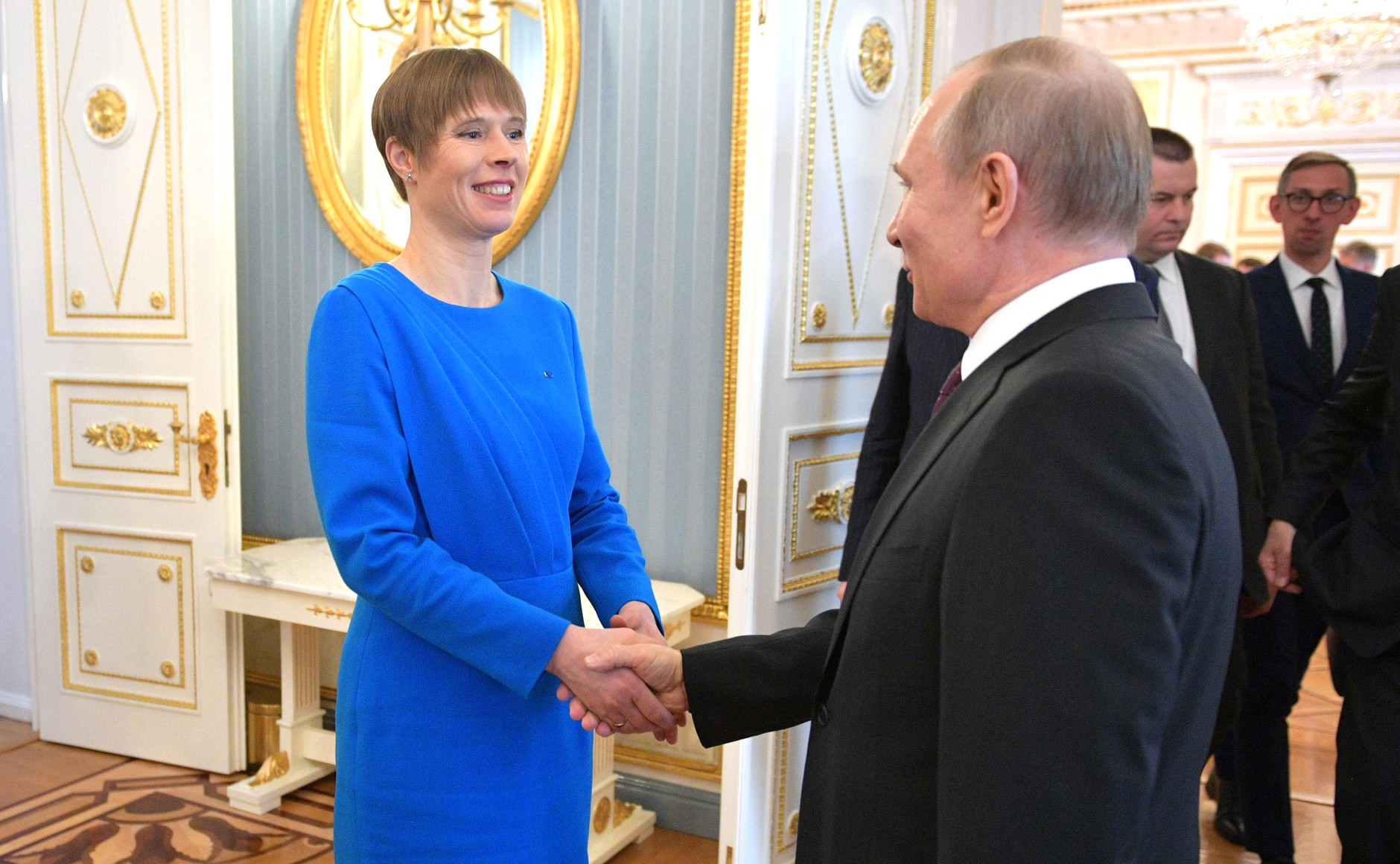
Kersti Kaljulaid with Vladimir Putin in Moscow on 18 April 2019.

The first meeting between Estonian and Russian leaders was between Boris Yeltsin and Lennart Meri.

Russian president Dmitry Medvedev and Estonian president Toomas Hendrik Ilves met in Khanty-Mansiysk in June 2008 at the 5th World Congress of Finno-Ugric Peoples, marking the first formal meeting between leaders of the two states in fourteen years. Putin briefly spoke with President Arnold Rüütel in 2005 with Patriarch Alexy II of Moscow (a native of Tallinn himself). On the meeting between the two presidents, Sergey Prikhodko, Aide to the Russian President, stated that "(t)here have been much warmer meetings. During the meeting, Ilves stated that rhetoric from both countries should be toned down, with Medvedev responding by saying that the Estonian President often made harsh statements against Russia, whereas he did not do the same about Estonia." In his speech at the Congress, Ilves states "Freedom and democracy were our choice 150 years ago. Even poets didn’t dream about state independence at that time. Many Finno-Ugric peoples haven’t made their choice yet". This led Russian representatives to believe that Ilves was calling for the breakup of the Russian state. Konstantin Kosachev, the chairman of the International Affairs Committee in the State Duma, in response stated that Estonia and the European Parliament had demanded investigations into the 2005 attacks on a Mari activist, and had used the attack as evidence of discrimination of the Mari people in Russia, yet ignored calls for investigations on attacks on ethnic Russians, which included the stabbing to death of one, in the riots around the 2007 Bronze Soldier controversy. Kosachev's speech led Ilves and the rest of the Estonian delegation to leave the conference hall in protest. Ilves later stated that "to read into the speech anything requires a hyperactive and distorted imagination".

On 18 April 2019, Estonian president Kersti Kaljulaid visited Moscow in an official state visit, the first by an Estonian leader since 2011. In her meetings with President Vladimir Putin, she invited him to visit Tartu for the 2020 World Congress of Finno-Ugric Peoples. During the visit, she attended the re-opening of the Estonian Embassy in Moscow. The meeting was arranged by Kaljulaid and Putin when the two spoke briefly at the Armistice Day commemorations in Paris the previous November.

== Trade ==
In 2021 Estonia exported $1.39 billion of goods to Russia with Palm oil being the main product. Russia exported $3.88 billion to Estonia with refined petroleum the top item. Between 1995 and 2021 Estonian exports to Russia rose an average of 5.75% p.a. with Russian exports rising by an average of 9.31% p.a. in the same period.

Decisions taken by Estonia and EU sanctions, following the 2022 Russian invasion of Ukraine, have reduced the level of trade by 2023, especially imports by Estonia of Russian energy goods.

== Public opinion ==
According to Levada Center Russian research institute, in 2007, Estonia was considered an enemy of Russia by 60 percent of Russia's citizens (cf. 28% in 2006, 32% in 2005), more than any other country in the world, followed by Georgia, Latvia and United States. The poll was conducted two weeks after the Bronze Soldier relocation to a military cemetery and exhumation of the bodies buried there and the Bronze Night riots.

== See also ==
- History of Russians in Estonia
- Foreign relations of Estonia
- Russian influence operations in Estonia
- Estonia–Russia border
- List of ambassadors of Russia to Estonia
- Russia–European Union relations
- Estonia–Ukraine relations
