= Anti-Estonian sentiment =

Dislike or fear of Estonia, its people or its culture

Anti-Estonian sentiment generally describes dislike, discrimination and/or hate of the/against/towards Estonian people or the Republic of Estonia and is typically propagated by the Russian government and media.

== Russia ==
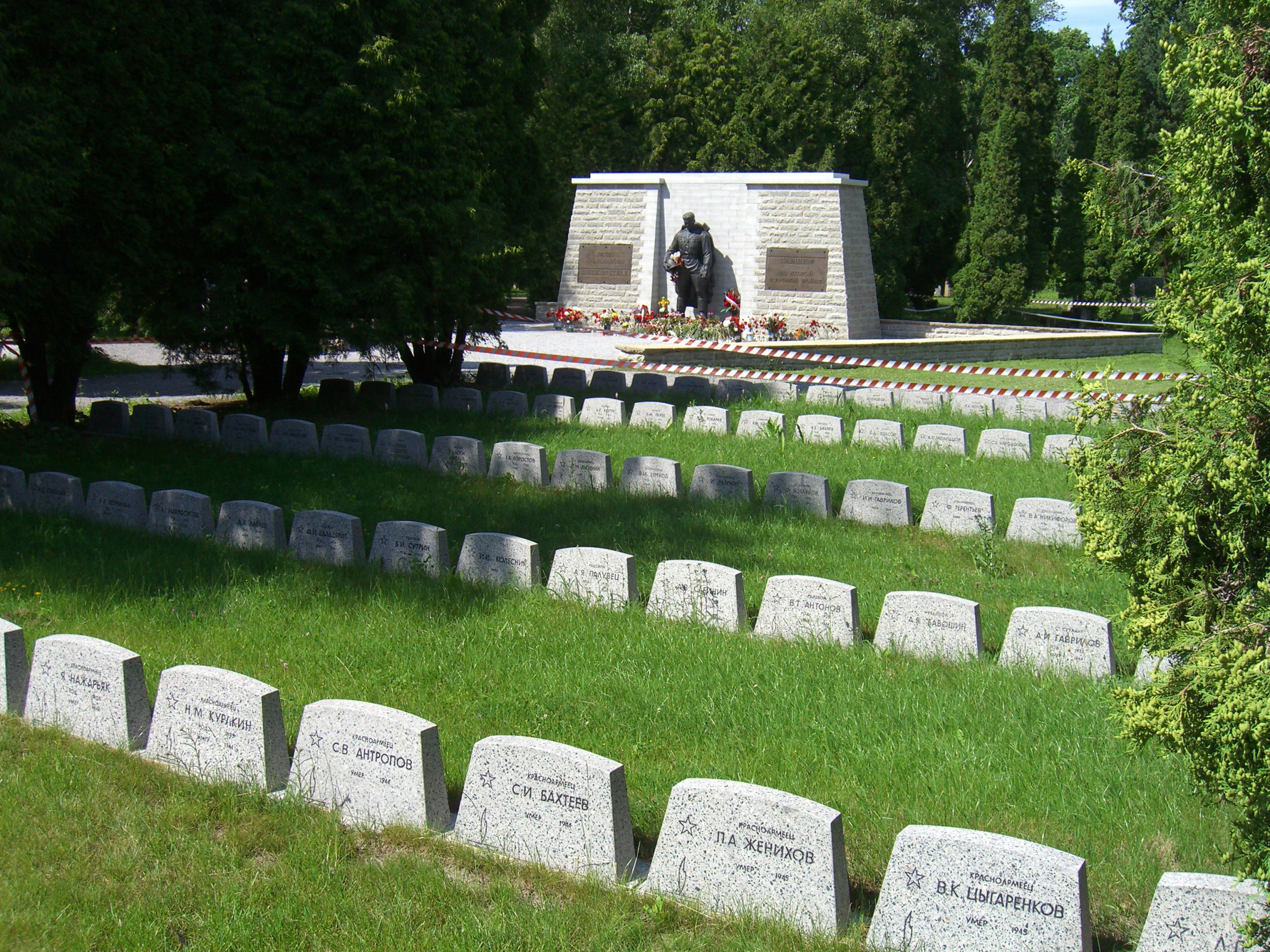
The Bronze Soldier monument, with the stone structure reconstructed, at its new permanent location, June 2007

Christopher Walker and Robert Orttung allege that Kremlin-controlled sectors of the Russian media took advantage of anti-Estonian sentiment during Estonia's 2007 relocation of the Bronze Soldier, a Soviet-era monument to Russia's victory over Germany in the Second World War, originally called "Monument to the Liberators of Tallinn". At various times following Estonia's independence from the Soviet Union, Russian national television has effectively shaped anti-Estonian sentiment with the state-controlled media redoubling their anti-Estonian campaign after specific events that displease Moscow.

According to Lilia Shevtsova, Senior Associate at the Russian Domestic Politics and Political Institutions Program Chair of the Carnegie Moscow Center, anti-Estonian sentiment was intentionally escalated by Kremlin in its "search for enemies", however she also notes that even Russian democrats took Estonia's removal of the statue immediately before Victory Day to be an affront to the Russian national honour.

The Russian government used its state controlled media to propagate anti-Estonian sentiment in order to encourage ethnic Russian outrage, leading to coordinated waves of cyber attacks against Estonian internet infrastructure. The President of Estonia Toomas Hendrik Ilves stated at the time: "We are witnesses to the information war against Estonia which already reminds of an ideological aggression".

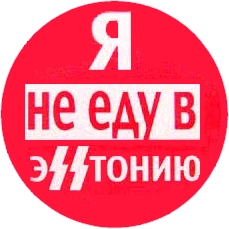
"I won't go to eSStonia" badge produced by Komsomolskaya Pravda as part of its Estonian boycott campaign. The SS refers to the Nazi German Schutzstaffel, commonly known as SS.

An anti-Estonian pejorative neologism, eSStonia, appeared in the Russian media, on Runet, and at the street protests in the midst of the Bronze Soldier controversy in 2007. The term, a portmanteau of Estonia and SS, is intended to portray Estonia as a neo-Nazi state.

In April 2007, some participants protested outside the Embassy of Estonia in Moscow, organized by the Russian youth organisation Nashi, carrying signs stating "Wanted. The Ambassador of the Fascist State of eSStonia" (Russian: «Разыскивается посол фашистского государства эSSтония»), referring to the then-Ambassador of Estonia to Russia Marina Kaljurand. In May 2007, members of the Young Guard of United Russia picketed the Consulate-General of Estonia in Saint Petersburg holding up pickets with slogans such as "eSStonia–the shame of Europe!" (Russian: «эSSтония — позор Европы!»). The use of eSStonia in protests by Nashi and the Young Guard determined the head of the Saint Petersburg youth branch of Yabloko to file a complaint with Yury Chaika, the Prosecutor General of Russia, asking for an investigation into a possible breach of Article 282: Incitement of National, Racial, or Religious Enmity of the Criminal Code of Russia.

In November 2007, Komsomolskaya Pravda, the biggest selling daily newspaper in Russia, ran a campaign asking readers to boycott travel to Estonia, Estonian goods and services. The campaign run under the slogan "I don't go to eSStonia" (Russian: Я не еду в эSSтонию). The Economist, in its editorial, called the term "a cheap jibe" by spelling the country's name eSStonia, President Ilves as IlveSS and Prime Minister Ansip as AnSSip, while noting the coining of the term Nashism to describe what they regard as the populist, pro-authoritarian and ultra-nationalist philosophy of Nashi, a pro-Kremlin youth movement, as an encouraging countermeasure.

In 2007, as a response to the possibility of removal of World War II graves (in the context of the Bronze Soldier controversy) Russian State Duma issued a statement accusing "the Estonian government's intention to continue its course of representing Nazism in a heroic light and justifying its ideology". In Russia, the youth movement Nashi has been noted for anti-Estonian sentiments among its members, often framed as "anti-fascism activities".

== See also ==
- Anti-Russian sentiment
- Estonia–Russia relations
