= Valeri Zentsov =

Russian spy (born 1946)

Valeri Zentsov (born 31 August 1946 in Berlin, russian Валерий Зенцов) is a Russian spy best known for recruiting Herman Simm in 1995.

Zentsov graduated from the 30th High School of Tallinn. After joining the KGB in 1969, he studied spycraft in Moscow in 1973–1975, specialising in scientific and technological espionage. Subsequently, Zentsov was based in Estonia, where he became the vice head of intelligence of the KGB branch in Estonia by 1988. Following the restoration of the Republic of Estonia, Zentsov was in 1992 classified as a Russian military retiree ranking as a polkovnik. As of 1998, Russia paid him a military pension of 1291.54 roubles per month. According to Kaitsepolitsei, instead of retiring Zentsov continued clandestine work for the Sluzhba Vneshney Razvedki, the foreign intelligence successor of KGB.

In 1999, Estonia denied Zentsov an extension of his residence permit, based on his employment as a commissioned officer of a foreign (i.e. Soviet) military. After the expiration of his last residence permit, he illegally resided in Estonia for 57 days, leading to his forced removal from the country by immigration authorities.
