= Embassy of Estonia, Moscow =

Diplomatic mission of Estonia to Russia

Embassy of Estonia in Moscow Посольство Эстонии в Москве Eesti Suursaatkond Moskvas
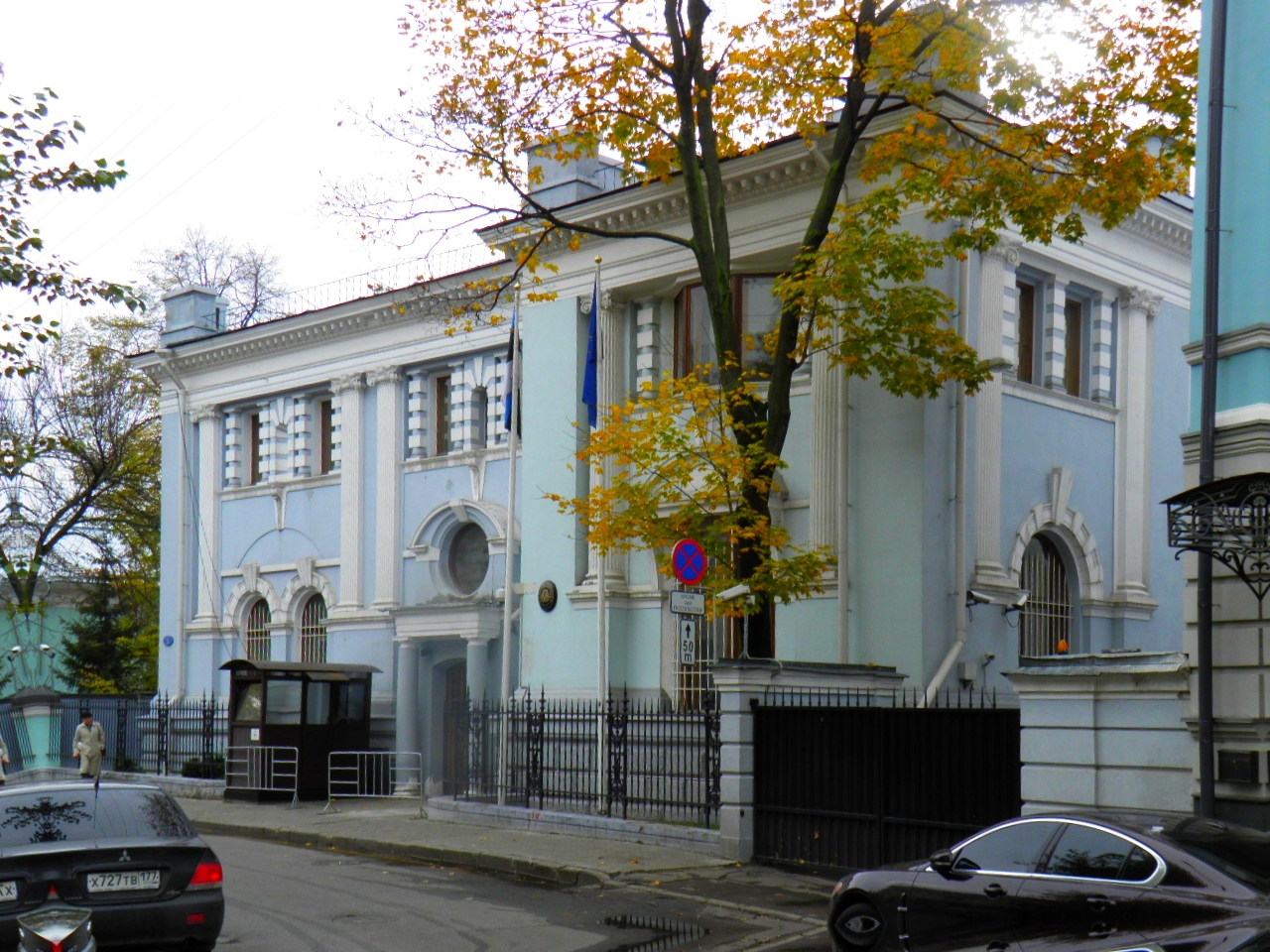
- Location: Moscow
- Address: 5 Maly Kislovsky Lane
- Coordinates: 55°45′19″N 37°36′8″E
- Ambassador: Marek Ühtegi

Embassy of Estonia in Moscow (Russian: Посольство Эстонии в Москве, Estonian: Eesti Suursaatkond Moskvas) is the chief diplomatic mission of Estonia in the Russian Federation. It is located at 5 Maly Kislovsky Lane (Russian: Малый Кисловский пер. 5) in the Presnensky District of Moscow.

== History ==
The mansion was built in 1903, for the family of publisher Vladimir Dumnov. In 1920, the mansion was transferred to the Estonian government and until 1940 the Embassy of the Republic of Estonia was located there. After the incorporation of Estonia into the USSR, the archives and property of the embassy were transferred to the NKVD and the People's Commissariat of Foreign Affairs. After that, it became the headquarters of the Permanent Representative of the Estonian SSR to the Council of Ministers of the USSR. In February 2014, Russia and Estonia signed an agreement on diplomatic real estate, according to which the building of the Estonian Embassy in Moscow was leased to Estonia for 99 years for 1 ruble per year. On 18 April 2019, Estonian President Kersti Kaljulaid visited Moscow on an official state visit, the first by an Estonian leader since 2011, during which she attended the re-opening of the embassy.

== See also ==
- Estonia–Russia relations
- Diplomatic missions in Russia
