= Aleksei Dressen =

Russian spy in Estonia

Aleksei Dressen (born 1968 in Riga) is a former Estonian Internal Security Service officer convicted for treason. He was convicted with cooperating with Russian intelligence service FSB. He is an ethnic Volga German.

== Biography ==
During Soviet rule of Estonia, Aleksei Dressen worked as a policeman in the Soviet militia. In 1993 he started working for the reestablished Estonian Security Police. In 1994 he lost his police ID. A year later there was a disciplinary charge for wrongful conduct at work. This happened several times during his career. In 1999 his salary was cut by 30% for two months.

Despite all this Aleksei Dressen managed to become a director of several different units in the Estonian Security Police.

Aleksei Dressen and his wife Viktoria were arrested on the morning of 22 February 2012 at Tallinn Airport. Viktoria was about to board a flight to Moscow. During the arrest a thumb drive full of information was seized. The chief architect behind Dressen's capture is considered to be the deputy chief of the Estonian Security Police Aleksander Toots. In 2012 Dressen was sentenced to 16 years in prison.

On 26 September 2015, he was handed over to Russia in exchange for Eston Kohver. The prisoners were exchanged in a manner reminiscent of Cold War spy exchanges, on a bridge over the Piusa River.
