= Herman Simm =

Estonian official, and convicted Russian spy

Herman Simm (born 29 May 1947) is a former chief of the Estonian Defence Ministry's security department and a convicted Russian spy.

The Simm case became the first since the restoration of Estonia's independence in 1991 in which an actual agent was identified, tried, and convicted of treason.

== Professional career and espionage ==
Simm was born in Suure-Jaani and was inducted into the Soviet Interior Ministry as a Militsiya officer in 1970 and worked in the Estonian SSR until 1991, reaching the rank of Polkovnik (Colonel). After Estonia's independence, during which he played a significant role in helping organize Estonian resistance to Russian military aggression, he held various positions at the Interior Ministry and the Police Board, including director general of the board, when he started work for the Defence Ministry in 1995 as head of the information analysis office of the defence policy department. In 2001, he was appointed head of the newly formed state secret protection department known as the National Security Authority (Estonian: Riiklik Julgeolekuamet) and was responsible for the protection of all classified communication between Estonia and its allies. As head of the Defence Ministry Security Department, Simm was tasked with coordinating the protection of state secrets. The department is also responsible for issuing access to classified information and for handling data from international organizations, including NATO, the European Union and Estonia's other defence partners. He also took part in the devising of EU and NATO information protection systems.

On September 21, 2008, Simm was arrested with his wife Heete Simm on suspicion of illegal collecting and communicating classified information to an unidentified foreign government.

It is believed that damage caused by Herman Simm was not limited to the security of Estonia. From 2001 to 2006, Simm regularly traveled abroad to negotiate agreements on the protection of classified information with member countries of NATO and the European Union. Herman Simm also participated in the development of intelligence security with NATO and the EU, where he invited other states to check their security systems. In June 2003, he was issued a diplomatic passport, provided to carriers transporting classified information. In November 2006, Herman Simm resigned from the post of head of the state secret protection department, but continued to work as adviser of the Minister of Defence, retaining access to classified information.

== Investigation and conviction ==
The criminal case was processed by Estonia's Public Prosecutor's Office and by the Security Police Board who co-operate with the Information Board and with the Ministry of Defence. (According to the Penal Code, treason is punishable by imprisonment of three to fifteen years.)

On 6 November 2008, the Estonian State Prosecutor's Office released some materials of the investigation, according to which Simm's handler may have been an officer of Russia's Foreign Intelligence Service (SVR) who had been using a false identity of an EU citizen.

On February 25, 2009, Simm pleaded guilty to treason and was sentenced to twelve and a half years imprisonment and the payment of EEK 20,155,000 (€1,288,000) in damages.

The Harju County Court did not specify which country Simm had handed the secrets to; but chief prosecutor Norman Aas said that Simm had "collected and forwarded classified Estonian and NATO information" to Russia's foreign intelligence service from 1995 until his arrest in 2008. Aas also said, "He passed on personal information on some Estonian individuals, something that may damage Estonia's interests."

It has been unofficially claimed that Estonia had been tipped off by another country. Security Police chief Raivo Aeg said Simm would meet three or four times a year in at least 15 European countries with his SVR handlers, identified as Valeri Zentsov and Sergey Jakovlev. Aeg also said that an international arrest warrant had been issued for the latter, who is also known under a fake Portuguese identity as Antonio de Jesus Amorett Graf.

== Bankruptcy ==
On March 23, 2009, Simm filed for personal bankruptcy. Simm has estimated the total value of his liquid assets at 5.4 million EEK (approx €340,000), but the Ministry of Defence, (upheld by the courts), claimed the total to be 21.6 million EEK, and Simm owes 2.1 million EEK to an unnamed bank. The court assigned Ly Müürsoo as Simm's temporary receiver and set the date of bankruptcy hearing to 17 April 2009. Meanwhile, Simm has been prohibited to realise any of his assets without a permission from the receiver.

Simm's bankruptcy proceedings are complicated by lack of a prenuptial agreement between Herman Simm and his wife Heete Simm.

On 23 April 2009, Harju County Court granted Simm's bankruptcy application, and declared Simm bankrupt.

== Political ramifications ==
On April 29, 2009, NATO ordered the expulsion of two Russian diplomats in what The Financial Times said was retaliation for Simm's activities. One of the expelled Russians was the son of Vladimir Chizhov, Russia's Ambassador to the European Union. He and the other diplomat who was expelled had been attached to Russia's mission to NATO, and are believed to have worked undercover as intelligence agents.

== Release on probation ==
Tartu County Court decided to release Simm early on probation with a ruling on December 5, 2019. The court sentenced him to probation until March 18, 2021. The court assessed his risk of recidivism as low and found that Simm's access to classified information potentially interesting for foreign states is incredibly limited. He was released on December 23, 2019, from Tartu Prison.
