= Boris Nartsissov =

American writer

Boris A. Nartssisov
- Born: February 14, 1905; Naskaftym, Kuznetskii Uyezd, Saratov Governorate
- Died: November 27, 1982 (aged 77); Washington, D.C., U.S.
- Occupations: Poet, translator

Boris Anatolevich Nartsissov (Russian: Борис Анатольевич Нарциссов; 14 February 1906 – 27 November 1982) was a Russian émigré poet.

== Biography ==
Nartsissov was born in the small village of Naskaftym (Russian:Наскафтым) to a family of medical doctors. His family fled the advancing Red Army to Estonia in 1919, where he studied at the University of Tartu and received a degree in chemistry. During World War II, he was moved to a displaced persons camp near Munich. After the end of the war, he lived in Tübingen until 1949, when he moved to Australia while working for the U.S. government as a chemist. From 1953 to 1959, he lived in Columbus, Ohio, after which he moved to Washington, D.C., where he remained until his death.

While living in the U.S., Nartsissov published six volumes of poetry and one short novel. He translated from both Estonian and English into Russian. His literary themes include mysticism, the supernatural, and the double. He favored ternary metres, particularly anapaestic.

== Selected publications ==
1958 Stikhi (Стихи); "Poems"

1961 Golosa (Голоса); "Voices"

1965 Pamjat' (Память); "Memory"

1969 Pod'jom (Подъём); "Ascent"

1974 Shakhmaty (Шахматы); "Chess"

1978 Zvjozdnaja Ptitsa (Звёздная птица); "Star Bird"

1983 Pis'mo Samomu Sebe (Письмо самому себе); "A Letter to Myself"
