= Estonian Defence League's Cyber Unit =

Estonian military unit

The Estonian Defence League’s Cyber Unit (Estonian: Küberkaitseliit, or KKL) is a group of units within certain malevs of the Estonian Defense League established in 2010. Created out of inspiration from the 2007 cyberattacks on Estonia and spearheaded by Informatics Scientist Ülo Jaaksoo, it focuses on the defense of the Estonian state and private telecommunications infrastructure from outside-derived cyberattacks, and mostly employs the volunteer participation of IT professionals.

The KKL is headquartered on the grounds of the Tartu and Tallinn malevs, and it is jointly headed in Tallinn by Jaan Priisalu and in Tartu by Kuido Külm.

== Purpose ==
The KKL's mission is to protect Estonia's high-tech way of life, protecting the information infrastructure, and thus carrying out broad defense goals.

- highly skilled IT professionals with volunteer youth organizations;
- cybersecurity of critical information infrastructure to increase the level of awareness through the rise and dissemination of best practices;
- network, which brings together public and private sector crises of competence, organizational development, and act in times of crisis;
- Members of the continuous training and training:
  - Members of the preparation;
  - action plans;
  - prevention and increasing cyber activities;
- participation in cybersecurity-related international cooperation networks

== Proposed conscription ==
Defence minister Jaak Aaviksoo has publicly suggested his desire for the spread of KKL units to other branches as an option for those who are conscripted to the Estonian military.

== See also ==
- CCDCOE (NATO)
- National Cyber Security Centre (disambiguation)
