= List of intelligence agencies of Germany =

The following is a list of intelligence agencies of Germany.

== Currently active ==
- Federal Intelligence Service (BND) (German: Bundesnachrichtendienst): foreign and military intelligence
- Military Counterintelligence Service (MAD) (German: Militärischer Abschirmdienst): (defensive) counterintelligence within the Bundeswehr and the Federal Ministry of Defence.
- Federal Office for the Protection of the Constitution (BfV) (German: Bundesamt für Verfassungsschutz): national domestic intelligence
  - State Offices for the Protection of the Constitution (LfV) (German: Landesbehörden für Verfassungsschutz): domestic intelligence for the 16 subnational states

Besides that there are several other military and civilian agencies in Germany which do not have the status of an intelligence service, but have certain responsibilities similar to those of intelligence services or include close cooperation with German intelligence services:

- Strategic Reconnaissance Command (KSA) (German: Kommando Strategische Aufklärung): central functional command for military intelligence, military signals intelligence and geospatial intelligence, part of Cyber and Information Domain Service. Subordinate units include Centre for Cyber Operations and Centre for Operational Communication (the latter being responsible for military Psychological Operations and Information Operations).
- Central Office for Information Technology in the Security Sector (ZITiS) (German: Zentrale Stelle für Informationstechnik im Sicherheitsbereich): cryptanalysis and digital surveillance. Mainly works as a support and research agency for law enforcement and BfV.
- Federal Office for Information Security (BSI) (German: Bundesamt für Sicherheit in der Informationstechnik): information security and cyber security.
- Federal Criminal Police Office (BKA) (German: Bundeskriminalamt): criminal and national security intelligence. Not actually an intelligence agency, but resembles one in a few aspects (the department State Protection (German: Staatsschutz) investigates police-relevant political extremism, terrorism and espionage; recently new departments for cyber crime and Islamist terrorism were created).
- State Criminal Police Offices (LKA) (German: Landeskriminalämter): State police services have their own police units responsible for State Protection. Further responsibilities for state protection may be distributed to regional police entities within the states.
- Federal Police (BPOL) (German: Bundespolizei): Federal (primarily) uniformed police service with responsibility for border, aviation and railway security; one of its legal responsibilities is the support of the BfV on the field of radio technology, including signals intelligence to identify foreign intelligence services communication within Germany.
- Customs Investigation Bureau (ZKA) (German: Zollkriminalamt): investigation and analysis of certain financial crimes, cases of arms proliferation and drug trafficking. Central organizational entity for the regional branches of federal customs investigation service.
- Financial Intelligence Unit (FIU) (German: Zentralstelle für Finanztransaktionsuntersuchungen): Central agency for the fight against money laundering and terrorist financing. Formerly an entity of the BKA and set up in 2017 as a subdirectorate of the ZKA until becoming a division of the General Customs Directorate in 2021.

== Former agencies ==
Prussia/German Empire

- Prussian Secret Police (German: Preußische Geheimpolizei): Precursor of the Gestapo between 1851 and 1933.
- Naval Intelligence Service (N, MND) (German: Marinenachrichtendienst, also Nachrichten-Abteilung): Intelligence department of the Imperial German Navy.
- Department IIIb (German: Abteilung III b): Military intelligence of the German General Staff of Imperial Germany.

Nazi Germany

- Foreign Armies East (German: Abteilung Fremde Heere Ost). Army intelligence analysis service of Nazi Germany.
- Defense (German: Abwehr): Army intelligence gathering service of Nazi Germany.
- Observation Service (B-Dienst, χB-Dienst, MND III) (German: Beobachtungsdienst): Naval intelligence service of Nazi Germany.
- Secret State Police (Gestapo) (German: Geheime Staatspolizei): Secret police of Nazi Germany and German-occupied Europe.
- Secret Field Police (GFP) (German: Geheime Feldpolizei): Secret military police of the Wehrmacht.
- Security Service (SD) (German: Sicherheitsdienst): Intelligence agency of the SS and the Nazi Party. See also: Reich Security Main Office

West Germany

- Gehlen Organization ("The Org", "Zipper"): Precursor to the Bundesnachrichtendienst (Federal Intelligence Service).
- Office/Center for Intelligence of the Federal Armed Forces (ANBw/ZNBw) (German: Amt/Zentrum für Nachrichtenwesen der Bundeswehr): Military intelligence analysis organization of the Bundeswehr. The majority of the tasks of ZNBw was taken over by the Bundesnachrichtendienst after an agreement between the Federal Ministry of Defence and the Federal Chancellery.

East Germany

- Ministry for State Security (MfS, "Stasi") (German: Ministerium für Staatssicherheit): State Security Service of the German Democratic Republic.
- Main Directorate for Reconnaissance (HVA) (German: Hauptverwaltung Aufklärung): Foreign Intelligence Service of the German Democratic Republic.
- Military Intelligence of the National People's Army (MIL-ND) (German: Militärische Aufklärung der Nationalen Volksarmee): Military Intelligence Service of the German Democratic Republic.

== See also ==
- Club de Berne
