= Cyberspace Defense Forces =

- Wojska Obrony Cyberprzestrzeni
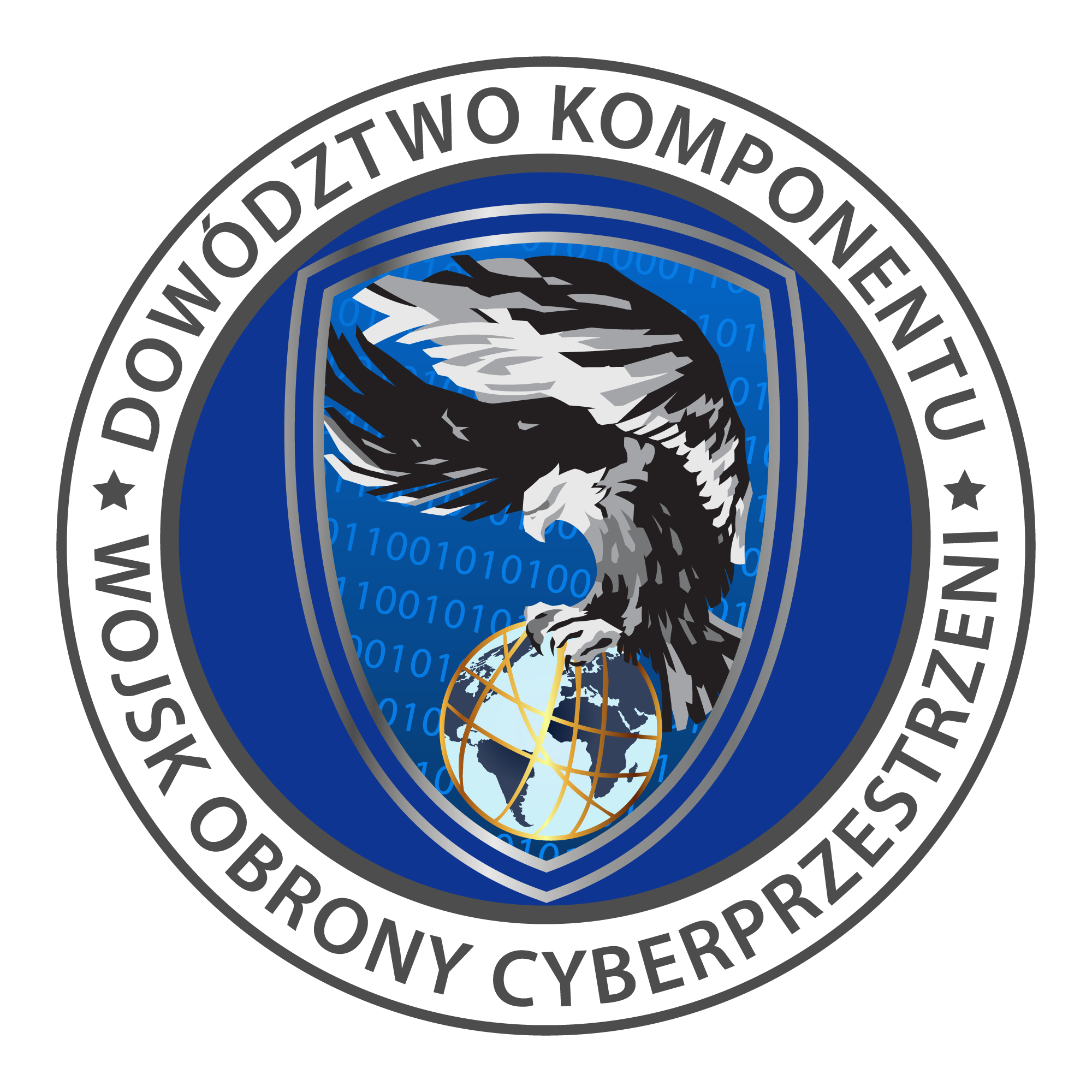
- Active: from February 8, 2022
- Country: Poland
- Nickname(s): CYBER

Commanders
- Current commander: general Karol Molenda

Insignia
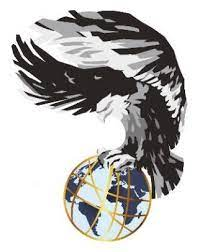
- Distinctive unit insignia of the CDF Command

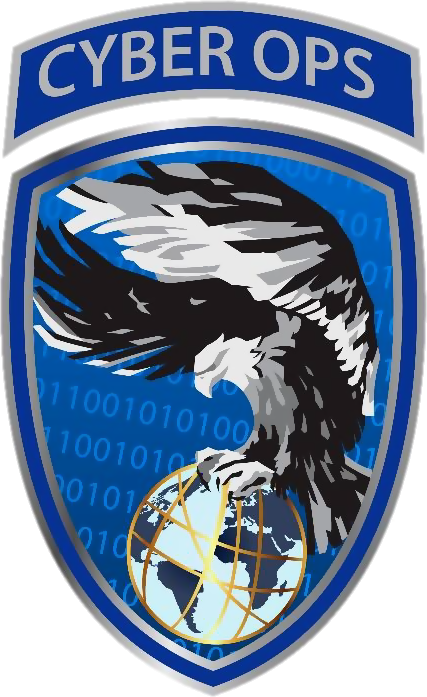
- Shoulder sleeve insignia (everyday uniform) of the CDF Command

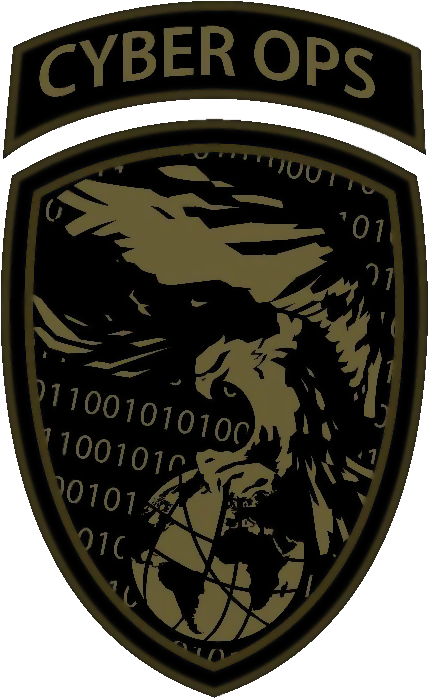
- Shoulder sleeve insignia (field uniform) of the CDF Command

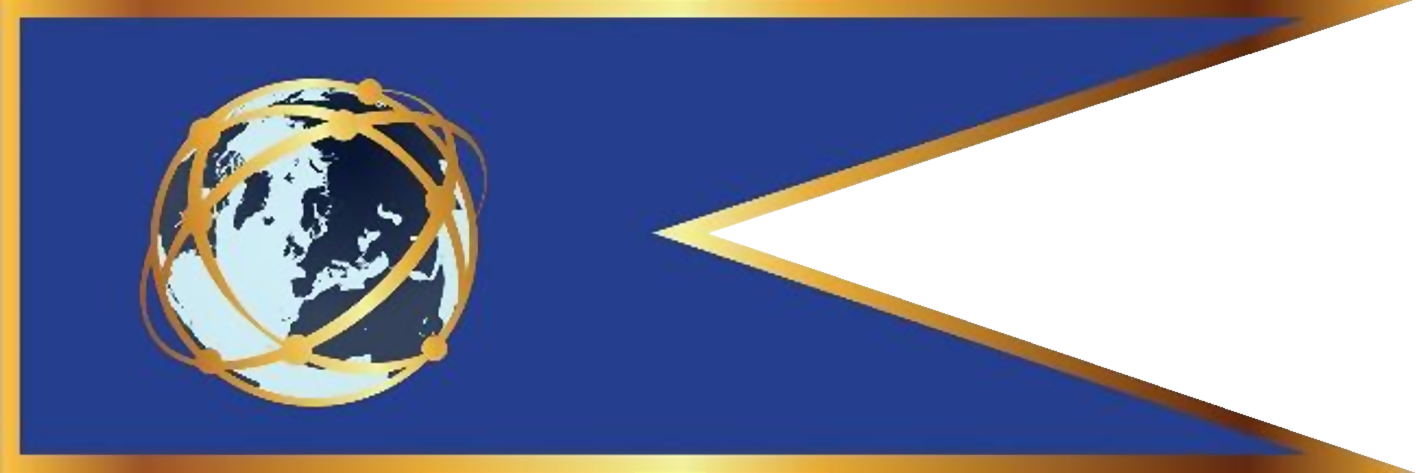
- Beret flash of the CDF Command

The Cyberspace Defense Forces (Polish: Wojska Obrony Cyberprzestrzeni) are a specialized component of the Polish Armed Forces established on February 8, 2022, by the Minister of National Defense, Mariusz Błaszczak in Warsaw. Creation Day, February 8, is symbolic as it is Safer Internet Day.

The unit is to deal with cyber-security of the Republic of Poland in the military dimension. The unit cooperates with the National Cyberspace Security Center. The Act of March 11, 2022 on the defense of the Fatherland mentions in art. 15 sec. 4 point 2 of the Cyberspace Defense Forces, defining them as a specialized component of the Armed Forces.

At the launch ceremony at the Military University of Technology, the Ministry of National Defence, Mariusz Błaszczak, said, "In 2016 NATO announced cyberspace as another domain in which Article 5 [the collective defence clause of the North Atlantic Treaty] could be activated. The WOC is part of the regular army, with reconnaissance, defence, and offensive capabilities."

== See also ==
- Cyber and Information Domain Service (Germany)
- Norwegian Cyber Defence Force
- Estonian Defence League's Cyber Unit
