= Central Office for Information Technology in the Security Sector =

German federal agency

- Zentrale Stelle für Informationstechnik im Sicherheitsbereich (ZITiS)

Agency overview
- Formed: 6 April 2017
- Headquarters: Zamdorfer Straße 88, Munich, Bavaria
- Employees: 250 (April 2022); 400 (planned 2022)
- Annual budget: €36,721,000 (2019)
- Agency executive: Wilfried Karl, President
- Parent department: Federal Ministry of the Interior
- Website: zitis.bund.de

The Central Office for Information Technology in the Security Sector (German: Zentrale Stelle für Informationstechnik im Sicherheitsbereich, ZITiS) is a federal agency of the German government. Headquartered in Munich, it is subordinate to the Federal Ministry of the Interior, Building and Community. Its mission is to develop and research technical solutions, tools and methods for other government agencies.

As such ZITiS is not an intelligence or law enforcement agency of its own, but rather provides services for the Federal Police (BPOL), Federal Criminal Police Office (BKA) and Federal Office for the Protection of the Constitution (BfV). The agency also cooperates with universities and research institutes to develop new surveillance technology and strategies. ZITiS operations are organised in four departments: Telecommunication Surveillance, Digital Forensics, Cryptanalysis, and Big Data Analysis.

== History ==
The agency was founded on 6 April 2017, and by 2022 is planned to employ 400 people. The decryption of encrypted messenger services such as WhatsApp was cited as one of its primary goals. The agency's president Winfried Karl in 2017 publicly called for the authority to strike back against the perpetrators of cyberattacks.

In June 2018 the team consisted of 60 members, growing to 100 by April 2019, although the budget intended 150 employees in 2018. Some employees were recruited from other government agencies, others previously worked in the private industry.

The announcement of ZITiS' creation led to significant criticism from opposition parties and internet privacy activists. Alliance 90/The Greens threatened a constitutional complaint against the agency. Thomas de Maizière stated in response that ZITiS activities would be compliant with the law.

== See also ==
- Federal Office for Information Security
- National Cyberdefence Centre
