= National Cyber Security Centre =

National Cyber Security Centre, National Cyber Security Center, or National Cybersecurity Center may refer to:

== Americas ==
- Cybersecurity and Infrastructure Security Agency, United States
- Canadian Centre for Cyber Security, Canada

== Asia ==
- Bangladesh e-Government Computer Incident Response Team
- Cyber Security Agency (Singapore)
- Indian Computer Emergency Response Team, India
- National Electronic Security Authority, UAE
- National Center for Cyber Security (Pakistan)

== Europe ==
- Agence nationale de la sécurité des systèmes d'information, France
- Estonian Defence League's Cyber Unit
- European Cybercrime Centre (EC3), European Union
- National Cyberdefence Centre, Germany
- National Cyber Security Centre (Ireland)
- National Cyber Security Centre of Lithuania
- National Cyber Security Centre (Netherlands)
- National Cyber Security Centre (United Kingdom)

== Oceania ==
- Australian Cyber Security Centre
- National Cyber Security Centre (New Zealand)

== See also ==
- Cooperative Cyber Defence Centre of Excellence, Tallinn, Estonia
- National Intelligence Service (South Korea), oversees cyber security in South Korea
