= Polyas =

German software company

Coordinates: 51.304804423124274°N 9.444670318034563°E

POLYAS GmbH
- Type: Private
- Industry: Electronic voting, Software
- Founded: 1996 (software); 2012 (company)
- Founders: Wolfgang Jung; Kai Reinhard
- Headquarters: Kassel, Germany
- Area served: Europe
- Products: Online voting software
- Website: www.polyas.com

POLYAS is a German software company specializing in electronic and online voting systems. The company is headquartered in Kassel, Germany, and develops software used for elections by universities, associations, cooperatives, and political parties.

== History ==
The POLYAS software was originally developed in 1996 by Wolfgang Jung and Kai Reinhard. The first election using the system took place in Finland in 1996 during a youth election, involving approximately 30,000 participants voting in three languages.

Until 2012, POLYAS operated as a project within the German IT company Micromata GmbH. In 2012, it was spun off as an independent entity, POLYAS GmbH. Following its incorporation, the software saw increased adoption in German university elections.

In 2016, the POLYAS voting system received certification from the Federal Office for Information Security (BSI) under Common Criteria standards for use in non-political elections.

During the COVID-19 pandemic, the use of the software expanded to political parties for internal decision-making processes. In 2025, the Social Democratic Party of Germany (SPD) utilized POLYAS for a membership vote regarding a federal coalition agreement.

Since 2023, POLYAS representatives have publicly advocated for the legalization of digital works council elections and the digitalization of Bundestag elections.

== Functionality ==
The POLYAS platform allows election organizers to upload a register of eligible voters and distribute access credentials by post or email. The system can integrate with external authentication methods such as LDAP and Single Sign-On (SSO).

To ensure ballot secrecy, POLYAS uses a two-server architecture: one server verifies voter eligibility, while a separate server stores votes without any link to voter identities. Since Version Core 3, the software has offered an optional end-to-end verification feature that enables voters to confirm that their vote was correctly recorded.

== Reception and criticism ==
=== Proprietary software ===
POLYAS has been criticized by academic and student organizations for relying on proprietary software. Critics argue that the absence of publicly available source code limits transparency and independent auditing. Concerns have also been raised about elections being hosted on company-managed servers rather than on infrastructure controlled by organizers.

=== Legal challenges ===
Several elections conducted with POLYAS have faced legal challenges in Germany. In 2014, online student council elections at Friedrich Schiller University Jena were declared invalid by the Thuringian Higher Administrative Court for violating existing election regulations. In 2016, a works council election using POLYAS was annulled by the Hamburg Labour Court because German law required in-person voting at the time.
