= Service central de la sécurité des systèmes d'informations =

The Service central de la sécurité des systèmes d'informations (SCSSI) (English: Central Service for Information System Security) was responsible for regulation of the use of cryptosystems by the government of France. Users for authentication must make a declaration to the SCSSI that is then verified, and users for privacy purposes are required to have an authorization from SCSSI.

== History ==
SCSSI superseded the Interministerial Office for Information Systems Security Service (DCSSI) in February 1996, and French law on ciphering changed in July 1996. It is somewhat similar to the British Communications-Electronics Security Group (CESG), which is part of GCHQ (the equivalent French organisation is DGSE).

SCSSI was one of the founding organisations of the Common Criteria, together with GCHQ, BSI, and NLNCSA

SCSSI became DCSSI in 2001 (cf. décret no 2001-693 du 31 juillet 2001) which became ANSSI in 2009 (cf. décret n° 2009-834 du 7 juillet 2009).
