= CLIP OS =

French Linux-based operating system

- Developer: Agence nationale de la sécurité des systèmes d'information
- Stable release: 5.0
- Written in: C
- Operating system: Linux
- Type: Security,
- License: GNU LGPL v2.1+
- Website: clip-os.org

CLIP OS is a Linux-based operating system created by ANSSI, the National Cybersecurity Agency of France. The aim is to produce a hardened operating system to secure sensitive information which meets the needs of the French Administration.

== History ==
CLIP OS has been in development since before 2008. In September 2018, ANSSI released two version of CLIP OS to the public: a stable version 4, and an in-development version 5.

== System overview ==
CLIP OS is based on the Hardened Gentoo variant of Gentoo Linux. The developers have noted that whilst it has similar aims to Qubes OS, the environment isolation mechanism is different. Further, administrators on a CLIP OS system will not be able to access user data, unlike a Qubes-based system.

== See also ==
- Security-Enhanced Linux
- Gentoo Linux
- Qubes OS
