= Federal Office for the Protection of the Constitution =

German domestic intelligence agency

- Bundesamt für Verfassungsschutz (BfV)
- Emblem of the Federal Office for the Protection of the Constitution

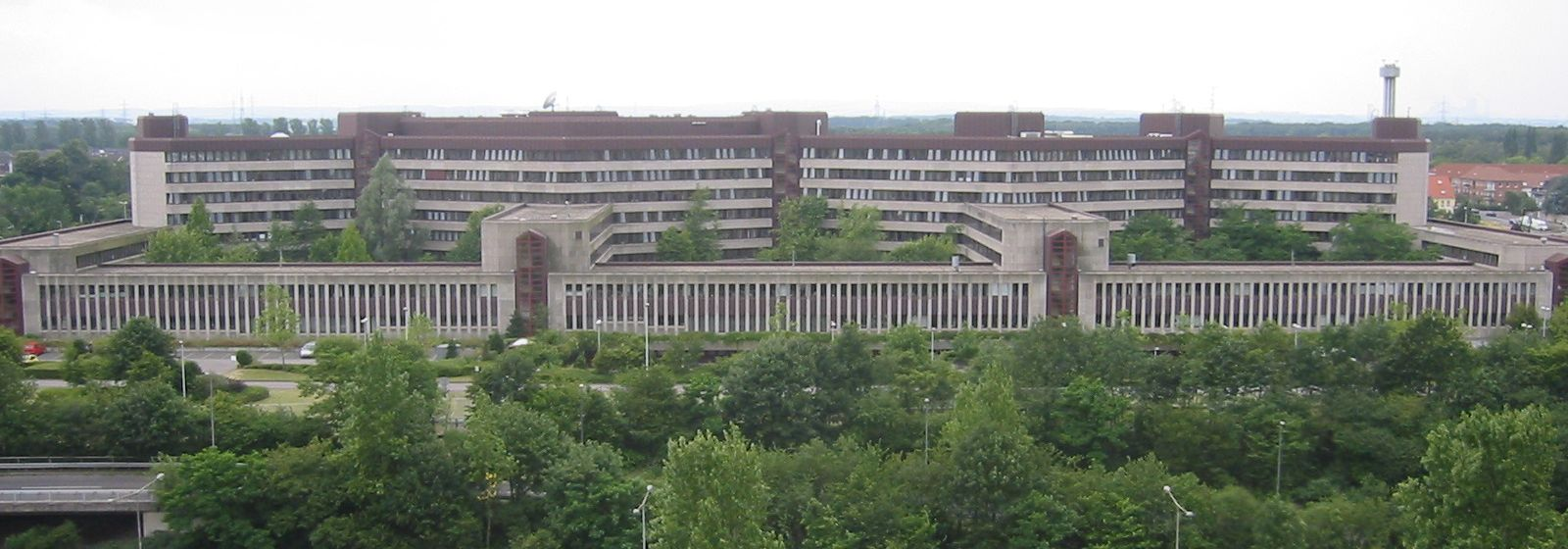
- BfV headquarters in Cologne

Agency overview
- Formed: 7 November 1950; 76 years ago
- Jurisdiction: Government of Germany
- Headquarters: Cologne; 51°01′10″N 6°53′29″E
- Employees: 4,414 (2022)
- Annual budget: €469 million (2022)
- Minister responsible: Alexander Dobrindt (CSU), Federal Minister of the Interior and Community
- Agency executives: Sinan Selen, President; Silke Willems, Vice President
- Parent agency: Federal Ministry of the Interior
- Website: www.verfassungsschutz.de

The Federal Office for the Protection of the Constitution (German: Bundesamt für Verfassungsschutz or BfV, often Bundesverfassungsschutz) is Germany's federal domestic intelligence agency. Together with the Landesämter für Verfassungsschutz (LfV) at the state level, the federal agency is tasked with intelligence-gathering on efforts against the liberal democratic basic order, the existence and security of the federation or one of its states, and the peaceful coexistence of peoples; with counter-intelligence; and with protective security and counter-sabotage. The BfV reports to the Federal Ministry of the Interior and tasks and powers are regulated in the Federal Constitutional Protection Act (Bundesverfassungsschutzgesetz [BVerfSchG]).

== Overview ==
Together with the Federal Intelligence Service and the Military Counterintelligence Service, the BfV is one of the three federal intelligence services. The BfV investigates efforts and activities directed against the federal level of Germany or transnational, in matters of foreign policy significance and at the request of a state authority for the protection of the constitution. The federal government has the right to issue instructions to the states in matters relating to the protection of the constitution if an attack on the "constitutional order of the federation occurs".

The BfV is overseen by the Federal Ministry of the Interior as well as the Bundestag, the Federal Commissioner for Data Protection and Freedom of Information and other federal institutions. The Federal Minister of the Interior has administrative and functional control of the BfV. Parliamentary control is exercised by the Bundestag in general debate, question times and urgent inquiries, as well as by its committees, most notably the Parliamentary Oversight Panel and the G-10 Commission. The BfV is also under judicial control and all its activities can be legally challenged in court. Based on the right of information, the general public can direct inquiries and petitions at the BfV. The BfV does not have any police powers or authority to issue instructions. It may also not request the police, by way of administrative assistance (Amtshilfe), to take measures for which it itself is not authorized.

== Organization ==
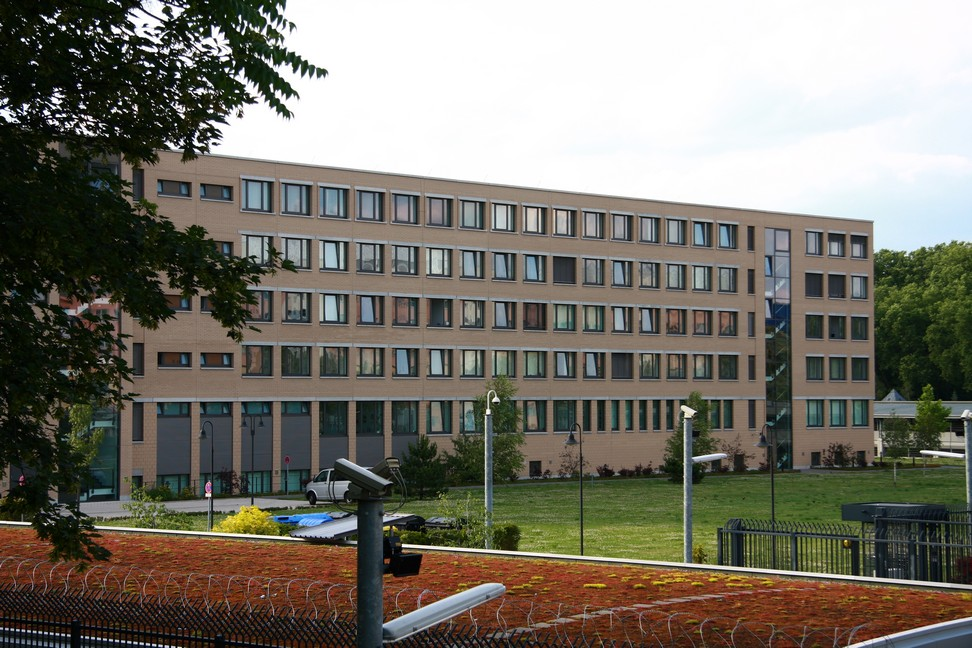
BfV building in Berlin

The BfV is based in Cologne. It is headed by a president and two vice-presidents and is organised in twelve departments:

- Department Z: Central Services
- Department TA: Technical Analysis
- Department TX: Technical Infrastructure
- Department C: Cyber Defence
- Department O: Surveillance
- Department S: Internal Security, Protective Security and Counter-sabotage, Supervisory and Advisory Quality Management, Internal Audit
- Department 1: Specialized Support
- Department 2: Right-wing extremism/Terrorism
- Department 3: Measures according to the G-10 act
- Department 4: Counter-espionage, and Protection Against Industrial Espionage
- Department 5: Extremism of foreigners and Left-wing extremism
- Department 6: Islamic extremism and terrorism
- AfV: Academy of the German Domestic Intelligence Services (including the MAD)
- ZNAF (Zentrum für Nachrichtendienstliche Aus- und Fortbildung): Education and Training (in cooperation with the BND)

The president is Sinan Selen. In 2022, federal funding for the BfV was €469 million; with a total of 4,414 staff members employed.

== Task ==
General mandate: A prerequisite for warding off dangers posed by enemies of the free democratic basic order is comprehensive information of state bodies and the public about anti-constitutional efforts and developments, with the aim of defending the values of the basic order. The BfV is responsible for providing an early warning system ("Frühwarnsystem"). The specific tasks of the BfV arise from § 3 of the BVerfSchG (Tasks of the Office for the Protection of the Constitution) in conjunction with § 5 of the BVerfSchG (Distinction between the federal government and the states):

=== Defensive democracy ===
One of the BfV's main tasks is to collect and evaluate information, such as factual or personal information, news or documents about efforts directed against the free democratic basic order. It is therefore part of the concept of a defensive democracy, according to which an early warning system is set up in order to "identify threats in advance of a specific danger in order to be able to react to them politically and/or legally in a timely manner."

These include political or violent activities that endanger the security or existence of the Federal Republic of Germany due to their anti-democratic attitudes or intentions, such as extreme left or extreme right parties and organizations or terrorist groups. The Federal Police's Center for Information and Communication Technology (Zentrum für Informations- und Kommunikationstechnik (IKTZ)) supports the BfV in the field of radio technology in accordance with § 10 of the Federal Police Act (Bundespolizeigesetz (BPolG)). In 2008, the heads of the constitutional protection authorities specifically called for the strategic monitoring of relevant Internet exchange point such as the DE-CIX.

=== Counterintelligence ===
The BfV's legal mandate is to investigate "security-endangering or intelligence-related activities ... for a foreign power" (§ 3 of the BVerfSchG), i.e. to counter espionage and sabotage within the country. To this end, the BfV investigates the activities of foreign intelligence services in order to prevent espionage activities and sabotage measures against political and public institutions (e.g. political parties or government agencies) or commercial enterprises. This also includes uncovering illegal business or the leakage of know-how that could serve to further proliferate nuclear, biological or chemical weapons. Corresponding activities that take place abroad are monitored by the Federal Intelligence Service.

Countering espionage in the area of the Bundeswehr or the area of responsibility of the Federal Ministry of Defense (§ 1 of the Law on the Military Counterintelligence Service (Gesetz über den militärischen Abschirmdienst (MADG)) is the task of the Military Counterintelligence Service (MAD). In the area of counter-espionage, the BfV distinguishes between A, B and C states. The A states are dealt with particularly intensively. In 2022, these included Russia, China, Turkey, Iran and North Korea. In the case of the B states, 21 in 2022, there is no permanent observation, but rather the processing of individual suspected cases. In the case of the C states, 172 in 2022, no intelligence means are used in principle. Suspected case processing is possible in every category. Even today, the BfV's counter-espionage department deals with those former members of the Ministry for State Security (Stasi) of the German Democratic Republic who continue to work in intelligence services, mostly on behalf of Russia. Since 2015, Department 4, responsible for counter-espionage, has been growing, and later responsibility for cyber defense was also placed in this department. A few weeks after the start of the Ukraine war in 2022, the office applied for an additional 50 positions for Department 4.

=== Secret and economic protection ===
Another area of responsibility of the BfV is the protection of secrets and economic security. In relation to the work of the BfV, this includes regulations and instructions or recommendations that are intended to ensure the protection of classified information belonging to the state and the industry commissioned by it (protection of secrets) or of trade secret (economic security) from unauthorized access. The BfV offers publications on the Internet and advice to commercial enterprises. In addition, the BfV carries out security checks for personnel (Sicherheitsüberprüfung) in areas of commercial enterprises that are subject to secrecy. Since 2008, the information transfer between the BfV and the economy has been carried out by the Working Group for Economic Security (Allianz für Sicherheit in der Wirtschaft) in the Economic Security Department (Ressortkreis Wirtschaftsschutz).

== Objects of observation ==
In the 2018 report on the protection of the constitution, the BfV divides the politically motivated crime objects for reconnaissance and observation into the following fields:

- right-wing extremism
- left-wing extremism
- Islamism and Islamic terrorism
- security-threatening and extremist activities of foreigners (excluding Islamism).

Politically motivated crime (Politisch motivierte Kriminalität (PMK)) refers to and records crimes that constitute state security crimes (Staatsschutzdelikte). These include §§ 80 to 83, 84 to 91, 94 to 100a, 102 to 104a, 105 to 108e, 109 to 109h, 129a, 130, 234a and 241a of the Criminal Code (StGB).

=== Examples of politically motivated crime ===
Examples of groups of people whose individual members have been or are being interviewed or observed by the BfV and affiliated organizations are:

- People from associations associated with the right-wing extremist spectrum: Alternative für Deutschland, Der Flügel, Junge Alternative, Generation Germany, NPD (NPD banning attempt), Junge Nationalisten, Ring Nationaler Frauen, DS-Verlag, Die Rechte, Der III. Weg, National Socialist Underground, German People's Union, Freie Kameradschaften or those close to them
- People from parties and organizations of the left-wing extremist spectrum, including parts of the party The Left; also the Communist Party of Germany (KPD), German Communist Party, Marxist–Leninist Party of Germany, historically Red Army Faction and Free German Youth, Communist Party of Turkey/Marxist–Leninist, Freie Arbeiterinnen- und Arbeiter-Union, Anarcho-Syndicalist Union of Germany and others, as well as autonomous groups
- Islamic fundamentalist and Islamist organizations ICCB (Chaplains' Association), Millî Görüş, IS, al-Qaida (and derivatives), Hamas, Jihadism, Turkish Hezbollah, Muslim Brotherhood and others
- Persons from the Kurdistan Workers' Party, the Revolutionary People's Liberation Front, Turkish right-wing extremism such as the Ülkücü movement and other extremist groups
- Cyber attack groups
- Intelligence and security services of the Russian Federation, the People's Republic of China, the Islamic Republic of Iran, Turkey and other states active in Germany
- Scientology
- Historically refugees from the Eastern Bloc, as Eastern secret services placed agents among the people who emigrated from the GDR by applying for an exit permit infiltrated, among other things, for the purpose of spying on Western secret holders (Günter Guillaume).
- Historically politicians of the former GDR and other socialist states (wiretapping operations, analyses).

== Activity and methodology ==
The primary purpose of intelligence gathering is to inform the federal and state governments as well as the public, who must then draw political conclusions from the findings. The prerequisite for surveillance by the BfV is the existence of actual evidence. This determination can be checked by the person being observed in court. In order to establish the basis for surveillance in a way that is legally binding, the BfV must have the opportunity to carry out an investigation. This can only be done by evaluating publicly accessible sources, which is not yet relevant to fundamental rights in the case of public communication content. At this stage, the BfV refers to a test case (Prüffall).

If the investigation reveals suspicion of anti-constitutional activities, the BfV initiates a suspected case (Verdachtsfall). The BfV is now allowed to collect personal data and carry out investigations using individual intelligence means. This includes in particular the use of observers who specifically attend events. Undercover employees or communication surveillance are not permitted in this case unless other requirements are met. The BfV, together with the state authorities for the protection of the constitution, uses a computer system called NADIS to store personal data. While the BfV uses all kinds of surveillance technology and infiltration, they mostly use open sources. The BfV publishes a yearly report (Verfassungsschutzbericht) which is intended to raise awareness about anti-constitutional activities.

=== Open-source intelligence ===
The BfV obtains most of its information from open-sources such as newspapers, television, the Internet, leaflets and the like. In addition, employees attend public information events run by monitored organizations.

=== Intelligence resources ===
According to § 8 of the BVerfSchG, the BfV is permitted to use intelligence means (Nachrichtendienstliche Mittel (nd-Mittel)). For example, the BfV obtains information from informants (Vertrauenspersonen) who move in extremist or terrorist circles. Recruiting informants in right-wing extremism is considered easier because they often have financial problems, want to be considered important and tend to have a positive attitude towards the state. Left-wing extremists, on the other hand, are more ideologically stable and reject state institutions.

The BfV is permitted to conduct observations, make secret image and sound recordings and use cover plates (Tarnkennzeichen) and cover papers (Tarnpapiere). The BfV is also authorized to monitor mail and telecommunications (Brief- und Telekommunikationsüberwachung, recording telephone conversations, internet and other data transmissions, mobile phone cell queries). When carrying out these actions, however, it is bound by the Act on Restrictions on the Secrecy of Mail, Post and Telecommunications (G-10 Act; Gesetz zur Beschränkung des Brief‑, Post- und Fernmeldegeheimnisses). The monitoring of bundled telecommunications (gebündelte Telekommunikation; e.g. via satellite or in internet exchange point) is reserved for the Federal Intelligence Service according to § 5 G-10 Act. The BfV uses virtual agents who use various profiles in social networks to try to obtain information and infiltrate groups. In counter-espionage, all intelligence means are used, including the use of double agents, who are called countermen in the BfV, as well as undercover employees according to § 9a BVerfSchG, who are also called undercover agents (UCA) within the BfV.

==== Online-Durchsuchung ====
Online-Durchsuchung means that authorities access the hard drive of a person's computer using software installed while using the Internet, a so-called Trojan horse (also known as a Federal trojan horse (Bundestrojaner) in Germany). The data stored on the hard drive is transmitted to the authorities secretly and over a longer period of time. The BfV does not provide the public with any information on the practice of Online-Durchsuchungen. Whether Online-Durchsuchungen by authorities are generally permissible is controversial.

==== Cooperation with other intelligence services ====
The BfV works with domestic and foreign intelligence services. In at least one case, the BfV has turned to US authorities for help in unmasking a US spy. The spy was from the NSA, who was spying on the German Parliamentary Committee investigation of the NSA spying scandal (1. Untersuchungsausschuss "NSA").

== Personnel, recruitment and training ==
The BfV employed civil servants (Beamte). As in the rest of the federal service, the careers for civil servants are divided into simple, middle, upper and higher service. All employees must go through an extended security check with security investigations before they can work in the BfV. It's the highest security check in Germany. The BfV trains its staff for the middle and higher service itself, together with the BND.

=== Middle-Service ===
For the Middle-Service (German: Mittlerer Dienst) the training conveys the theoretical knowledge and methods as well as the practical professional knowledge and skills that are required for the fulfillment of the tasks in the middle service in the Federal Office for the Protection of the Constitution. In addition, the training should enable the candidates to act responsibly in a liberal, democratic and social constitutional state. This also includes the ability to recognize and classify potential dangers for the security of the Federal Republic of Germany in a national and international context.

The subject areas of the theoretical training are operational procurement and observation, operational information analysis, state and constitutional law, criminal law, laws on the intelligence services and other laws relating to intelligence services, international politics and forms of political extremism, security fields relating to intelligence services, in particular self-security, counter-espionage, intelligence-psychology, foreign language training as well as household, cash and accounting. The training takes place at both the ZNAF and the AfV.

=== Upper-Service ===
In a close connection between science and practice, the upper-service conveys the scientific methods and knowledge as well as the practical professional skills and knowledge that are required for the fulfillment of the tasks in the higher service in the federal constitution protection. In addition, it lays the foundation for a cross-agency knowledge and method base. The course is intended to promote cooperation between the intelligence services and contribute to the standardization of intelligence work.

In the basic course, legal, constitutional, political, business, economic, financial and social science fundamentals of administrative action are taught, as well as organization and information processing. Topics of the main course are operational procurement and observation, intelligence service information evaluation, state, administrative, criminal, international and European law, international politics and the history of political ideas as well as forms of political extremism, internal security, counter-espionage, intelligence-psychology, foreign language training and intelligence service relevant topics from business and technology. A thesis has to be written during the preparatory service. The training takes place at both the ZNAF and the AfV.

=== Higher-Service ===
Above all, the BfV offers fully qualified lawyers entry into the higher non-technical administrative service as a junior executive with direct employment as a civil servant.

== History ==
An indirect predecessor of the federal office existed already in the Weimar Republic from 1920 to 1929, the Federal Commissioner for Monitoring of the Public Order. In the course of drafting the Basic Law for the Federal Republic of Germany, the military governors of the Trizone outlined the competences of federal police and intelligence (German: Polizeibrief of 14 April 1949). In accordance with this outline the BfV was established on 7 November 1950. At first the BfV was mostly concerned with Neo-Nazism and communist revolutionary activities. Soon the BfV also became involved in counter-espionage.

From the beginning, the BfV was troubled by a number of affairs. First, in the Vulkan affair in April 1953, 44 suspects were arrested and charged with spying on behalf of East Germany (GDR), but were later released as the information provided by the BfV was insufficient to obtain court verdicts. Then, in 1954 the first president of the BfV, Otto John, fled to the GDR. Shortly after that it became public that a number of employees of the BfV had been with the Gestapo during the Third Reich. Nevertheless, material on the Communist Party of Germany (KPD) was essential for banning the party by the Federal Constitutional Court of Germany in August 1956. Over the years, a number of associations and political groups were banned on the basis of materials provided by the BfV.

In 1965, the Brown Book exposed that a large number of BfV officers had previously held prominent positions in Nazi Germany. Initially dismissed as "Communist propaganda", subsequent historical research confirmed its accuracy to be up to 99%. For instance, their head from 1955 to 1972, Hubert Schrübbers, had been a member of the SA, a Nazi judicial prosecutor involved in cases against racially and politically persecuted individuals who were later murdered in Auschwitz, and an SS executioner in occupied France.

In 1978, the service was responsible for a False flag attack on the Justizvollzugsanstalt Celle. GSG 9 operatives detonated an explosive device on a wall of the prison, faking a rescue attempt for imprisoned RAF terrorist Sigurd Debus. A public warrant for the arrest of a Klaus-Dieter Loudil was issued shortly afterwards, Loudil had been recruited as undercover agent and the Verfassungsschutz hoped that the rescue attempt for Debus would give him enough credibility to be accepted into the RAF.

Since 1972, the BfV is concerned with activities of foreign nationals in Germany, especially extremists and terrorists who operate in the country or plan their activities there, such as the Kurdistan Workers' Party. One of the major intelligence failures in this field were the riots by supporters of the PKK in 1998, which the BfV missed due to the Cologne carnival. The counter-intelligence activities of the BfV were mostly directed against the East German Ministry for State Security (Stasi), another employer of ex-Gestapo agents. The MfS successfully penetrated the BfV and in a number of affairs destroyed its reputation as a counter-intelligence service by the early 1980s. In this, the MfS profited from the West German border regime which allowed any GDR citizen into the Federal Republic without restrictions. On 19 January 1979, MfS officer de:Werner Stiller fled from East to West Germany. Before, he had delivered many secret documents. On 26 June 1981, the MfS executed Werner Teske.

From 1992 to 2006, the BfV was monitoring The Republicans party. In 2018 Franziska Schreiber, former leader of Junge Alternative, the youth wing of Alternative for Germany (AfD), asserted that BfV President Hans-Georg Maaßen had given AfD leadership advice on how to avoid BfV scrutiny. Maaßen later downplayed reports of anti-migrant "hunts" in Chemnitz. In June 2024, the BfV classified the BDS movement as a suspected case of extremism. The decision followed an assessment of intensified anti-Israel activities by BDS-affiliated groups during the conflict in Gaza. As of May 2025, the BfV designates the AfD as a right-wing extremist organisation. AfD leaders Alice Weidel and Tino Chrupalla said the decision was "clearly politically motivated" and was a "severe blow to German democracy". They claimed that the AfD was being discredited and persecuted by the government. On 5 May, the AfD sued the Federal Office for the Protection of Constitution, accusing it of violating the German constitution by trying to prosecute AfD for expressing ideas which are considered freedom of speech and legitimate criticism of German immigration policies.

== Criticism ==
The BfV has responsibility for combatting terrorism in Germany. It has drawn harsh criticism for its role in several bungled counterterrorism operations. Shortly after German reunification, an undercover BfV agent named Klaus Steinmetz successfully infiltrated the Red Army Faction (RAF), the far left terrorist organization founded by Andreas Baader, Ulrike Meinhof, and Gudrun Ensslin. As a result, Third Generation RAF leaders Birgit Hogefeld and Wolfgang Grams were to be taken into custody by German law enforcement at the railway station at Bad Kleinen, Mecklenburg-Vorpommern on 27 June 1993. Instead, both Wolfgang Grams and GSG 9 police officer Michael Newrzella died during an ensuing gunfight. Due to a number of easily preventable mistakes involving the BfV and the various police services involved in the operation, Germany's Federal Minister of the Interior, Rudolf Seiters, took full responsibility and resigned from his post.

The even more preventable failure of the BfV to even detect the activities of the 9/11 conspirators in Hamburg has similarly raised questions about their competence. The rise of far right extremism in the former GDR has also been partly blamed on the BfV's failure to establish working structures there. The agency was heavily criticised for the destruction of files related to the National Socialist Underground, a neo-Nazi domestic terrorist organization. The ensuing scandal led to the resignation of BfV president Heinz Fromm in 2012. Hans-Georg Maaßen, who led the agency from 2012 to 2018, has since criticised the agency as "out of control" in how it observes political parties. Maaßen was forced out of his role as BfV president in 2018, in part for passing information to AfD leadership from unpublished reports on extremism.

== In popular media ==
The Federal Office for the Protection of the Constitution, headed by Otto John, featured in the 2023 political thriller series Bonn – Alte Freunde, neue Feinde.

== Presidents ==
- Otto John (1 December 1950 – 20 July 1954)
- Hanns Jess (Acting) (26 July 1954 – 31 July 1955)
- Hubert Schrübbers (1 August 1955 – 30 April 1972)
- Günther Nollau (1 May 1972 – 31 August 1975)
- Richard Meier (1 September 1975 – 26 April 1982)
- Heribert Hellenbroich (13 May 1983 – 31 July 1985)
- Ludwig-Holger Pfahls (1 August 1985 – 1 April 1987)
- Gerhard Boeden (9 April 1987 – 28 February 1991)
- Eckart Werthebach (28 February 1991 – 27 July 1995)
- Hansjörg Geiger (1 August 1995 – 15 May 1996)
- Peter Frisch (15 May 1996 – 10 April 2000)
- Heinz Fromm (1 June 2000 – 31 July 2012)
- Hans-Georg Maaßen (1 August 2012 – 8 November 2018)
- Thomas Haldenwang (November 2018 – 13 November 2024)
- Sinan Selen (October 2025 – present)

== See also ==
- Braunbuch
- List of intelligence agencies of Germany
