= Sinan Selen =

German lawyer

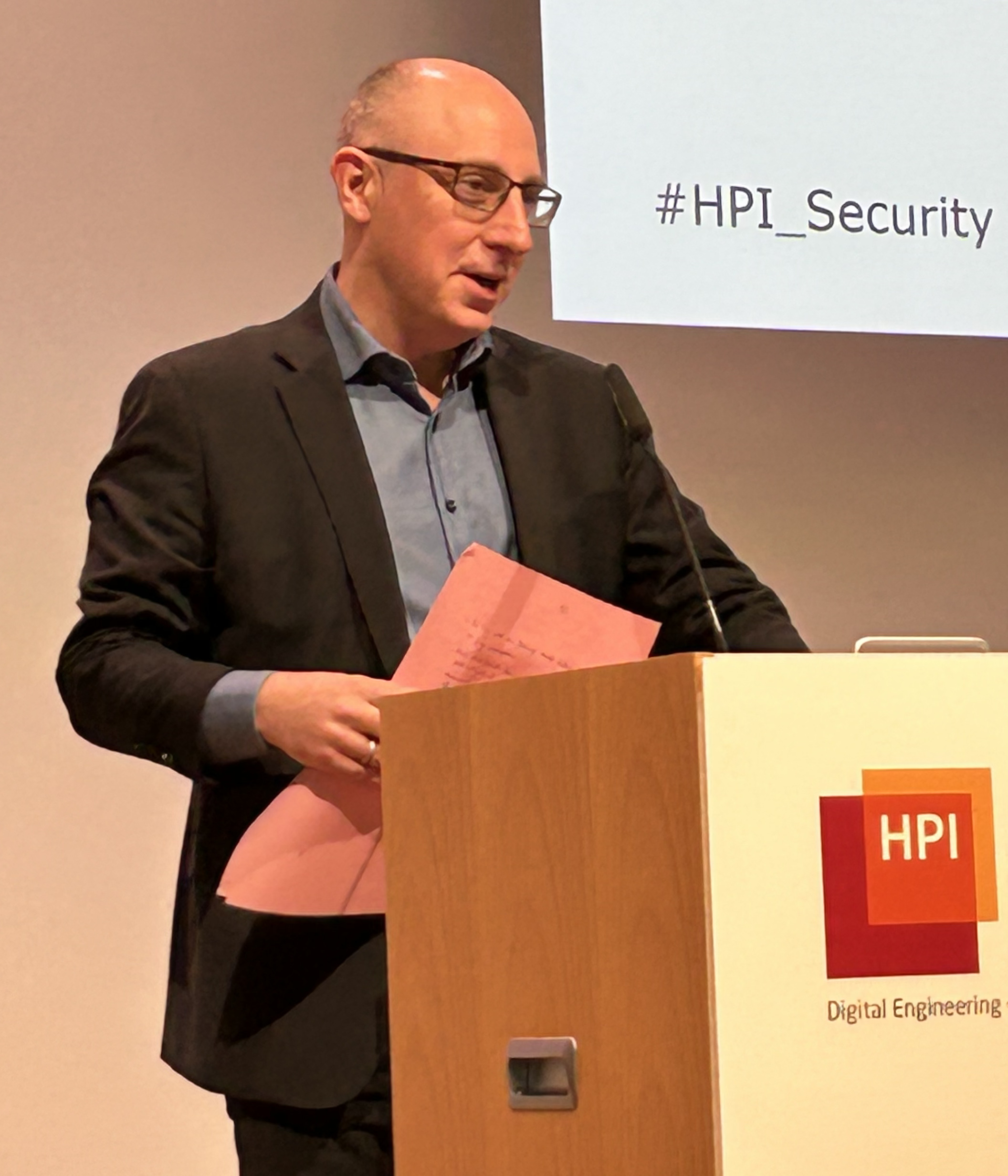
- Selen in 2023

President of the Federal Office for the Protection of the Constitution
- Incumbent
- Assumed office 13 November 2024 (Note: Acting from 13 November 2024 until 8 October 2025)
- Appointed by: Nancy Faeser (with approval of Federal Cabinet)
- Preceded by: Thomas Haldenwang

Vice President of the Federal Office for the Protection of the Constitution
- In office 21 January 2019 – 8 November 2025
- Appointed by: Horst Seehofer (with approval of Federal Cabinet)
- President: Thomas Haldenwang

Personal details
- Born: 1972 (age 53–54) Istanbul, Turkey
- Citizenship: Germany; Turkey (until 2016)
- Education: University of Cologne
- Occupation: Jurist

Sinan Selen (born 1972, Istanbul) is a German constitutional lawyer, executive officer and the President of the German Federal Office for the Protection of the Constitution (BfV). Selen is the first high-ranking officer with a migrant background in the German intelligence services.

== Early life and education ==
Selen was born in Istanbul. His partens were secular. At the age of four, he and his parents moved to Cologne, where his parents were journalists at the German broadcaster Deutsche Welle. In high school he wrote for the students' journal. He was also involved as a paramedic with the St. John ambulance service. He studied European law at the University of Cologne.

== Career ==
In 2000 Selen began his career at the Federal Criminal Police Office where he was assigned to the security detail of Chancellor Gerhard Schröder and Minister of the Interior Otto Schily. After the terrorist attacks on the twin towers in New York on 11 September 2001 he searched for traces of evidence that the attackers left in Germany. In July 2006 he organized the hunt for two Lebanese terrorists who placed two bombs on regional trains at the Cologne main station. The attack failed as the bombs did not explode. After an extensive review of videos from surveillance cameras, one of the perpetrators was captured in the train station in Kiel. Afterwards, his accomplice in Lebanon surrendered as well.

Selen entered the Ministry of the Interior in 2006, and initially his work was focused on the ban of the Salafist organization Millatu Ibrahim. He served as the head of the international counter-terrorism department until 2009. Between 2009 and 2012 he was assigned to the Headquarters of the Federal Police in the counter-piracy and human trafficking department. From 2012 onwards he worked in the Ministry of the Interior where in early 2016 he was given the task to coordinate between Turkey and Germany on terror-related issues. As a result, he and the diplomat Emily Haber often travelled to Ankara, Turkey. In their conversations with the Turkish authorities, he refused to extradite members of the Gülen movement, and conversed through a translator in the German language most of the time.

From 2016 Selen was in charge of security for the travel agency TUI. In January 2019 he assumed the role of Vice President of the Federal Office for the Protection of the Constitution (BfV), succeeding Thomas Haldenwang who was appointed president of the BfV.

== Reception ==
Selen's appointment to the vice-presidency of the BfV caused concerns across the political spectrum. The left was worried that he would cause difficulties for Kurdish sympathizers of the Kurdistan Workers Party (PKK) and left-wing Turkish political activists, while the right accused him of being a Muslim, which he actually is not. The Greens welcomed his appointment.

Selen may be less of an political activist than his predecessor, but he will not stand for a new BfV, concluded Oliver Maksan for the NZZ in 2025. It was in Selens time as acting BfV president, that a dubious report, classifying the party AFD as a right-wing extremist organisation, got published by the agency. Based on Selens statements, Maksan speculated that he would do more than Haldenwang to combat espionage and sabotage.
