= National Cyber Security Centre of Lithuania =

- Nacionalinis kibernetinio saugumo centras

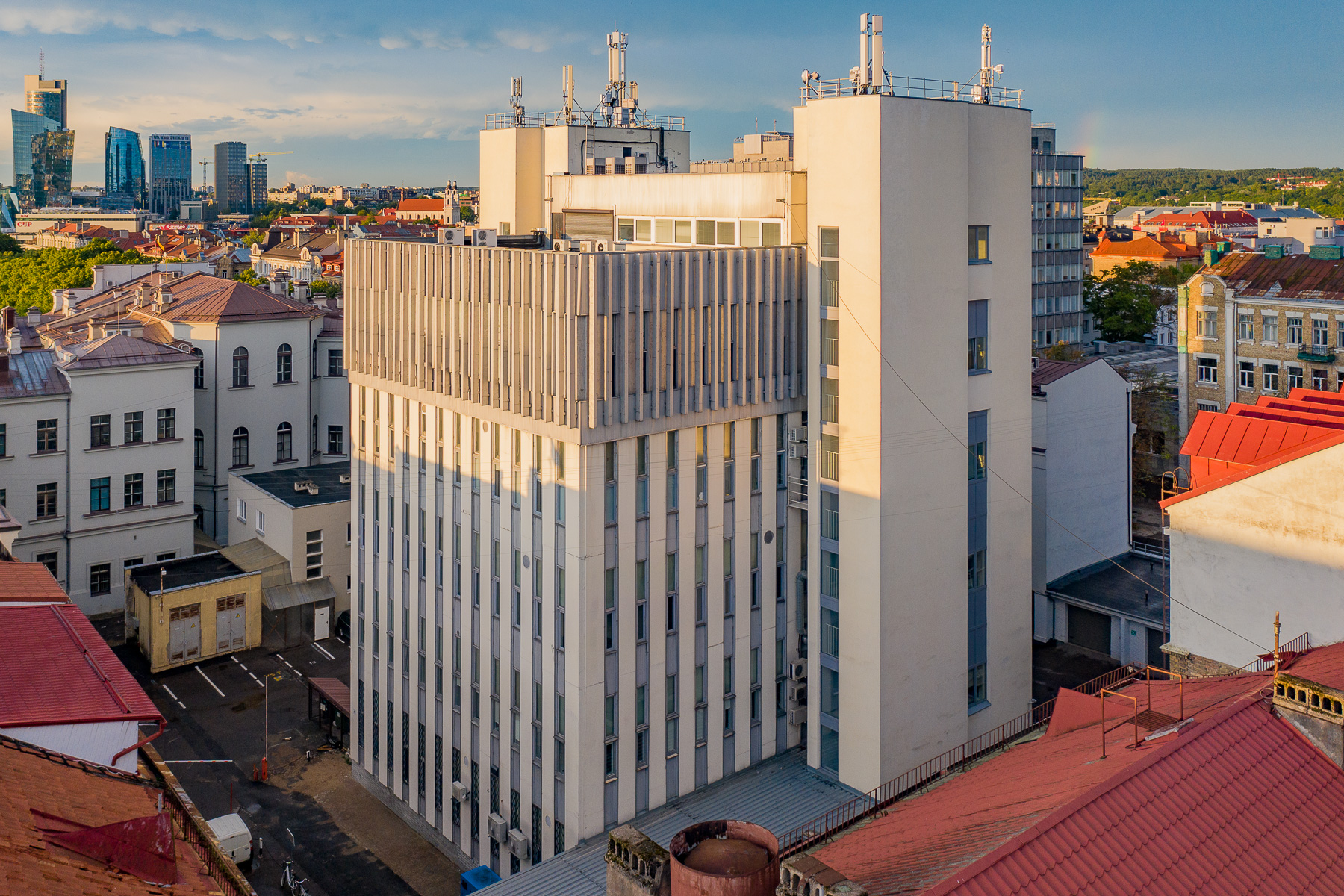
- National Cyber Security Centre of Lithuania's headquarters in Vilnius

Agency overview
- Formed: 2015
- Jurisdiction: Lithuania
- Headquarters: Gedimino pr. 40, Vilnius
- Parent agency: Ministry of National Defence (Lithuania)
- Website: National Cyber Security Centre

The National Cyber Security Centre of Lithuania is a government institution located in Vilnius, Lithuania that provides advice and support for the public and private sector in how to avoid computer security threats. It was established in 2015 and is part of the Ministry of National Defence.

== History ==
The National Cyber Security Centre of Lithuania was established in 2015 by reforming the Communications and Information Systems Service of Lithuania. It was created due to increasing cyberattack against Lithuanian institutions. Every year there are around 25,000 attacks and the number increases by 10-20% every year.

== Activities ==
It analyses the cyber security environment in Lithuania, protects national databases, manages internet operations of national organizations, prepares cyber security plans and investigates internet attacks. The centre also issues recommendations regarding the safe usage of the internet and mobile apps. In 2018, it recommend to not use the Yandex Taxi app due to its superfluous permission requirements and access to sensitive data and data storing on servers in Russia. In September 2021, the centre claimed that Xiaomi devices have built-in censorship capabilities that can be turned on remotely.

== See also ==
- National Cyber Security Centre (disambiguation) in other countries

== Links ==
- National Cyber Security Centre of Lithuania on Facebook
