= European Cybercrime Centre =

- Formation: 11 January 2013 (commenced)
- Purpose: law enforcement
- Location: The Hague, Netherlands
- Coordinates: NL 52.0928085°N 4.279317°E
- Region served: Europe
- Head: Steven Wilson
- Parent organisation: Europol
- Website: www.europol.europa.eu/about-europol/european-cybercrime-centre-ec3

The European Cybercrime Centre (EC3 or EC³) is the body of the Police Office (Europol) of the European Union (EU), headquartered in The Hague, that coordinates cross-border law enforcement activities against computer crime and acts as a centre of technical expertise on the matter.

== History ==
When officially launched on 11 January 2013, the European Cybercrime Centre was not expected to be fully operational until 2015. It began with a staff of 30, with plans to expand to 40 by the end of 2013. It began operations with a budget of about 3.6 million euros.

== Organisational structure and key personnel ==
The head of EC3 reports directly to the head of Europol. The first person to head the department was the former head of Danish domestic intelligence, Troels Oerting, who left Europol in January 2015 to become Barclays' Chief Intelligence Security Officer.

== Responsibilities and cooperation with other bodies ==
EC3 was tasked with assisting member states in their efforts to dismantle and disrupt cybercrime networks and developing tools and providing training.

EC3 works with the European Union Intelligence and Situation Centre (INTCEN), the United Nations Office on Drugs and Crime (UNDCP), the World Customs Organization (WCO), the European Border and Coast Guard Agency (EBCG, also known as Frontex), and the European Anti-fraud Office (OLAF). Press releases in 2015 also revealed that EC3 works with American security services, such as the Federal Bureau of Investigation (FBI).

There is some overlap with the responsibilities of the European Union Agency for Network and Information Security (ENISA).

At a press conference on 10 February 2014, asked about massive identity theft uncovered by the German Federal Office for Information Security, the then head of the EC3, Troels Oerting, said that his unit was not responsible for combatting "politically motivated hacking and/or espionage against EU institutions".

=== Activities ===
In February 2014, Troels Oerting reported successes that the unit had had in 2013. These included catching internet extortioners, with 13 arrests. They had also been involved in fighting malware attacks on banks using botnets and – in cooperation with Microsoft and experts from the German Federal Criminal Police Office – taking down the ZeroAccess botnet. In 2014, details were revealed of Operation Onymous, which took down a number of Darknet sites, including Pandora, Cloud 9, Hydra, Blue Sky, Topix, Flugsvamp, Cannabis Road, Black Market and Silk Road 2.0.

In 2015, American media reported on a coordinated FBI operation with the assistance of EC3 to take down Dark0de, the largest English -language communication and trading platform for cybercriminals.

Between 27 and 29 May 2024, Operation Endgame, an action led by France, Germany and the Netherlands against dropper malware including IcedID, SystemBC, Pikabot, Smokeloader, Bumblebee and Trickbot, was coordinated from Europol's headquarters. Europol described it as its largest operation against botnets to date; it led to four arrests and the takedown or disruption of more than 100 servers. Europol's announcement lists EC3 among the entities involved.

=== Participating states ===
As well as the EU member states, there is cooperation with a number of other states, including Australia, Canada, North Macedonia, Norway, Switzerland, Monaco, Bosnia and Herzegovina, Colombia, Moldova, Russia, Turkey, the Republic of Serbia, Montenegro, Ukraine and the United States.

== See also ==
- European Network and Information Security Agency
- National Cyber Security Centre (disambiguation)
