= Franziska Schreiber =

German politician and media personality

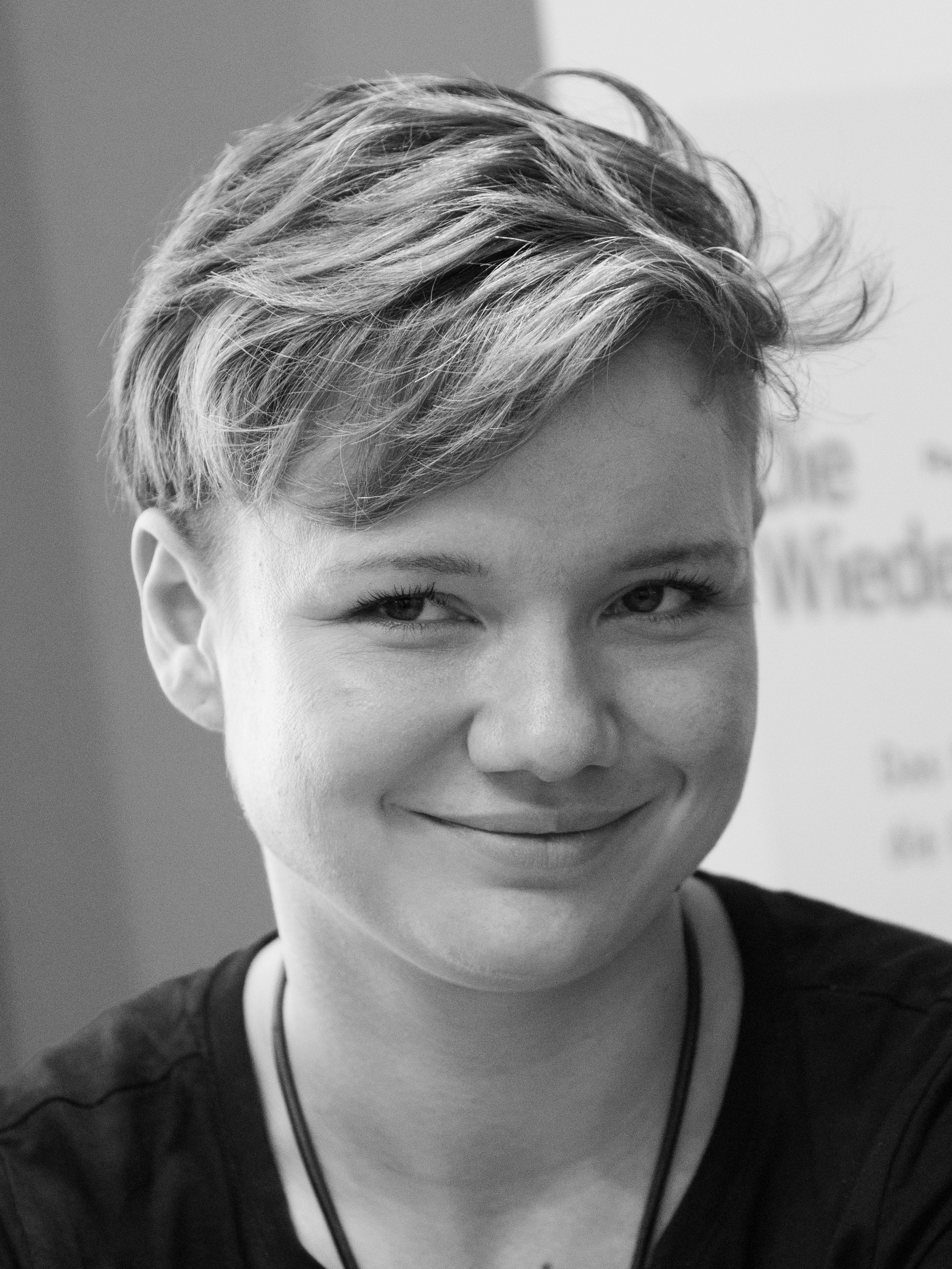
- Schreiber at the Frankfurt Book Fair in 2018
- Born: 1990 (age 35–36); Dresden, Saxony, Germany
- Education: Abitur
- Occupations: Politician; Media personality
- Political party: Alternative for Germany (2013–2017)

Franziska Schreiber (born 1990 in Dresden) is a former German politician and media-personality. She is a former member of the Junge Alternative (lit. 'Young Alternative'), the "Youth Organization" of the right-wing Alternative for Germany (AfD). Schreiber authored a critical semiautobiography about her involvement in the AfD.

== Life ==
Franziska graduated from high school in 2008. She studied law for some time after which she studied politics at an open university. She joined the AfD in 2013 and just a year later was made chairman of JA in Saxony and deputy spokesperson. Later in 2017 she became a member of the Federal Board. Shortly before the elections in 2017, she resigned from the AfD in support of the Freie Demokratische Partei (FDP). In March 2019 she started a YouTube channel, which is a part of the Funk network run by Arbeitsgemeinschaft der öffentlich-rechtlichen Rundfunkanstalten der Bundesrepublik Deutschland (ARD), and Zweites Deutsches Fernsehen (ZDF).

== History ==
She joined Alternative for Germany (AfD) in 2013. Before leaving the AfD in 2017, she was on the board of the Young Alternative for Germany. She sees herself as libertarian and publicly recommended the FDP in the 2017 federal elections and caused a sensation with her book Inside AFD: Der Bericht einer Aussteigerin, published by Europa-Verlag on 3 August 2018, in which she describes the AfD behind the scenes. The mass media focused in particular on their assertion that former party leader Frauke Petry was once advised by the President of the Federal Office for the Protection of the Constitution, Hans-Georg Maaßen. She supported this claim with an affidavit after the denial of the Federal Office for the Protection of the Constitution (Bundesamt für Verfassungsschutz).

== Literature ==
- 2018 Inside AFD: Der Bericht einer Aussteigerin, Europa Verlag, ISBN 978-3958902039
