= Arne Schönbohm =

Former president of the German Federal Office for Information Security (born 1969)

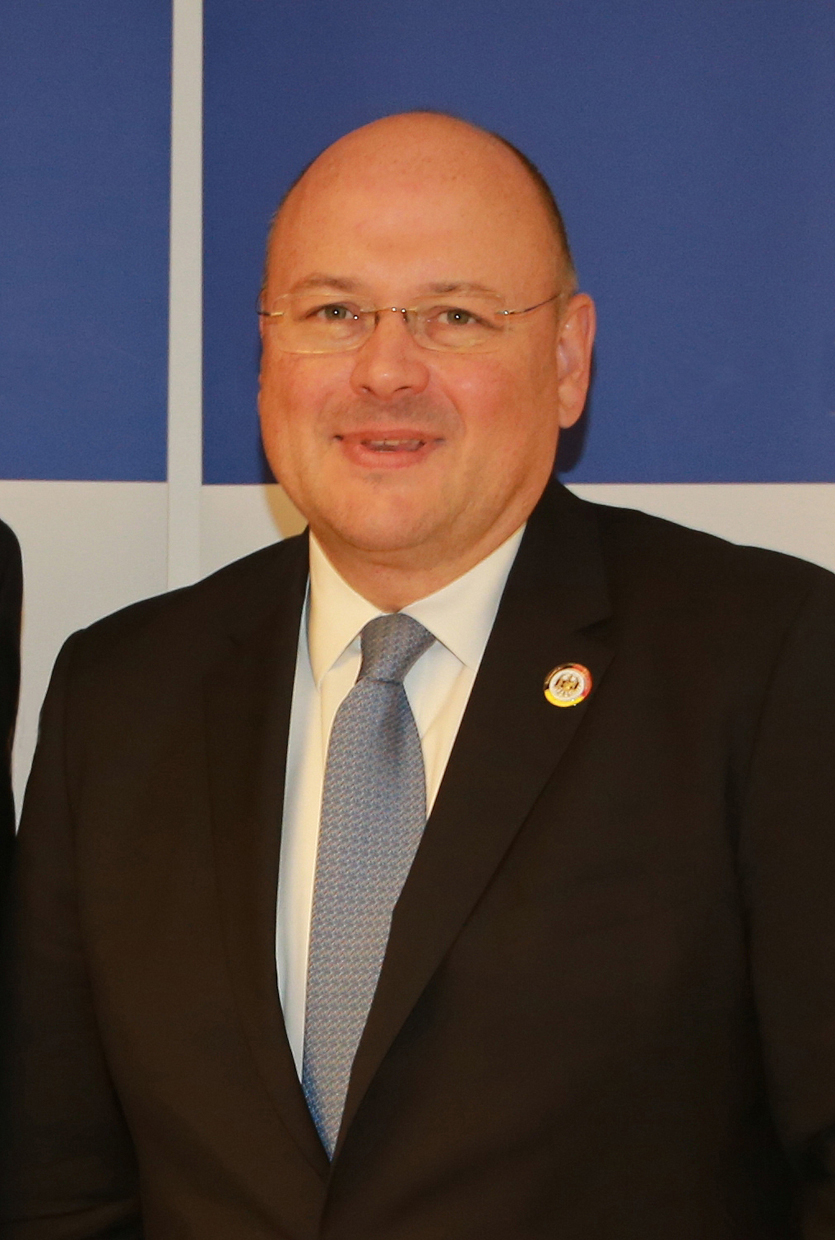
- Schönbohm in 2016
- Born: 28 July 1969 (age 57); Hamburg, Germany

Arne Schönbohm (born 28 July 1969) is the former president of the German Federal Office for Information Security.

== Biography ==
Schönbohm was born in Hamburg. He studied international business administration at the International School of Management in Dortmund, as well as in London and Taipei.

From 1995 until 2008 Schönbohm worked at EADS Germany in several senior positions, including as Vice President Commercial and Defense Solutions for EADS Secure Networks.

In 2008, he set up his own consulting business.

He was the chair of Cyber Security Council of Germany e.V., an association that later came under criticism for ties to Russian secret services.

Appointed by Minister of the Interior Thomas de Maizière (CDU), Schönbohm became president of the German Federal Office for Information Security (BSI) in 2016. In October 2022, under a new government, following a report by the satirical ZDF Magazin Royale on ZDF television, alleged connections to Russian secret services came under scrutiny again. As a result of the ensuing "BSI scandal" he was dismissed from his post shortly afterwards by the new Minister of the Interior Nancy Faeser (SPD) and later appointed to an equivalent post, as president of a federal academy.

== Other activities ==
- Deutschland sicher im Netz (DSIN), Member of the Advisory Board
- Foundation for Data Protection, Member of the Advisory Board
- Atlantik-Brücke, Member
