= Jaak Tarien =

Estonian military personnel

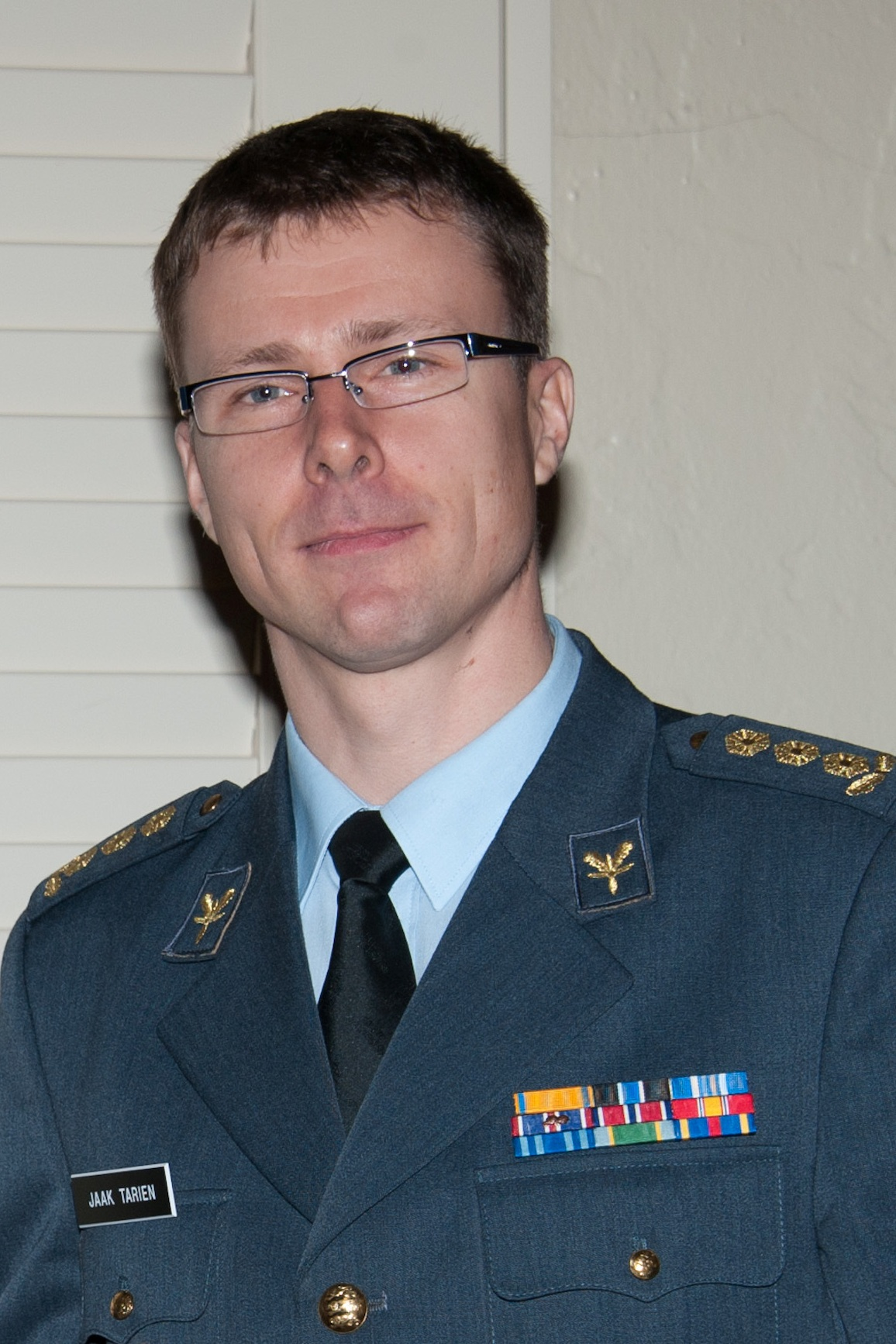
- Colonel Tarien in 2014
- Born: July 29, 1974 (age 51); Tallinn, then part of Estonian SSR, Soviet Union
- Allegiance: Estonia
- Branch: Estonian Air Force
- Service years: 1998 – present
- Rank: Brigadier General
- Commands: Estonian Air Force; NATO Cooperative Cyber Defence Centre of Excellence

Jaak Tarien (born 29 July 1974) is an Estonian military personnel (Brigadier General). and the current head of the Cooperative Cyber Defence Centre of Excellence since 2018.

Until 2018, he was the head of Estonian Air Force.

In 2003, he was awarded by the Order of the Cross of the Eagle, V Class.

== Effective dates of promotion ==
=== Estonian Land Forces ===
Promotions
| Insignia | Rank | Date |
|---|---|---|
| | 2nd Lieutenant | 1998 |
| | Lieutenant | 2001 |
| | Captain | 2003 |
| | Major | 2006 |
| | Lieutenant Colonel | 2010 |
| | Colonel | 2013 |
| | Brigadier General | 2022 |
