= Thomas Haldenwang =

German lawyer (born 1960)

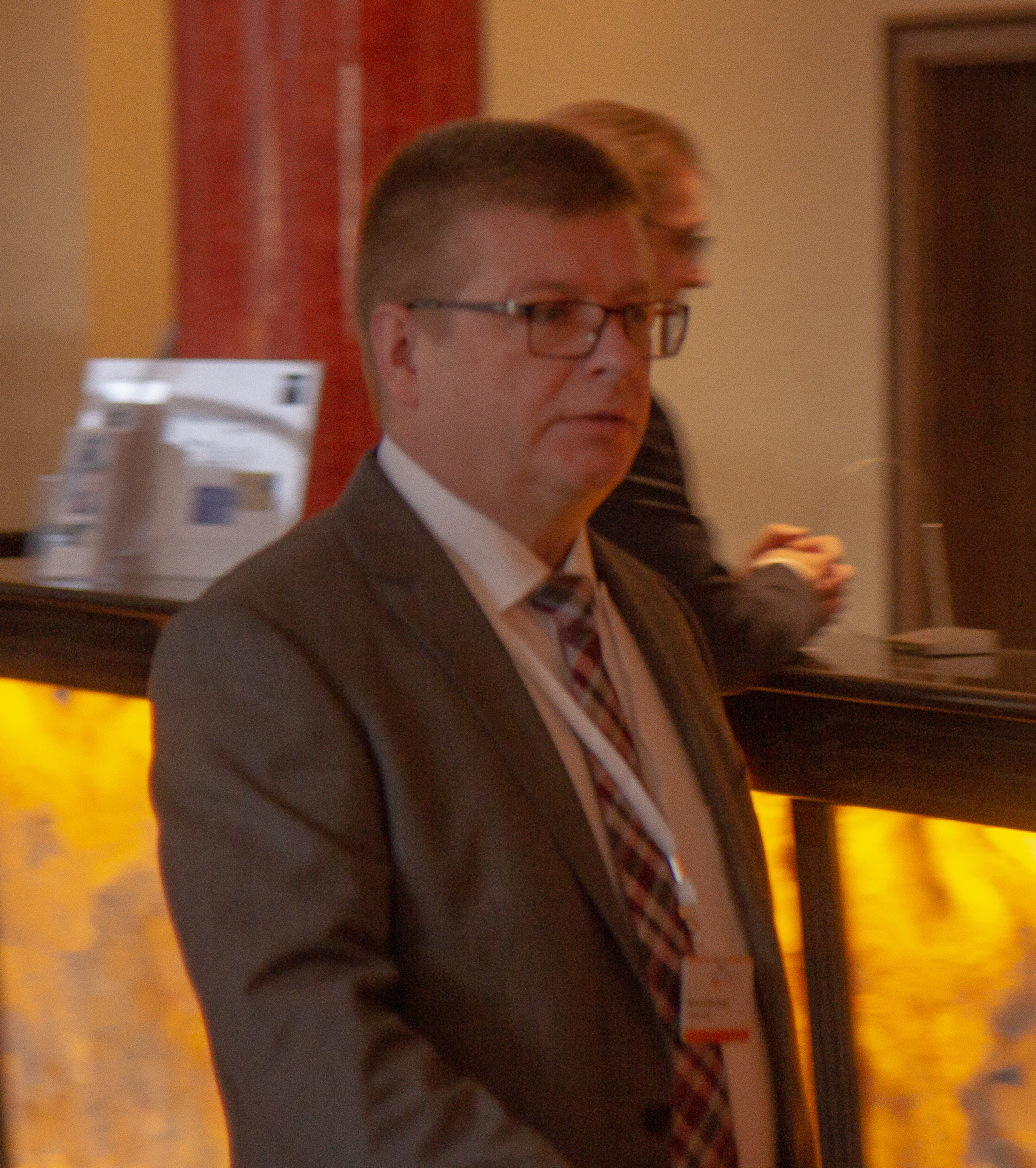
- Haldenwang in 2018

President of the Federal Office for the Protection of the Constitution
- In office November 2018 – 13 November 2024
- Preceded by: Hans-Georg Maaßen
- Succeeded by: Sinan Selen (acting)

Personal details
- Born: 21 May 1960 (age 66) Wuppertal, Germany
- Party: CDU
- Occupation: Lawyer

Thomas Haldenwang (born 21 May 1960) is a German lawyer and was president of the German Federal Office for the Protection of the Constitution (Bundesamt für Verfassungsschutz) from 2018 to 2024.

== Biography ==
Haldenwang was born in 1960 in Wuppertal and studied law at the University of Marburg.

Since November 2018 Haldenwang has been the president of the Bundesamt für Verfassungsschutz, a German intelligence agency with the mission to fight extremist adversaries of the federal constitution.

== BfV-presidency ==
After his appointment, he announced an increased focus of the BfV on right-wing extremism. The number of employees in this phenomenon area should be increased from 200 to 300.

In the murder case of Walter Lübcke, Haldenwang said that one might also have to assume a scenario of "sleepers" in the field of right-wing extremism – similar to that in the field of Islamism – and adapt accordingly to it. By classifying the AfD group Der Flügel as a "secured right-wing extremist aspiration", he is said to have become the enemy image of right-wing extremists, according to Der Spiegel.

Haldenwang pointed out from 2021 that the COVID-19 protest movement will become smaller, but more radical. "With violence-oriented right-wing extremists and in the radicalized corona protest milieu, no scenario can be ruled out," he said in January 2022. According to Haldenwang, there is "selective and in some regions a formative influence by right-wing extremists."

In early April 2024 Haldenwang wrote an opinion piece in the Frankfurter Allgemeine Zeitung, something very uncommon for presidents of the BfV. Regarding the Freedom of speech, as guaranteed in article 5 of the Basic Law for the Federal Republic of Germany, Haldenwang wrote, that certain opinions could result in investigation by the BfV, even if those opinions themself were protected by Freedom of speech. This drew criticism from several prominent journalists and commentators like Mathias Brodkorb, Rupert Scholz, Helmut Markwort, questioning Haldenwangs understanding of democracy and his qualification as BfV president.

With Haldenwang reaching the age of 65, he was expected to retire from public life at the end of 2024. In November 2024 he announced surprisingly to be a CDU candidate in the upcoming 2025 German federal election, aspiring to become a Member of the German Bundestag. His term as president of the BfV officially ended on 13 November 2024 with interior minister Nancy Faeser informing the parliament about his dismissal.

Haldenwang was direct candidate in Wuppertal I but did not win a seat for the Bundestag in the 2025 German federal election.
