= Schwarz Digits =

IT and digital services division of the Schwarz Group

Schwarz Digits KG
- Corporate logos of the companies belonging to the Schwarz Group, including Schwarz Digits
- Founded: 2023 (announcement)
- Founder: Schwarz Group (as corporate division)
- Type: Kommanditgesellschaft
- Headquarters: Bad Friedrichshall, Baden-Württemberg, Germany
- Fields: Information technology, Cloud computing, Cybersecurity
- Key people: Christian Müller (CEO)
- Parent organization: Schwarz Group
- Employees: c. 8,000 (2025)
- Website: schwarz-digits.de

Schwarz Digits KG is the IT and digital services division of Germany's Schwarz Group, based in Bad Friedrichshall, Baden-Württemberg. Established in 2023, the division provides IT and digital services in areas including cloud computing, cybersecurity, artificial intelligence, communication and workplace technologies. Its services include the STACKIT cloud platform. In fiscal year 2025, Schwarz Digits generated €2.2 billion in revenue.

== History ==
The Schwarz Group announced on 29 September 2023 the creation of Schwarz Digits as its fifth division to group IT and digital operations under a dual leadership. The move has been described as a shift by the retailer into providing IT services beyond its own retail operations.

Schwarz Digits had at launch about 7,500 employees and was led by co-CEOs Christian Müller and Rolf Schumann.

Prior to the reorganisation, the group expanded into cybersecurity by acquiring Israeli firm XM Cyber in November 2021 for about US$700 million.

In 2024 the group and the Deutsche Bahn announced DataHub Europe, a data platform to support AI applications; by October 2024 AuditGPT was cited as an initial use case. In August 2025, Deutsche Bahn stated that the platform had gone into operation with AuditGPT.

In July 2026, Schwarz Digits opened a new campus in Bad Friedrichshall. The campus initially comprises five buildings with space for around 3,500 employees, with later expansion stages expected to accommodate more than 5,000 employees.

== Infrastructure and data centers ==
Schwarz Digits operates its own data center infrastructure, which is used by companies of the Schwarz Group as well as external customers. Publicly documented locations include data centers in Neckarsulm and Ellhofen in Baden-Württemberg, Germany, and Ostermiething in Upper Austria.

In December 2024, Schwarz Digits announced plans to build a data-center campus on a 13-hectare site near Lübbenau, Brandenburg. The project comprises six buildings and is planned to have an initial electrical capacity of around 200 MW, with an announced investment of €11 billion. Construction began in November 2025, with the first three modules scheduled for completion by the end of 2027. The data center's waste heat is planned to be fed into Lübbenau's district-heating network for use in heating residential and commercial buildings.

In addition to the data center in Lübbenau, further data center sites are planned by the Schwarz Group. In August 2026, the Schwarz Group announced plans to build another data center in Dummerstorf, near Rostock, with a grid connection capacity of 240 MW by 2033. The investment is expected to amount to approximately €5.6 billion. The site could potentially be expanded to a grid connection capacity of up to 1 GW by 2045.

== Activities ==
Schwarz Digits encompasses several brands and activities:

- STACKIT – a cloud infrastructure and platform service developed within the group and opened to external clients with a focus on digital sovereignty.
- XM Cyber – a cybersecurity company acquired by Schwarz Group in 2021. In July 2026, CrowdStrike agreed to acquire XM Cyber's intellectual property as part of a broader partnership with Schwarz Digits. XM Cyber continues to operate and support its existing customers.
- E-commerce operations – IT and digital support for Lidl and Kaufland online operations.
- AI and data initiatives – including the DataHub Europe project with the Deutsche Bahn.

They announced a strategic investment and technology partnership with German AI developer Aleph Alpha via an investor consortium in November 2023.

== Partnerships ==
Early enterprise users and partners have adopted the STACKIT cloud and security portfolio, which is positioned to serve data sensitive European companies. A 2023 partnership in which SAP planned to use XM Cyber solutions has been reported.

A long-term partnership with Google was reported in November 2024, under which Google Workspace services would be hosted in Schwarz-operated data centers via STACKIT. The data residency in Germany and the European Union has been emphasized, including the migration of about 575,000 employees to Google Workspace.

In March 2025, the German Federal Office for Information Security, BSI, announced a cooperation with Schwarz Digits to develop sovereign cloud solutions for public administration in Germany.

In August 2025, Schwarz Digits also entered into a partnership with the Südwestrundfunk, Southwest Broadcasting corporation, to provide cloud solutions intended to strengthen the innovation capacity and competitiveness of the ARD and other public broadcasting organisations in Europe.

== Conferences and media ==
The division co-hosts the annual TECH convention in Heilbronn with Handelsblatt (first event 25–27 May 2025).

In 2025, the podcast Tech, KI & Schmetterlinge [Tech, AI and Butterflies] launched with journalist Sascha Lobo as host.

== Reception ==
Schwarz Digits is considered a credible regional challenger to large US cloud providers, while limits stemming from a smaller external partner ecosystem have been noted. The company plans to develop a sovereign hyperscale offering in Europe and is expanding its data centers' infrastructure accordingly.
