= Bundesfinanzdirektion =

Federal Head Office of Finance
- Bundesfinanzdirektion

Agency overview
- Formed: January 1, 2008
- Preceding agency: Oberfinanzdirektion
- Dissolved: December 31, 2015
- Superseding agency: Generalzolldirektion
- Jurisdiction: Government of Germany
- Headquarters: Hamburg, Cologne, Neustadt an der Weinstrasse, Nuremberg, Potsdam
- Minister responsible: Jörg Kukies, Federal Minister of Finance
- Parent agency: Federal Ministry of Finance
- Child agency: Hauptzollamt

The Bundesfinanzdirektionen were the German federal funding agencies with responsibility to the Federal Ministry of Finance that operated between 2008–2015. On January 1, 2016 it was replaced by the newly established German federal government's General Directorate Generalzolldirektion.

== History ==
In 2008 the Bundesfinanzdirektionen replaced the federal parts of the Oberfinanzdirektionen in Germany. This was decided by the Finance Ministry in its draft concept on the future of the federal financial administration on 6 November 2006 and the Law on federal financial administration Finanzverwaltungsgesetz was changed accordingly on 1 January 2008. The Bundesfinanzdirektionen were the supreme authority for the main customs offices.

On 1 January 2016 the Bundesfinanzdirektionen, the Zollkriminalamt and the Bildungs- und Wissenschaftszentrum der Bundesfinanzverwaltung were transformed into one Generalzolldirektion (General Directorate).

== Structure ==
The Bundesfinanzdirektionen were located in:

Hamburg (North)

main customs offices: Hamburg-Hafen, Hamburg-Jonas, Hamburg-Stadt, Itzehoe, Kiel, Stralsund, Oldenburg and Bremen

Cologne (West)

main customs offices: Münster, Aachen, Dortmund, Duisburg, Düsseldorf, Cologne, Krefeld, Frankfurt International Airport and Giessen

Neustadt an der Weinstrasse (Southwest)

main customs offices: Koblenz, Heilbronn, Karlsruhe, Lörrach, Singen, Stuttgart, Ulm, Saarbrücken and Darmstadt

Nuremberg (Southeast)

main customs offices: Erfurt, Landshut, Munich, Nuremberg, Regensburg, Rosenheim, Schweinfurt and Augsburg

Potsdam (Center)

main customs offices:Berlin, Frankfurt an der Oder, Potsdam, Dresden, Hanover, Magdeburg, Braunschweig, Bielefeld and Osnabrück.

The customs and consumption tax directorates of the Oberfinanzdirektionen Chemnitz (located in Dresden), Karlsruhe (located in Freiburg im Breisgau), Koblenz (located in Neustadt an der Weinstrasse), Cottbus (located in Potsdam), Hamburg, Cologne and Nuremberg are closed. The subordinate main customs offices are divided between the new Bundesfinanzdirektionen and some main customs offices have been attached to other Bundesfinanzdirektionen to make the BFD districts more even. This organisational change in the federal financial administration aims to evenly allocate the workload between the Bundesfinanzdirektionen. This is why the economically weak east of Germany has only one Bundesfinanzdirektion and the strong south and west have three BFDs in Cologne, Nuremberg and Neustadt an der Weinstrasse.
