= Federal agency (Germany) =

Federal agencies in Germany are established to assist the country's executive branch on the federal level according to Article 86 of the Basic Law for the Federal Republic of Germany (Grundgesetz). They are hierarchically organized on four levels:

- Top-level federal agencies (Oberste Bundesbehörden), which are distinguished from all other levels as they are specifically mentioned in the Grundgesetz. They include:
  - the office of the President of Germany (Bundespräsidialamt)
  - the office of the President of the Bundestag
  - the German Chancellery (Bundeskanzleramt)
  - the administrative office of the Bundesrat
  - the President of the Federal Constitutional Court (Bundesverfassungsgericht)
  - the Federal Court of Audit (Bundesrechnungshof)
  - the Representative of the Federal Government for Culture and Media (Kulturstaatsminister)
  - the Press and Information Agency of the Federal Government (Bundespresseamt)
  - the Federal Ministries led by the members of the German Cabinet
  - the executive board of the Deutsche Bundesbank
- As far as the authority of the federal legislature is concerned, further Upper-level federal agencies (Bundesoberbehörden) can be established. These agencies are directly attached subordinate to a federal ministry and mostly do not have any agencies subordinate to them, such as
  - the Bundesnachrichtendienst (subordinate to the German Chancellery)
  - the Federal Criminal Police Office, the Federal Office for the Protection of the Constitution, the Federal Office for Information Security, and the Technisches Hilfswerk (Federal Agency for Technical Relief)
  - the Federal Agency for Child and Youth Protection in the Media (Federal Ministry for Education, Family Affairs, Senior Citizens, Women and Youth)
  - the Federal Network Agency (Federal Ministry of Economics and Technology)
  - the Deutsches Patent- und Markenamt (Patent Office)
  - the Federal Agency for Nature Conservation and the Federal Agency for Radiation Protection (Federal Ministry for Environment, Nature Conservation and Nuclear Safety)
  - the Federal Agency for Materials Research and Testing (Federal Ministry of Economics and Technology)
  - the Federal Railway Authority and the Federal Agency for Aviation (Federal Ministry of Transport, Building and Urban Affairs)
  - the Zollkriminalamt (Customs enforcement agency)
- Middle-level federal agencies are situated between a federal ministry and the lowest administrative level. Their responsibilities are limited to specific regions, for example, the five Bundesfinanzdirektionen (subordinate to the Federal Ministry of Finance) or the four Military District Administrative Offices of the Bundeswehr (under the command of the Federal Minister of Defence).
- Low-level federal agencies are subordinate to middle-level agencies and are responsible for relatively small areas such as District Recruiting Offices, Waterways and Shipping Offices or Chief Customs Offices.

According to Article 83 of the Grundgesetz, federal laws are generally enforced by the executive branch of the German states, except for laws referring to those explicit items that are enumerated in the constitution itself. Therefore, the establishment of middle-level and low-level federal agencies is limited to the authority explicitly granted by constitutional law, such as foreign policy, public finance, waterways and shipping, border control, intelligence assessment, national security and criminal investigation as well as items concerning the Bundeswehr or aviation and railway issues.
