= Heli Tiirmaa-Klaar =

Estonian Cyber expert

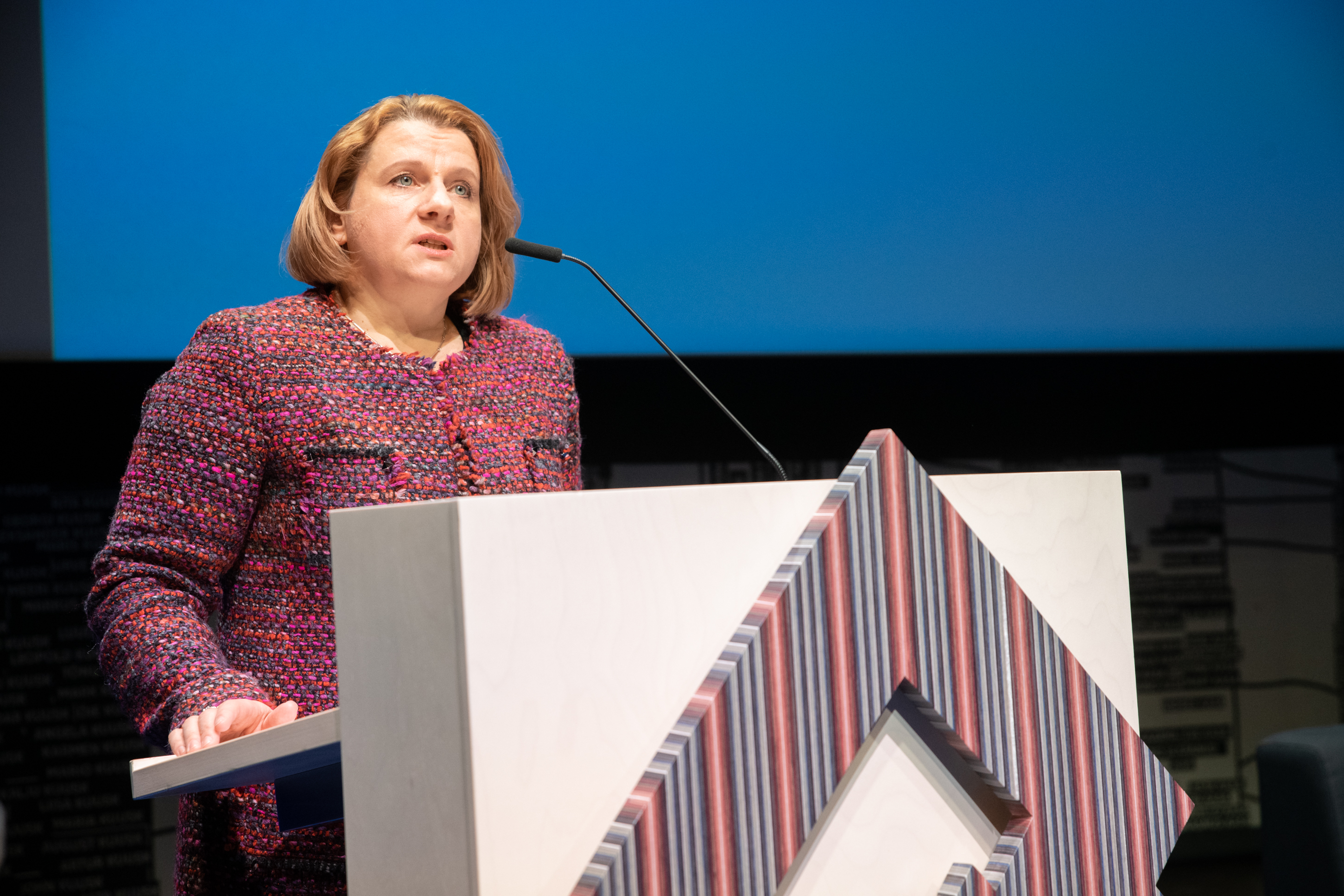
- Tiirmaa-Klaar in 2020
- Education: University of Tartu; Central European University
- Occupations: Cyber expert, diplomat
- Years active: 1995–present

Heli Tiirmaa-Klaar is an Estonian diplomat, cyber expert and Distinguished Fellow at the German Marshall Fund of the United States. Since 2023, she has chaired the multinational IT Coalition to assist Ukraine with IT technology and cyber defence issues.

== Biography ==
Heli Tiirmaa-Klaar completed a bachelor's degree in sociology from the University of Tartu in 1993 and a master's degree in political science at Central European University in 1995. During her studies, she completed exchanges at Aarhus University and George Washington University.

Between 2004 and 2006 she headed the International Studies Department at Tallinn University.

She worked at the Estonian Ministry of Defence since 1995 in various senior roles. In 2007-2010 she spearheaded the preparation of the first Estonian National Cyber Security Strategy and was managing the Estonian Cyber Security Council as a senior advisor to the Estonian Minister of Defence. From 2010 to 2011, she worked as a cyber defence policy advisor at the NATO Headquarters in Brussels. Her later activity led to the European Union sanction mechanism in response to cyber operations.

In September 2018 she was appointed as the first ambassador at large for cyber diplomacy of the Estonian Ministry of Foreign Affairs.

In December 2018, Heli Tiirmaa-Klaar was chosen as one of Politico's class of 2019, consisting of 28 people who will shape Europe in the year to come, and was designated as number 4 in the category "doers". She continues to lecture on cyber diplomacy and cyber security and is involved in various academic projects on global cyber issues.

== Publications (selected) ==
- Tiirmaa-Klaar, H. (2024). Cyber Diplomacy. In Diplomatic Tradecraft ed. by N. Kralev. Cambridge University Press.
- Tiirmaa-Klaar, H. (2016). Building national cyber resilience and protecting critical information infrastructure. Journal of Cyber Policy, 1(1), 94–106.
- Tiirmaa-Klaar, H., Gassen, J., Gerhards-Padilla, E. and Martini, P., (2013). Botnets: how to fight the ever-growing threat on a technical level. Springer, London.
- Tiirmaa-Klaar, H. (2013). Cyber diplomacy: Agenda, challenges and mission. Peacetime Regime for State Activities in Cyberspace, 509–531.
