= Justizvollzugsanstalt Celle =

German prison

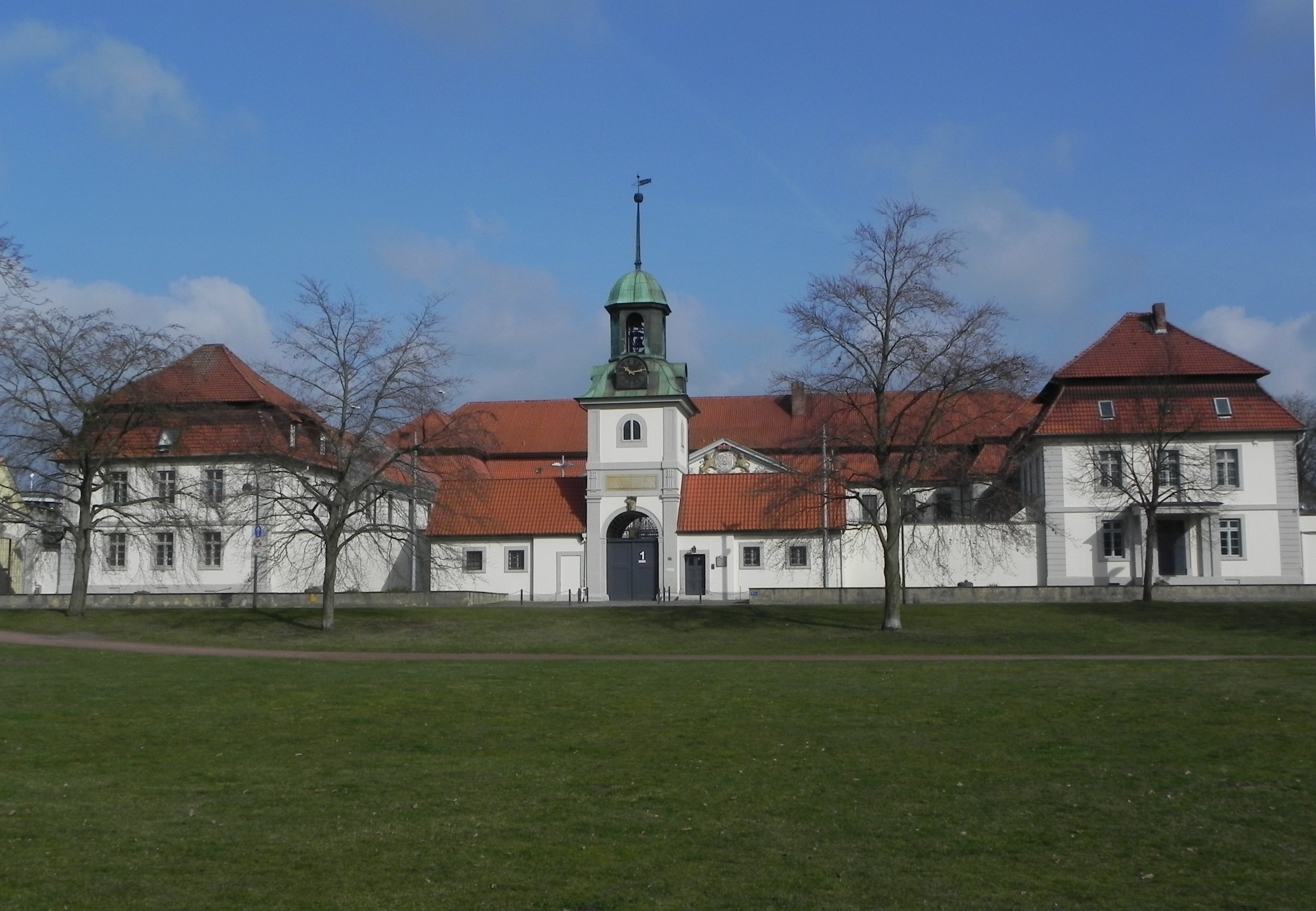
- Interactive map of Justizvollzugsanstalt Celle
- Location: Celle, Lower Saxony, Germany; 52°37′23″N 10°03′59″E
- Opened: 1724

Justizvollzugsanstalt Celle (or JVA Celle) is a high-security prison located in Lower Saxony, Germany. It institutionalizes male adult prisoners serving sentences from 14 years to life. The prison was built from 1710 to 1724. It was designed by Johann Caspar Borchmann, and it is considered the oldest functioning prison in Germany.
