= Cooperative Cyber Defence Centre of Excellence =

Military organization

NATO küberkaitsekoostöö keskus NATO Cooperative Cyber Defence Centre of Excellence
- Located in Signal battalion base Tallinn, Estonia

Site information
- Type: NATO Centre of Excellence
- Controlled by: NATO CCD COE Steering Committee
- Website: ccdcoe.org

Location
- Coordinates: 59°25′32.95″N 24°46′14.98″E

Site history
- Built: 2008

NATO CCD COE, officially the NATO Cooperative Cyber Defence Centre of Excellence (Estonian: K5 or NATO küberkaitsekoostöö keskus), is one of NATO Centres of Excellence, located in Tallinn, Estonia. The centre was established on 14 May 2008, it received full accreditation by NATO and attained the status of International Military Organisation on 28 October 2008. NATO Cooperative Cyber Defence Centre of Excellence is an international military organisation with a mission to enhance the capability, cooperation and information sharing among NATO, its member nations and partners in cyber defence by virtue of education, research and development, lessons learned and consultation.

== History ==
In 2003, prior to the country's official accession to NATO, Estonia proposed the creation of a Centre of Excellence. The 2006 Riga summit listed possible cyber attacks among the asymmetric threats to the common security and acknowledged the need for programs to protect information systems over the long term. The cyber attacks on Estonia in 2007 highlighted for the first time the potential vulnerability of any NATO countries, their institutions and societies, and even NATO itself to disruption or penetration of their information and communications systems.

Estonia's proposals for a NATO cyber excellence centre received strong support from the alliance's Secretary-General "Jaap" de Hoop Scheffer. NATO completed an assessment of the situation, partly in light of Estonia's experience, in April 2007, and approved a NATO policy on cyber defence in January 2008. NATO's summit communiqué in Bucharest in April announced NATO's readiness to "provide a capability to assist allied nations, upon request, to counter a cyber attack".

The need for a cyber-defence centre to be opened today is compelling. It will help NATO defy and successfully counter the threats in this area.

— General James Mattis in Brussels 14 May 2008.

On 30 August 2018, Colonel Jaak Tarien replaced Merle Maigre as the Director of the organisation.

== Overview ==
The Cyber Defence Center in Tallinn is one of 21 accredited Centres of Excellence (COEs), for training on technically sophisticated aspects of NATO operations. It is being funded nationally and multi-nationally as these centers are closely linked with Allied Command Transformation and promote the alliance-approved transformation goals.
The main agenda of the facility is to:

- improve cyber defence interoperability within the NATO Network Enabled Capability (NNEC) environment,
- design the doctrine and concept development and their validation,
- enhance information security and cyber defence education, awareness, and training,
- provide cyber defence support for experimentation (including on-site) for experimentation,
- analyze the legal aspects of cyber defence.

The centre has also other responsibilities which include:

- contribution to development of Cyber Defence Center practices and standards with NATO, PfP, NATO candidates and non-NATO nations,
- contribution to development of NATO security policies related to cyber defence its definition of scope and responsibility of military in cyber defence,
- carrying out cyber defence-focused training, awareness campaigns, workshops, and courses,
- developing and conducting cyber defence-focused exercises and its ability to provide CD exercise support,
- providing cyber defence SMEs to NATO and its ability in cyber defence testing and validating.

== Membership ==
As of March 2024, the CCD COE has 32 Sponsoring Nations, a status available only to NATO members.

- Albania
- Belgium
- Bulgaria
- Canada
- Croatia
- Czechia
- Denmark
- Estonia
- Finland
- France
- Germany
- Greece
- Hungary
- Iceland
- Italy
- Latvia
- Lithuania
- Luxembourg
- Montenegro
- Netherlands
- North Macedonia
- Norway
- Poland
- Portugal
- Romania
- Slovakia
- Slovenia
- Spain
- Sweden
- Turkey
- United Kingdom
- United States

The centre also has 7 non-NATO states as Contributing Participants as of March 2024. (Note: Finland joined NATO in April 2023 and should thus be listed as one of the Sponsoring Nations and not as one of the Contributing Participants. However, CCD COE webpage has not been updated accordingly. Moreover, Sweden is expected to join NATO in 2024.)

- Austria
- Australia
- Ireland
- Japan
- South Korea
- Switzerland
- Ukraine

Ukraine applied for membership in August 2021, a few months before the Russian invasion of Ukraine. Ukraine was accepted as a contributing participant in March 2022.

CCD COE's founding states are Estonia, Germany, Italy, Latvia, Lithuania, Slovakia and Spain. Hungary joined the centre in 2010, Poland and the United States joined in 2011, and the Netherlands joined in 2012. In 2013, France, United Kingdom, Czech Republic, and Austria as the first non-Nato country joined the centre. In November 2015, Finland, Greece and Turkey joined. In June 2019, Bulgaria, Denmark, Norway and Romania joined. Ireland joined the CCD COE in October 2019. In May 2022, South Korea joined the centre as the first Asian country. Japan then became the second Asian country to join in November 2022. Membership at CCD COE is open to all NATO member states. The centre can also establish cooperative relations with non-NATO states, universities, research institutions, and businesses as contributing participants.

== See also ==
- NATO Centres of Excellence
- ENISA
- Cyber-warfare
- Electronic warfare
- List of cyber warfare forces
- Proactive Cyber Defence
- National Cyberdefence Centre
- Tallinn Manual
