= Jaan Priisalu =

Estonian cyber security official

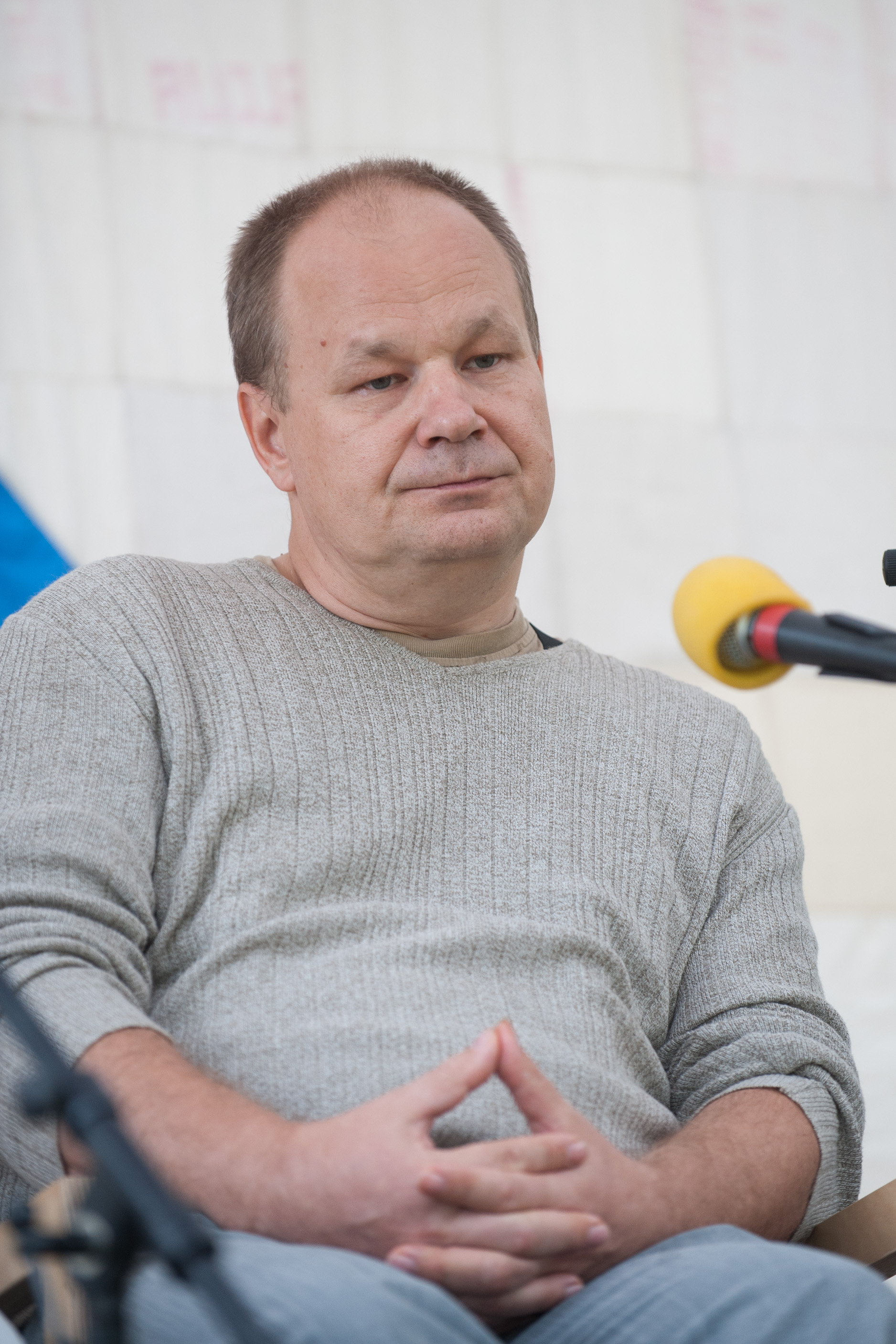
Jaan Priisalu

Jaan Priisalu (born 24 June 1967) is an Estonian cyber security official.

2011–2015, he was the Director General of Estonian Information System Authority (Estonian: Riigi Infosüsteemide Amet).

In 2014, he was awarded by Order of the White Star, III class.
