= May 8 =

May 8 this year in various calendars
- Friday, 8 May 2026
Akan	Kurufie
Armenian	22 Mareri 1475
Aztec	Xocotlhuetzi 18, 2 Miquiztli
Babylonian	20 Nisanu, 2337 SE
Balinese pawukon	Menga, Pasah, Laba, Keliwon, Paniron, Sukra of Taulu, Indra, Nohan, Sri
Bengali	25 Boisakh, BS 1433
Chinese	Yang Water Horse・Ox Mansion; Fire Horse Year, Month 3, Day 22 (Lixia, 13 days until Xiaoman)
Common Era	8 May 2026 CE
Coptic	30 Parmouti, AM 1742
Egyptian	22 Thoth, 2775 NE
Ethiopian	30 Miyāzyā, 2018 Amätä Məhrät
French Republican	Décade II, Nonidi de Floréal de l'Année 234 de la République
Gregorian	8 May, AD 2026
Hebrew	21 Iyar, AM 5786; Omer 36
Hindu	Uttarāṣāḍha・Śubha; Solar: 25 Vaiśākha, 1948 SE; Lunisolar: Ṣaṣṭhī, Kṛishna pakṣa of Vaiśākha, 2083 VE; Rāudra・5127 KY・1,872,703
Icelandic	Föstudagur, 16 Harpa 2026
Islamic	21 Dhu al-Qi'dah, AH 1447 (using tabular method)
ISO week date	2026-W19-5
Japanese	22 Yayoi, Reiwa 8 (Rikka, 13 days until Shōman)
Julian	25 April, AD 2026 (AM 7534)
Julian day	2461169
Korean	22 Yongdal, 4359 DE
Maya	13.0.13.10.6; 19 Uo, 2 Cimi
Roman	ante diem VII Kalendas Maias, MMDCCLXXIX AUC
Solar Hijri	18 Ordibehesht, SH 1405
Tibetan	22 nag pa, me pho rta 2153 or 1772 or 1000

<<	May					>>
Su	Mo	Tu	We	Th	Fr	Sa
					1	2
3	4	5	6	7	8	9
10	11	12	13	14	15	16
17	18	19	20	21	22	23
24	25	26	27	28	29	30
31
2026

May 8 in recent years
2026 (Friday)
2025 (Thursday)
2024 (Wednesday)
2023 (Monday)
2022 (Sunday)
2021 (Saturday)
2020 (Friday)
2019 (Wednesday)
2018 (Tuesday)
2017 (Monday)

May 8 is the 128th day of the year (129th in leap years) in the Gregorian calendar; 237 days remain until the end of the year.

== Events ==
=== Pre-1600 ===
- 453 BC – Spring and Autumn period: The house of Zhao defeats the house of Zhi, ending the Battle of Jinyang, a military conflict between the elite families of the State of Jin.
- 413 – Emperor Honorius signs an edict providing tax relief for the Italian provinces Tuscia, Campania, Picenum, Samnium, Apulia, Lucania and Calabria, which were plundered by the Visigoths.
- 589 – Reccared I opens the Third Council of Toledo, marking the entry of Visigothic Spain into the Catholic Church.
- 1360 – The Hundred Years War: the Treaty of Brétigny is drafted between King Edward III of England and King John II of France (the Good).
- 1373 – Julian of Norwich, a Christian mystic and anchoress, experiences the deathbed visions described in her Revelations of Divine Love.
- 1429 – The Hundred Years War: Joan of Arc lifts the Siege of Orléans, turning the tide of the war
- 1516 – A group of imperial guards, led by Trịnh Duy Sản, murder Emperor Lê Tương Dực and flee, leaving the capital Thăng Long undefended.
- 1541 – Hernando de Soto stops near present-day Walls, Mississippi, and sees the Mississippi River (then known by the Spanish as Río de Espíritu Santo, the name given to it by Alonso Álvarez de Pineda in 1519).

=== 1601–1900 ===
- 1608 – A newly nationalized silver mine in Scotland at Hilderston, West Lothian is re-opened by Bevis Bulmer.
- 1639 – William Coddington founds Newport, Rhode Island.
- 1721 – In the Papal States, Cardinal Michelangelo dei Conti is elected Pope, and takes the name Innocent XIII.
- 1788 – King Louis XVI of France attempts to impose the reforms of Étienne Charles de Loménie de Brienne by abolishing the parlements.
- 1794 – Branded a traitor during the Reign of Terror, French chemist Antoine Lavoisier, who was also a tax collector with the Ferme générale, is tried, convicted and guillotined in one day in Paris.
- 1821 – Greek War of Independence: The Greeks defeat the Turks at the Battle of Gravia Inn.
- 1842 – A train derails and catches fire in Paris, killing between 52 and 200 people.
- 1846 – Mexican–American War: American forces led by Zachary Taylor defeat a Mexican force north of the Rio Grande in the first major battle of the war.
- 1877 – At Gilmore's Gardens in New York City, the first Westminster Kennel Club Dog Show opens.
- 1886 – Pharmacist John Pemberton first sells a carbonated beverage named "Coca-Cola" as a patent medicine.
- 1898 – The first games of the Italian football league system are played.

=== 1901–present ===
- 1902 – In Martinique, Mount Pelée erupts, destroying the town of Saint-Pierre and killing over 30,000 people. Only a handful of residents survive the blast.
- 1919 – Edward George Honey proposes the idea of a moment of silence to commemorate the Armistice of 11 November 1918 which ended World War I.
- 1921 – The creation of the Communist Party of Romania.
- 1924 – The Klaipėda Convention is signed formally incorporating Klaipėda Region (Memel Territory) into Lithuania. It would come back to Germany in 1939.
- 1927 – Attempting to make the first non-stop transatlantic flight from Paris to New York, French war heroes Charles Nungesser and François Coli disappear after taking off aboard The White Bird biplane.
- 1933 – Mohandas Gandhi begins a 21-day fast of self-purification and launched a one-year campaign to help the Harijan movement.
- 1941 – World War II: The German Luftwaffe launches a bombing raid on Nottingham and Derby.
- 1942 – World War II: The German 11th Army begins Operation Trappenjagd (Bustard Hunt) and destroys the bridgehead of the three Soviet armies defending the Kerch Peninsula.
- 1942 – World War II: The Battle of the Coral Sea comes to an end with Imperial Japanese Navy aircraft carrier aircraft attacking and sinking the United States Navy aircraft carrier USS Lexington.
- 1942 – World War II: Gunners of the Ceylon Garrison Artillery on Horsburgh Island in the Cocos Islands rebel in the Cocos Islands Mutiny. Their mutiny is crushed and three of them are executed, the only British Commonwealth soldiers to be executed for mutiny during the Second World War.
- 1945 – World War II: The German Instrument of Surrender signed at Berlin-Karlshorst comes into effect. This is commemorated as Victory in Europe Day.
- 1945 – End of the Prague uprising, celebrated now as a national holiday in the Czech Republic.
- 1945 – Hundreds of Algerian civilians are killed by French Army soldiers in the Sétif massacre.
- 1945 – The Halifax riot starts when thousands of civilians and servicemen rampage through Halifax, Nova Scotia.
- 1946 – Estonian schoolgirls Aili Jõgi and Ageeda Paavel blow up the Soviet memorial which preceded the Bronze Soldier of Tallinn.
- 1950 – The Tollund Man is discovered in a peat bog near Silkeborg, Denmark.
- 1957 – South Vietnamese President Ngo Dinh Diem begins a state visit to the United States, his regime's main sponsor.
- 1963 – South Vietnamese soldiers under the Roman Catholic President Ngo Dinh Diem open fire on Buddhists defying a ban on the flying of the Buddhist flag on Vesak, killing nine and sparking the Buddhist crisis.
- 1967 – The Philippine province of Davao is split into three: Davao del Norte, Davao del Sur, and Davao Oriental.
- 1970 – The Beatles release their 12th and final studio album Let It Be.
- 1972 – Vietnam War: U.S. President Richard Nixon announces his order to place naval mines in major North Vietnamese ports in order to stem the flow of weapons and other goods to that nation.
- 1973 – A 71-day standoff between federal authorities and the American Indian Movement members occupying the Pine Ridge Reservation at Wounded Knee, South Dakota ends with the surrender of the militants.
- 1976 – The rollercoaster The New Revolution, the first steel coaster with a vertical loop, opens at Six Flags Magic Mountain.
- 1978 – The first ascent of Mount Everest without supplemental oxygen, by Reinhold Messner and Peter Habeler.
- 1980 – The World Health Organization confirms the eradication of smallpox.
- 1984 – Corporal Denis Lortie enters the Quebec National Assembly and opens fire, killing three people and wounding 13. René Jalbert, Sergeant-at-Arms of the Assembly, succeeds in calming him, for which he will later receive the Cross of Valour.
- 1984 – The Soviet Union announces a boycott upon the Summer Olympics at Los Angeles, later joined by 14 other countries.
- 1984 – The Thames Barrier is officially opened, preventing the floodplain of most of Greater London from being flooded except under extreme circumstances.
- 1987 – The SAS kills eight Provisional Irish Republican Army volunteers and a civilian during an ambush in Loughgall, Northern Ireland.
- 1988 – A fire at Illinois Bell's Hinsdale Central Office triggers an extended 1AESS network outage once considered to be the "worst telecommunications disaster in US telephone industry history".
- 1997 – China Southern Airlines Flight 3456 crashes on approach into Bao'an International Airport, killing 35 people.
- 2019 – British 17-year-old Isabelle Holdaway is reported to be the first patient ever to receive a genetically modified phage therapy to treat a drug-resistant infection.
- 2021 – A car bomb explodes in front of a school in Kabul, capital city of Afghanistan killing at least 55 people and wounding over 150.
- 2025 – The 2025 papal conclave elects Cardinal Robert Francis Prevost, taking the name Leo XIV as the 267th Pope of the Catholic Church.

== Births ==
=== Pre-1600 ===
- 1326 – Joan I, Countess of Auvergne (died 1360)
- 1427 – John Tiptoft, 1st Earl of Worcester, Lord High Treasurer (died 1470)
- 1460 – Frederick I, Margrave of Brandenburg-Ansbach (died 1536)
- 1492 – Andrea Alciato, Italian jurist and writer (died 1550)
- 1508 – Charles Wriothesley, English Officer of Arms (died 1562)
- 1521 – Peter Canisius, Dutch-Swiss priest and saint (died 1597)
- 1551 – Thomas Drury, English government informer and swindler (died 1603)
- 1587 – Victor Amadeus I, Duke of Savoy (died 1637)

=== 1601–1900 ===
- 1622 – Claes Rålamb, Swedish politician (died 1698)
- 1628 – Angelo Italia, Sicilian Jesuit and architect (died 1700)
- 1629 – Niels Juel, Norwegian-Danish admiral (died 1697)
- 1632 – Heino Heinrich Graf von Flemming, German field marshal and politician (died 1706)
- 1639 – Giovanni Battista Gaulli, Italian artist (died 1709)
- 1641 – Nicolaes Witsen, Mayor of Amsterdam, Netherlands (died 1717)
- 1653 – Claude Louis Hector de Villars, French general and politician, French Minister of Defence (died 1734)
- 1670 – Charles Beauclerk, 1st Duke of St Albans, English soldier and politician, Lord Lieutenant of Berkshire (died 1726)
- 1698 – Henry Baker, English naturalist (died 1774)
- 1720 – William Cavendish, 4th Duke of Devonshire, English politician, Prime Minister of the United Kingdom (died 1764)
- 1735 – Nathaniel Dance-Holland, English painter and politician (died 1811)
- 1737 – Edward Gibbon, English historian and politician (died 1794)
- 1745 – Carl Stamitz, German violinist and composer (died 1801)
- 1753 – Miguel Hidalgo y Costilla, Mexican priest and rebel leader (died 1811)
- 1786 – John Vianney, French priest and saint (died 1859)
- 1815 – Edward Tompkins, American lawyer and politician (died 1872)
- 1818 – Samuel Leonard Tilley, Canadian pharmacist and politician, 3rd Premier of New Brunswick (died 1896)
- 1821 – William Henry Vanderbilt, American businessman and philanthropist (died 1885)
- 1824 – William Walker, American physician, lawyer, journalist and mercenary (died 1860)
- 1825 – George Bruce Malleson, English-Indian colonel and author (died 1898)
- 1828 – Henry Dunant, Swiss businessman and activist, co-founded the Red Cross, Nobel Prize laureate (died 1910)
- 1828 – Charbel Makhluf, Lebanese monk and saint (died 1898)
- 1829 – Louis Moreau Gottschalk, American pianist and composer (died 1869)
- 1835 – Bertalan Székely, Hungarian painter and academic (died 1910)
- 1839 – Adolphe-Basile Routhier, Canadian judge, author, and songwriter (died 1920)
- 1842 – Emil Christian Hansen, Danish physiologist and mycologist (died 1909)
- 1846 – Oscar Hammerstein I, American businessman and composer (died 1919)
- 1850 – Ross Barnes, American baseball player and manager (died 1915)
- 1853 – Dan Brouthers, American baseball player and manager (died 1932)
- 1856 – Pedro Lascuráin, Mexican politician (died 1952)
- 1858 – Heinrich Berté, Slovak-Austrian composer (died 1924)
- 1858 – J. Meade Falkner, English author and poet (died 1932)
- 1859 – Johan Jensen, Danish mathematician and engineer (died 1925)
- 1867 – Margarete Böhme, German novelist (died 1939)
- 1876 – Ludvig Karsten, Norwegian painter (died 1926)
- 1876 – Protógenes Guimarães, Brazilian admiral and politician (died 1938)
- 1879 – Wesley Coe, American shot putter, discus thrower, and tug of war competitor (died 1926)
- 1884 – Harry S. Truman, American colonel and politician, 33rd President of the United States (died 1972)
- 1885 – Thomas B. Costain, Canadian journalist and author (died 1965)
- 1892 – Adriaan Pelt, Dutch journalist and diplomat (died 1981)
- 1893 – Francis Ouimet, American golfer (died 1967)
- 1893 – Edd Roush, American baseball player and coach (died 1988)
- 1893 – Teddy Wakelam, English rugby player and sportscaster (died 1963)
- 1895 – James H. Kindelberger, American businessman (died 1962)
- 1895 – Fulton J. Sheen, American archbishop (died 1979)
- 1895 – Edmund Wilson, American critic, essayist, and editor (died 1972)
- 1898 – Aloysius Stepinac, Croatian cardinal (died 1960)
- 1899 – Arthur Q. Bryan, American actor, voice actor, comedian and radio personality (died 1959)
- 1899 – Friedrich Hayek, Austrian economist and philosopher, Nobel Prize laureate (died 1992)
- 1899 – Jacques Heim, French fashion designer (died 1967)

=== 1901–present ===
- 1901 – Turkey Stearnes, American baseball player (died 1979)
- 1902 – André Michel Lwoff, French microbiologist and physician, Nobel Prize laureate (died 1994)
- 1903 – Fernandel, French actor and singer (died 1971)
- 1904 – John Snagge, English journalist (died 1996)
- 1905 – Red Nichols, American cornet player, composer, and bandleader (died 1965)
- 1906 – Roberto Rossellini, Italian director and screenwriter (died 1977)
- 1910 – Mary Lou Williams, American pianist and composer (died 1981)
- 1911 – Wilhelm Friedrich de Gaay Fortman, Dutch jurist and politician, Dutch Minister of The Interior (died 1997)
- 1911 – Robert Johnson, American singer-songwriter and guitarist (died 1938)
- 1912 – George Woodcock, Canadian author and poet (died 1995)
- 1913 – Bob Clampett, American animator, director, and producer (died 1984)
- 1913 – Sid James, South African-English actor and singer (died 1976)
- 1916 – João Havelange, Brazilian water polo player, lawyer, and businessman (died 2016)
- 1916 – Chinmayananda Saraswati, Indian spiritual leader and educator (died 1993)
- 1919 – Lex Barker, American actor (died 1973)
- 1920 – Saul Bass, American graphic designer and director (died 1996)
- 1920 – Barbara Howard, Canadian sprinter and educator (died 2017)
- 1920 – Tom of Finland, Finnish illustrator (died 1991)
- 1920 – Gordon McClymont, Australian ecologist and academic (died 2000)
- 1925 – Ali Hassan Mwinyi, Tanzanian politician, 2nd President of Tanzania (died 2024)
- 1926 – David Attenborough, English environmentalist and television host
- 1926 – David Hurst, German actor (died 2019)
- 1926 – Don Rickles, American comedian and actor (died 2017)
- 1928 – Ted Sorensen, American lawyer, 8th White House Counsel (died 2010)
- 1929 – John C. Bogle, American businessman, investor, and philanthropist (died 2019)
- 1929 – Miyoshi Umeki, Japanese-American actress and singer (died 2007)
- 1930 – Heather Harper, Northern Irish soprano (died 2019)
- 1930 – Doug Atkins, American football player (died 2015)
- 1930 – Gary Snyder, American poet, essayist, and translator
- 1934 – Leonard Hoffmann, Baron Hoffmann, South African-English lawyer and judge
- 1935 – Jack Charlton, English footballer and manager (died 2020)
- 1937 – Mike Cuellar, Cuban-American baseball player (died 2010)
- 1937 – Thomas Pynchon, American novelist
- 1938 – Jean Giraud, French author and illustrator (died 2012)
- 1940 – Peter Benchley, American author and screenwriter (died 2006)
- 1940 – Irwin Cotler, Canadian lawyer and politician, 47th Canadian Minister of Justice
- 1940 – Emilio Delgado, Mexican-American actor (died 2022)
- 1940 – Ricky Nelson, American singer-songwriter, guitarist, and actor (died 1985)
- 1940 – Toni Tennille, American singer-songwriter and keyboard player
- 1940 – William B. Jordan, American art historian (died 2018)
- 1941 – Bill Lockyer, American academic and politician, 30th Attorney General of California
- 1941 – James Traficant, American lawyer and politician (died 2014)
- 1942 – Norman Lamont, Scottish banker and politician, Chancellor of the Exchequer
- 1942 – Terry Neill, Irish footballer and manager (died 2022)
- 1943 – Pat Barker, English author
- 1943 – Gamini Lokuge, Sri Lankan politician (died 2025)
- 1944 – Gary Glitter, English singer-songwriter
- 1945 – Keith Jarrett, American pianist and composer
- 1947 – H. Robert Horvitz, American biologist and academic, Nobel Prize laureate
- 1947 – John Reid, Baron Reid of Cardowan, Scottish historian and politician, Secretary of State for Defence
- 1951 – Philip Bailey, American singer-songwriter, drummer, and actor
- 1951 – Mike D'Antoni, American basketball player and coach
- 1951 – Chris Frantz, American drummer and producer
- 1952 – Peter McNab, Canadian ice hockey player and sportscaster (died 2022)
- 1953 – Alex Van Halen, Dutch-American drummer
- 1954 – David Keith, American actor and director
- 1955 – Patrick Hanrahan, American computer graphics researcher
- 1955 – Mladen Markač, Croatian general
- 1956 – Jeff Wincott, Canadian actor and martial artist
- 1957 – Bill Cowher, American football player, coach, and analyst
- 1958 – Roddy Doyle, Irish novelist, playwright, and screenwriter
- 1958 – Brooks Newmark, American-English businessman and politician, Lord of the Treasury
- 1959 – Ronnie Lott, American football player and sportscaster
- 1960 – Franco Baresi, Italian footballer and coach (died 2026)
- 1961 – Bill de Blasio, American politician, 109th Mayor of New York City
- 1961 – David Winning, Canadian-American director, producer, and screenwriter
- 1963 – Anthony Field, Australian guitarist, songwriter, producer, and actor
- 1963 – Michel Gondry, French director and screenwriter
- 1964 – Melissa Gilbert, American actress and director
- 1966 – Eileen Bowman, American actress
- 1966 – Cláudio Taffarel, Brazilian footballer and coach
- 1967 – Viviana Durante, Italian ballerina and actress
- 1969 – Akebono Tarō, American-Japanese sumo wrestler, the 64th Yokozuna (died 2024)
- 1969 – John Timu, New Zealand rugby player
- 1970 – Michael Bevan, Australian cricketer and coach
- 1970 – Naomi Klein, Canadian author and activist
- 1970 – Luis Enrique, Spanish footballer and manager
- 1971 – Candice Night, American singer-songwriter
- 1972 – Darren Hayes, Australian singer-songwriter
- 1972 – Ray Whitney, Canadian ice hockey player
- 1973 – Jesús Arellano, Mexican footballer
- 1973 – Marcus Brigstocke, English comedian, actor, and screenwriter
- 1974 – Korey Stringer, American football player (died 2001)
- 1975 – Enrique Iglesias, Spanish-American singer-songwriter, producer, and actor
- 1976 – Martha Wainwright, Canadian-American singer-songwriter and guitarist
- 1977 – Joe Bonamassa, American singer-songwriter and guitarist
- 1977 – Bad News Brown, Canadian rapper, harmonica player, and actor (died 2011)
- 1977 – Theodoros Papaloukas, Greek basketball player
- 1978 – Lúcio, Brazilian footballer
- 1980 – Evgeny Lebedev, Russian-English publisher and philanthropist
- 1980 – Michelle McManus, Scottish singer-songwriter and actress
- 1981 – Stephen Amell, Canadian actor
- 1981 – Andrea Barzagli, Italian footballer
- 1982 – Buakaw Banchamek, Thai kick-boxer
- 1982 – Adrián González, American baseball player
- 1985 – Tommaso Ciampa, American wrestler
- 1986 – Galen Rupp, American runner
- 1987 – Felix Jones, American football player
- 1987 – Mark Noble, English footballer
- 1987 – Kurt Tippett, Australian footballer
- 1988 – Trisha Paytas, American media personality
- 1989 – Lars Eller, Danish ice hockey player
- 1990 – Lane Johnson, American football player
- 1990 – Iyo Sky, Japanese wrestler
- 1990 – Kemba Walker, American basketball player
- 1992 – Olivia Culpo, American model and actress
- 1992 – Kevin Hayes, American ice hockey player
- 1993 – Pat Cummins, Australian cricketer
- 1996 – 6ix9ine, American rapper
- 2001 – Jordyn Huitema, Canadian soccer player
- 2003 – Moulay Hassan, Crown Prince of Morocco
- 2005 – Oliver Bearman, English racing driver

== Deaths ==
=== Pre-1600 ===
- 535 – Pope John II
- 615 – Pope Boniface IV (born 550)
- 685 – Pope Benedict II
- 997 – Tai Zong, Chinese emperor (born 939)
- 1157 – Ahmed Sanjar, Seljuk sultan (born 1086)
- 1192 – Ottokar IV, duke of Styria (born 1163)
- 1220 – Rikissa of Denmark, queen of Sweden
- 1278 – Duan Zong, Chinese emperor (born 1269)
- 1319 – Haakon V, king of Norway (born 1270)
- 1473 – John Stafford, 1st Earl of Wiltshire, English politician (born 1420)
- 1538 – Edward Foxe, English bishop and academic (born 1496)
- 1551 – Barbara Radziwiłł, queen of Poland (born 1520)

=== 1601–1900 ===
- 1668 – Catherine of St. Augustine, French-Canadian nun and saint (born 1632)
- 1766 – Samuel Chandler, English minister and author (born 1693)
- 1773 – Ali Bey al-Kabir, Egyptian sultan (born 1728)
- 1781 – Richard Jago, English priest and poet (born 1715)
- 1782 – Sebastião José de Carvalho e Melo, 1st Marquis of Pombal, Portuguese politician, Prime Minister of Portugal (born 1699)
- 1785 – Étienne François, duc de Choiseul, French general and politician, Prime Minister of France (born 1719)
- 1785 – Pietro Longhi, Italian painter (born 1701)
- 1788 – Giovanni Antonio Scopoli, Italian physician and botanist (born 1723)
- 1794 – Antoine Lavoisier, French chemist and biologist (born 1743)
- 1819 – Kamehameha I, king of the Hawaiian Islands (born 1738)
- 1822 – John Stark, American general (born 1728)
- 1828 – Mauro Giuliani, Italian guitarist, cellist, and composer (born 1781)
- 1837 – Alexander Balashov, Russian general and politician, Russian Minister of Police (born 1770)
- 1842 – Jules Dumont d'Urville, French admiral and explorer (born 1790)
- 1853 – Jan Roothaan, Dutch priest, 21st Superior General of the Society of Jesus (born 1785)
- 1880 – Gustave Flaubert, French novelist (born 1821)
- 1891 – Helena Blavatsky, Russian-English mystic and author (born 1831)
- 1891 – John Robertson, English-Australian politician, 5th Premier of New South Wales (born 1816)
- 1893 – Manuel González Flores, Mexican general and president, 1880–1884 (born 1833)

=== 1901–present ===
- 1903 – Paul Gauguin, French painter and sculptor (born 1848)
- 1907 – Edmund G. Ross, American soldier and politician, 13th Governor of New Mexico Territory (born 1826)
- 1925 – John Beresford, Irish polo player (born 1847)
- 1936 – Oswald Spengler, German historian and philosopher (born 1880)
- 1941 – Natalie, queen consort of Serbia (born 1859)
- 1941 – Tore Svennberg, Swedish actor and director (born 1858)
- 1942 – Nikolai Reek, Estonian general and politician, 11th Estonian Minister of War (born 1890)
- 1943 – Mordechai Anielewicz, Polish commander (born 1919)
- 1944 – Themistoklis Diakidis, Greek high jumper (born 1882)
- 1945 – Frank Bourne, British soldier, last survivor of the Battle of Rorke's Drift (born 1854)
- 1945 – Julius Hirsch, German footballer (born 1892)
- 1945 – Wilhelm Rediess, German SS officer (born 1900)
- 1945 – Bernhard Rust, German lieutenant and Nazi politician (born 1883)
- 1945 – Josef Terboven, German lieutenant and Nazi politician, commissioner of German occupied Norway (born 1898)
- 1947 – Harry Gordon Selfridge, American-English businessman, founded Selfridges (born 1858)
- 1948 – U Saw, Burmese politician, Prime Minister of Burma (born 1900)
- 1950 – Vital Brazil, Brazilian physician and immunologist (born 1865)
- 1952 – William Fox, Austrian businessman, founded Fox Theatres (born 1879)
- 1959 – John Fraser, Canadian soccer player (born 1881)
- 1960 – J. H. C. Whitehead, Indian-English mathematician and academic (born 1904)
- 1965 – Wally Hardinge, English cricketer and footballer (born 1886)
- 1969 – Remington Kellogg, American zoologist and paleontologist (born 1892)
- 1972 – Pandurang Vaman Kane, Indian Indologist and Sanskrit scholar, Bharat Ratna awardee (born 1880)
- 1972 – Beatrice Helen Worsley, Mexican-Canadian computer scientist (born 1921)
- 1975 – Avery Brundage, American businessman and art collector (born 1887)
- 1980 – Geoffrey Baker, English Field Marshal and Chief of the General Staff of the British Army (born 1920)
- 1981 – Uri Zvi Greenberg, Israeli poet and journalist (born 1896)
- 1982 – Neil Bogart, American record producer, co-founded Casablanca Records (born 1943)
- 1982 – Gilles Villeneuve, Canadian race car driver (born 1950)
- 1983 – John Fante, American author and screenwriter (born 1909)
- 1984 – Lila Bell Wallace, American publisher, co-founded Reader's Digest (born 1890)
- 1984 – Gino Bianco, Italian-Brazilian race car driver (born 1916)
- 1985 – Robert Halperin, American yachtsman (born 1908)
- 1985 – Karl Marx, German conductor and composer (born 1897)
- 1985 – Theodore Sturgeon, American author and critic (born 1918)
- 1985 – Dolph Sweet, American actor (born 1920)
- 1986 – Ernle Bradford, English historian and author (born 1922)
- 1987 – Doris Stokes, English psychic and author (born 1920)
- 1988 – Robert A. Heinlein, American science fiction writer and screenwriter (born 1907)
- 1990 – Luigi Nono, Italian composer and educator (born 1924)
- 1991 – Jean Langlais, French pianist and composer (born 1907)
- 1991 – Rudolf Serkin, Czech-Austrian pianist and educator (born 1903)
- 1992 – Joyce Ricketts, American baseball player (born 1933)
- 1993 – Avram Davidson, American soldier and author (born 1923)
- 1994 – George Peppard, American actor and producer (born 1928)
- 1995 – Teresa Teng, Taiwanese singer (born 1953)
- 1996 – Beryl Burton, English cyclist (born 1937)
- 1996 – Luis Miguel Dominguín, Spanish bullfighter (born 1926)
- 1996 – Larry Levis, American poet, author, and critic (born 1946)
- 1996 – Garth Williams, American illustrator (born 1912)
- 1998 – Johannes Kotkas, Estonian wrestler (born 1915)
- 1998 – Charles Rebozo, American banker and businessman (born 1912)
- 1999 – Dirk Bogarde, English actor and screenwriter (born 1921)
- 1999 – Ed Gilbert, American actor (born 1931)
- 1999 – Dana Plato, American actress (born 1964)
- 1999 – Soeman Hs, Indonesian author and educator (born 1904)
- 2000 – Pita Amor, Mexican poet and author (born 1918)
- 2000 – Dédé Fortin, Canadian singer-songwriter and guitarist (born 1962)
- 2000 – Henry Nicols, American activist (born 1973)
- 2003 – Elvira Pagã, Brazilian vedette, singer, and artist (born 1920)
- 2005 – Jean Carrière, French author (born 1928)
- 2005 – Nicolás Vuyovich, Argentinian race car driver (born 1981)
- 2006 – Iain Macmillan, Scottish photographer and author (born 1938)
- 2007 – Philip R. Craig, American author and poet (born 1933)
- 2007 – Carson Whitsett, American keyboard player, songwriter, and producer (born 1945)
- 2008 – Eddy Arnold, American singer-songwriter, guitarist, and actor (born 1918)
- 2008 – François Sterchele, Belgian footballer (born 1982)
- 2009 – Dom DiMaggio, American baseball player (born 1917)
- 2011 – Lionel Rose, Australian boxer (born 1948)
- 2012 – Maurice Sendak, American author and illustrator (born 1928)
- 2012 – Ampon Tangnoppakul, Thai criminal (born 1948)
- 2012 – Roman Totenberg, Polish-American violinist and educator (born 1911)
- 2013 – Jeanne Cooper, American actress (born 1928)
- 2013 – Bryan Forbes, English actor, director, producer, and screenwriter (born 1926)
- 2013 – Juan José Muñoz, Argentinian businessman (born 1950)
- 2013 – Hugh J. Silverman, American philosopher and theorist (born 1945)
- 2014 – Roger L. Easton, American scientist, co-invented the GPS (born 1921)
- 2014 – Nancy Malone, American actress, director, and producer (born 1935)
- 2014 – Jair Rodrigues, Brazilian singer (born 1939)
- 2014 – Joseph P. Teasdale, American lawyer and politician, 48th Governor of Missouri (born 1936)
- 2015 – Zeki Alasya, Turkish actor and director (born 1943)
- 2015 – Mwepu Ilunga, Congolese footballer (born 1949)
- 2015 – Juan Schwanner, Hungarian-Chilean footballer and manager (born 1921)
- 2015 – Atanas Semerdzhiev, Bulgarian soldier and politician, 1st Vice President of Bulgaria (born 1924)
- 2016 – William Schallert, American actor; president (1979–81) of the Screen Actors Guild (born 1922)
- 2018 – Big Bully Busick, American professional wrestler (born 1954)
- 2018 – Anne V. Coates, British film editor (Lawrence of Arabia, The Elephant Man, Erin Brockovich), Oscar winner (1963) (born 1925)
- 2019 – Sprent Dabwido, President of Nauru from 2011 to 2013 (born 1972)
- 2021 – Helmut Jahn, German-American architect (born 1940)
- 2022 – Robert Gillmor, British wildlife artist and illustrator (born 1936)
- 2022 – Dennis Waterman, English actor and singer (born 1948)
- 2023 – Rita Lee, Brazilian musician and author (born 1947)
- 2024 – Chris Cannon, American politician (born 1950)
- 2024 – Jimmy Johnson, American football player (born 1938)
- 2024 – Pete McCloskey, American politician (born 1927)
- 2024 – Ramón Fonseca Mora, Panamanian novelist and lawyer (born 1952)
- 2025 – Simon Mann, British military officer and mercenary (born 1952)

== Holidays and observances ==
- Christian feast day:
  - Amato Ronconi
  - Pope Boniface IV
  - Apparition of Saint Michael
  - Arsenius the Great
  - Desideratus
  - Blessed Catherine of St. Augustine
  - Julian of Norwich (Anglican, Lutheran)
  - Magdalene of Canossa
  - Our Lady of Luján
  - Peter II of Tarentaise
  - Blessed Teresa Demjanovich (Ruthenian Catholic Church)
  - Blessed Ulrika Nisch
  - 19 Martyrs of Algeria
  - May 8 (Eastern Orthodox liturgics)
- Emancipation Day (Columbus, Mississippi)
- Furry Dance (Helston, UK)
- Liberation Day (Czech Republic)
- Miguel Hidalgo's birthday (Mexico)
- Parents' Day (South Korea)
- Truman Day (Missouri)
- Veterans Day (Norway)
- Victory in Europe Day, and its related observances (Europe):
  - Time of Remembrance and Reconciliation for Those Who Lost Their Lives during the Second World War, continues to May 9
  - Day of Remembrance and Victory over Nazism in World War II 1939 – 1945 (Ukraine)
- White Lotus Day (Theosophy)
- World Red Cross and Red Crescent Day (International)
