= Jogia =

Jogia is a surname. Notable people with the surname include:

- Avan Jogia (born 1992), Canadian actor, singer, writer, director, and activist
- Kunal Jogia (born 1984), British cricketer
- Shailesh Jogia (born 1975), British snooker player

== See also ==
- Jõgi
