= Syuejia Shang Baijiao incense-offering procession =

Syuejia Shang Baijiao Ancestral Veneration Ceremony is hosted by Syuejia Tzu Chi Temple in Tainan City, Taiwan. It is commonly known as the Shang Baijiao Festival and is held annually on the 11th day of the third lunar month. The ceremony is held at Touqian Liao, Jiangjun riverside to worship Baosheng Emperor's ancestral temple in China. The Incense-Offering, which was originally held irregularly, has now been expanded into a three-day procession and temple fair. Since 1992, it has been held once every four years. Known as "Syuejia Incense," it is one of the five major incenses of the Southern Taiwan region. It was officially recognized by the Tainan City government as a local folk festival and it was upgraded and registered by the ministry of culture as a national important folk custom in 2022.

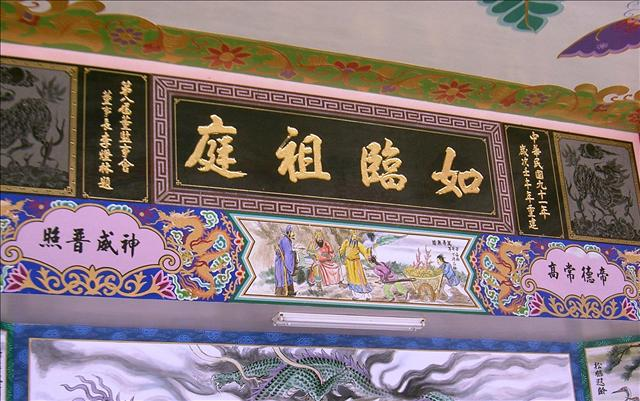
Inscription of Bai Jiao pavilion "As if in the ancestral pavilion"

== History ==
=== Origin ===
The main deity of Syuejia Tzu Chi Temple, Baosheng Emperor, was brought to Taiwan by immigrants from Quanzhou prefecture, Fujian. During the Ming-Zheng Period, accompanying Koxinga’s forces, they landed on the banks of the Jiangjun river at Syuejia Touqian Liao.

Historical records indicate that the Shang Baijiao ritual began in the Qing Dynasty, when villagers from Syuejia would frequently return to worship at the ancestral temple, Baijiao Tzu Chi Temple, in Quanzhou, Fujian. As Baosheng Emperor's birthday falls on the 15th day of the third lunar month, they would set sail a few days early, on the 11th day of the third lunar month, to ensure arrival in time for the celebration.

After the Taiwan under Japanese rule period, due to restrictions on cross-strait exchanges and inconvenient checkpoints, the ritual was gradually shifted to the location of the original landing site for a distant ceremony honoring the ancestors across the sea. The Shang Baijiao ceremony was not initially held annually; it was only in the latter half of the 20th century that it became an annual event.

=== Development ===
The Shang Baijiao ceremony was originally a township-level festival in the Syuejia area, primarily involving temples affiliated with Syuejia Tzu Chi Temple, including associated temples, branch temples and the temples of the "Syuejia Thirteen Villages."

Around 1977, a trend of tracing cultural roots emerged in Taiwan. The Shang Baijiao ceremony has been supported by the government and gradually elevated the scale and significance of the festival.

Starting in 1980, the ceremony was elevated to a county-level festival, and the mayor of Tainan County serves as the festival director.

In 1981, coincidentally with the 70th anniversary of the founding of the Republic of China, the ceremony was hosted by Lin Yang-kang, the then Chairman of the Taiwan Provincial Government, and it included competitions of traditional performances and cultural exhibitions.

In 1984, Wu Sanlian, a Tainan business gang leader and former Taipei mayor who was born in Syuejia, served as the chairman of the committee.

Since 1989, the Minister of the Interior has been appointed as the chairman of the committee. However, in the past years, the actual officiant was still the county magistrate of Tainan County. Currently, due to the merger and upgrade of the county and city, the mayor of Tainan is now the officiant. If the county or city chief cannot attend, the deputy chief will preside over the ceremony. In recent years, former Minister of Education Wu Qingji has served as the chairman.

=== Syuejia Incense ===
In addition to the annual Shang Baijiao ancestral worship ceremony and procession, the Shang Baijiao incense offering route mainly passes through Syuejia and Zhongzhou, leaving out other districts from the procession route.

To pray for the safety of districts that have not been passed by the Shang Baijiao Incense-Offering Procession, Tzu Chi Temple organized a separate three-day Incense-Offering event that travels through the Syuejia Thirteen villages, known as the "Syuejia Incense."

Before 1987, the date for the event was determined by divination in front of the Baosheng Emperor. Afterward, the date was decided by the Tzu Chi Temple congregation representatives. The Incense-Offering event took place in 1971, 1978, 1984, 1988, 1992, 1996, 2000, 2004, 2008, 2012, and 2016, almost solidifying the tradition of holding the event every four years.

However, the 2020 Gengzi year Incense-Offering event was postponed to 2022 due to the COVID-19 pandemic. The next event is scheduled for 2024. During Incense-Offering years, the procession is held from the 9th to the 11th day of the third lunar month.

== Detour Area ==
The annual Shang Baijiao festival procession primarily covers the areas of Syuejia and Zhongzhou.

However, during the three-day Incense-Offering event, the procession expands to include the historic "Syuejia Thirteen Village" area, which encompasses Sanliaowan, Xidiliao, Erzhonggang, Huiyaogang, Duozitou, Zhaizigang, Daofengliao, Syuejialiao, Caoding, Dawan, Syuejia, Zhongzhou, and Shanliao. It even extends to the entire modern Syuejia District, as well as neighboring villages in Jiali District, Yanshui District, and Beimen District.

During the Incense-Offering event, each day’s procession inevitably crosses into an area outside the Syuejia Tzu Chi Temple’s traditional religious sphere, referred to as "crosses the boundary".

On the first day, the procession "crosses the boundary" into Xizhou Community in Jiali District, and in earlier times, it extended to Yingding and Jialixing in Jiali District.

On the second day, it "crosses the boundary" into Dapu in Yanshui District.

On the third day, it "crosses the boundary" into Xiziliao in Beimen District.

== Incense parade ==
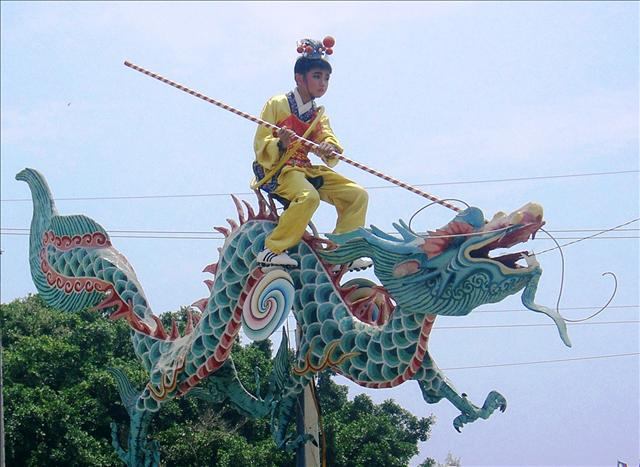
The Shang Baijiao Matsuri float "Nezha conquers the Eastern Sea."

=== Matsuri float ===
The Shang Baijiao festival involves participation from 70 to 80 temples and shrines, accompanied by a variety of performance troupes. Among these, the "Matsuri float" featuring children dressed as characters and seated on floats, are particularly famous in Taiwan. It also known as "Festival float", this tradition dates back to the Qing Dynasty. Originally, they were carried by manpower or displayed on ox carts, but nowadays, they are mounted on vehicles powered by mechanical engines and depict scenes from mythology, folklore, and historical stories.

Currently, the matsuri float predominantly feature real actors in costume. Regular participants including :

- Xiashe Baijiao Temple with "Nezha's Chaos in the Eastern Sea" and "Dong Han Searching for His Mother."
- Zhaikou Xingtai Temple with "Five Tigers Conquering the West" and "The Prince Subdues the Dragon."
- Luoxingjiao with "The Eight Immortals' Pavilion."
- San Jiaozai Qingbao Temple with "The Eight Immortals Crossing the Sea."
- Dong Zhuwei with "The Eight Beauties."
- Houshe Shenghe Temple with "Guo Ziyi’s Battle Against Wu Feng Xian."
- Zhong Caodi Zhonglong Temple with "The Spinning Wheel."
- Xian Neijiao Tai'an Temple with "The Investiture of the Gods."
- Xilong Temple with "The Seven Cranes."

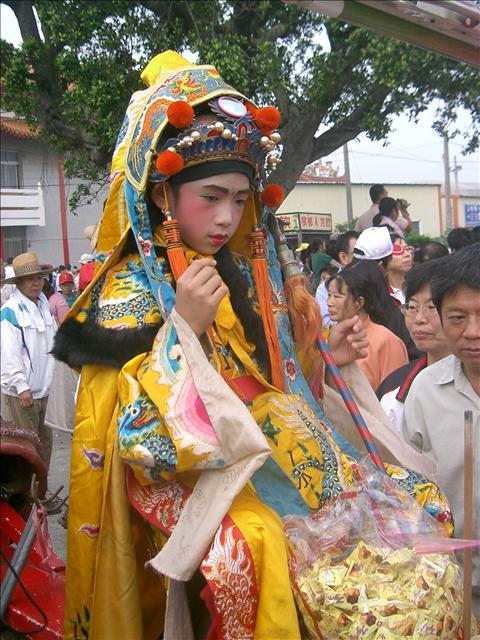
God's children of Centipede Parade

=== Centipede Parade ===
The five major Incense-Offering events of southwestern Taiwan all feature centipede parade as the leading procession, with the centipede parade for the Syuejia Shang Baijiao festival organized by Houshe Jihe Temple. It is the only formation among the five major Incense-Offering events still carried entirely by manpower.

The Syuejia centipede parade consists of 36 children performers dressed as divine characters. Their roles are determined by divination through registration by devotees from various regions, who pay a set fee to Jihe Temple. The fee covers the costs of costumes, decorations, and the wages for the carriers, who collaborate to lift and carry the parade.

The Syuejia centipede parade features a dragon head with a phoenix tail. These components collectively referred to as the "Lord Centipede" , are enshrined in Jihe Temple when not in use. The themes of the centipede formation are the most diverse among the five major Incense-Offering events, drawing from historical and legendary works from the Tang and Song dynasties.

A total of thirteen storylines are depicted, including :

- Luo Tong Sweeping the North
- Xue Rengui’s Eastern Expedition
- Xue Dingshan’s Western Expedition
- Legends of Sui and Tang Dynasties
- White Tiger Battles Azure Dragon
- Xue Gang’s Lantern Rebellion
- Guo Ziyi’s Battle Against the Annam Kingdom
- Di Qing Escorting the Army Uniforms
- Five Tigers Conquering the West
- Five Tigers Conquering the South
- Di Qing’s Battle with Princess Babao
- Water Margin
- The Legend of Yue Fei

Each year, the specific storyline to be enacted is decided by divination.

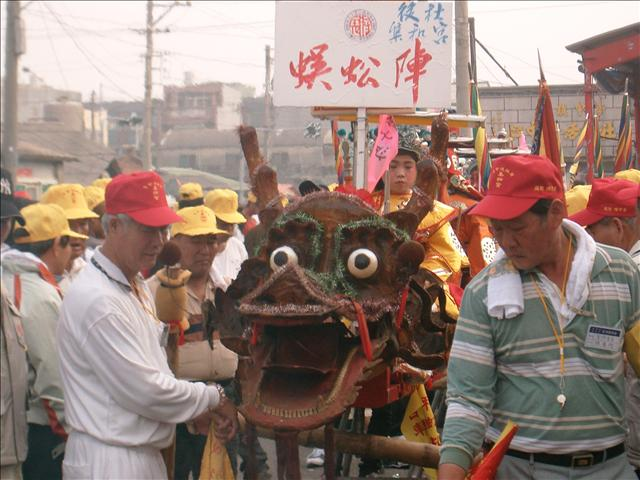
Centipede Parade of Syuejia Houshe

The Syuejia centipede parade, which preserves the tradition of being carried entirely by manpower, requires a significant amount of labor. In the past, there were discussions about switching to a wheeled and towed system. However, after multiple rounds of divination, the proposal did not receive divine approval, and the tradition of manual carrying was maintained.

If a three-shift system is used, over 200 carriers are needed. Historically, disputes over wages have often led to strikes by the carriers, prompting requests for assistance from the military in earlier times. With the labor dynamics of modern society vastly different from those of the agricultural era, labor shortages have become increasingly severe in recent years, and the issue remains unresolved to this day.

During the 2022 Renyin year Incense-Offering Procession, an unprecedented situation occurred. On the second day of the procession, the return to the temple lasted until early morning on the third day, at around 4 a.m. When the procession departed from Jihe Temple on the third day and proceeded to Tzu Chi Temple to receive the ritual orders, a shortage of carriers immediately arose, causing a delay of over five hours.

Tzu Chi Temple initially planned to bypass the original Incense-Offering route and proceed directly to Baijiao Pavilion to await the ceremony. However, with urgent recruitment of part-time employee by Tzu Chi Temple and Jihe Temple, combined with the enthusiastic support of local Syuejia residents and devotees from outside the area, the procession resumed its journey from the temporary rest stop at Zhongshe Songjiang Hall toward Tougang Village, eventually rejoining the incense route.

== Structure of the procession ==
The incense procession formation for the Shang Baijiao ancestral worship ceremony can generally be divided into three parts: the "Vanguard Formation," the "Participating Temples in the Procession," and the "Main Deity Formation." Starting in the 1980s, Syuejia Tzu Chi Temple politely declined the participation of electronic parade floats in the incense procession. In recent years, the policy has slightly relaxed, but such occurrences remain rare.
