= Jõgi =

Family name

Jõgi is an Estonian word and surname meaning 'river'. Notable people with the name include:

- Aili Jõgi (1931–2017), Estonian schoolgirl who blew up a Soviet War monument in 1946
- Aino Jõgi (1922–2013), Estonian linguist, professor and translator
- Helmer Jõgi (born 1952), Estonian politician
- Ülo Jõgi (1921–2007), Estonian war historian, patriot and member of Estonian resistance against the Soviet occupation of Estonia
