= 453rd =

453rd may refer to:

- 453d Electronic Warfare Squadron, United States Air Force unit
- 453d Operations Group, inactive United States Air Force unit

== See also ==
- 453 (number)
- 453, the year 453 (CDLIII) of the Julian calendar
- 453 BC
