= Sanyue =

Third month of the Chinese calendar

Sānyuè

Chinese name
- Chinese: 三月
- Hanyu Pinyin: Sānyuè
Transcriptions
Standard Mandarin
- Hanyu Pinyin: Sānyuè

Korean name
- Hangul: 삼월
- Hanja: 三月
Transcriptions
- Revised Romanization: Samwol

Traditional Korean name
- Hangul: 용달
- Hanja: 辰月
Transcriptions
- Revised Romanization: Yongdal

Japanese name
- Kanji: 三月
- Kana: さんがつ
Transcriptions
- Romanization: Sangatsu

Traditional Japanese name
- Kanji: 弥生
- Kana: やよい
Transcriptions
- Romanization: Yayoi

Sānyuè (Chinese: 三月) is the third month of the Chinese calendar and calendars based on it, such as the Japanese calendar, Korean calendar and Vietnamese calendar. It follows Èryuè and precedes Sìyuè. It is known in Japanese as Sangatsu (Japanese: 三月) or traditionally Yayoi (Japanese: 弥生), and in Korean as Samwol (Korean: 삼월; Hanja: 三月) or traditionally Yongdal (Korean: 용달; Hanja: 辰月). All of these words can also refer to the month of March in the Gregorian calendar.

== Names ==
In Mandarin Chinese, traditional names of the month include táoyuè (Chinese: 桃月), jìchūn (Chinese: 季春), mùchūn (Chinese: 暮春) and cányuè (Chinese: 蠶月／蚕月).

In Japanese, the month is known as sangatsu (Japanese: 三月) or traditionally yayoi (Japanese: 弥生). The name yayoi has been connected with the increasing growth of plants in spring. One proposed derivation is from iyaohi (弥生), referring to plants growing more and more; another connects it with yayaohi (漸々成長), which means to gradually grow. Other Japanese names include hanamizuki (Japanese: 花見月) and sakurazuki (Japanese: 桜月).

== Observances ==
- The Shangsi Festival (called Samjinnal in Korea) is held on the 3rd day of the 3rd month.
- Hinamatsuri, the Japanese festival associated with dolls, was traditionally held on the 3rd day of the 3rd month.
- Hamauri (浜下り) is held around the 3rd day of the 3rd month in Okinawa and the Amami Islands. Its customs include visits to the seashore and gathering shellfish.
- The Syuejia Shang Baijiao incense-offering procession is held on the 11th day of the 3rd month in Taiwan.

== Dates ==
Below is a list of the start and end dates of Sānyuè in the Gregorian calendar. Because the 1-hour difference between China and Japan/Korea occasionally affects the date on which a new moon occurs, the dates below can differ from those of the Japanese and Korean calendars.

Dates of Sānyuè
| Year | First day | Last day |
|---|---|---|
| 2016 | 7 April | 6 May |
| 2017 | 28 March | 25 April |
| 2018 | 16 April | 14 May |
| 2019 | 5 April | 4 May |
| 2020 | 24 March | 22 April |
| 2021 | 12 April | 11 May |
| 2022 | 1 April | 30 April |
| 2023 | 20 April | 18 May |
| 2024 | 9 April | 7 May |
| 2025 | 29 March | 27 April |
| 2026 | 17 April | 16 May |
| 2027 | 7 April | 5 May |
| 2028 | 26 March | 24 April |
| 2029 | 14 April | 12 May |
| 2030 | 3 April | 1 May |
| 2031 | 23 March | 21 April |
| 2031 (leap) | 22 April | 20 May |
| 2032 | 10 April | 8 May |
| 2033 | 31 March | 28 April |
| 2034 | 19 April | 17 May |
| 2035 | 8 April | 7 May |
| 2036 | 28 March | 25 April |
