= Centipede parade of Syuejia Jihe Temple =

Traditional annual parade in Taiwan

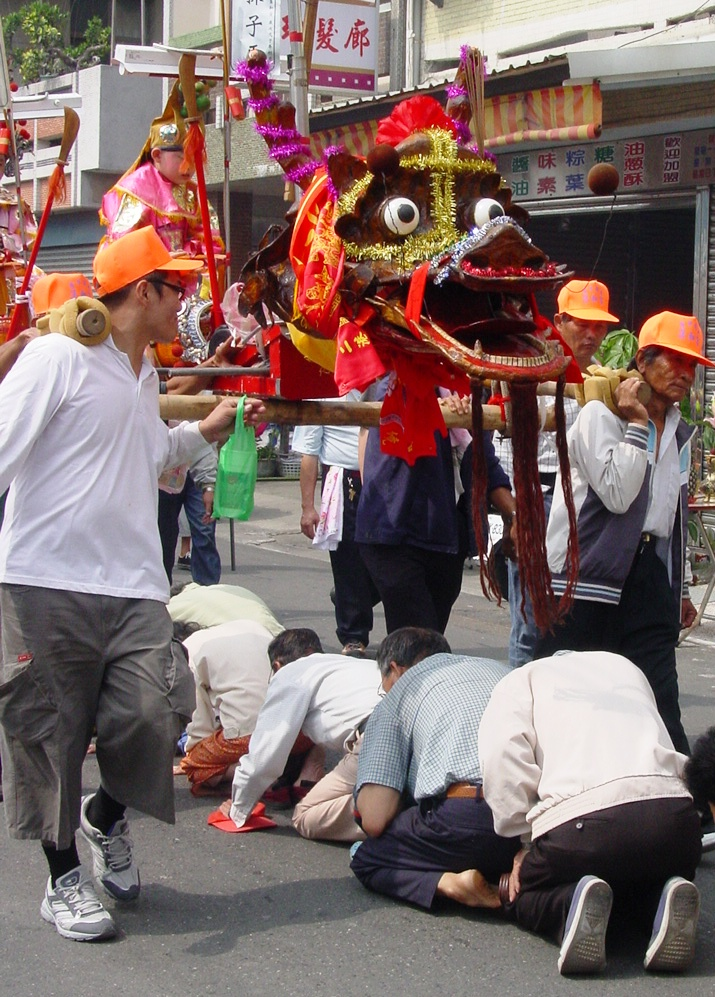
- Genre: Traditional performing arts
- Date: 11th day of the 3rd lunar month
- Locations: Syuejia District, Tainan City, Taiwan
- Inaugurated: May 1, 2009 (the 98th year of the Republic of China)

The Centipede parade of Syuejia Jihe Temple is the only traditional parade formation in Taiwan that is intended to be performed by manual labour alone from beginning to end.

== History ==
The main structure that participants carry during the centipede parade is formed by connecting long wooden planks and is capable of moving laterally with ease. This wooden structure is designed to resemble a centipede's body, making it appear like a crawling centipede during the procession. One or two children sit on each wooden plank, portraying historical figures or deities. The display serves a religious purpose, as participants bless the local area and ward off evil spirits. This parade formation is also known as the "centipede of living figures".

Traditionally, the wooden structure was carried entirely by human strength, with no assistance from animals or machines. Recently, the parade route has expanded, and recruiting sufficient volunteers to carry the structure along the whole parade has grown more difficult. Rising labor costs have also prompted many practitioners of this rite to mount wheels beneath their centipede structure, allowing it to be pushed along the ground during the parade. Some groups even use vehicles to pull the formation from the front. In practice, this performance is steadily being undertaken with the aid of more non-human tools.

The centipede parade of Syuejia Jihe Temple originated from the centipede formation festival float of Syuejia Baijiao Temple. Syuejia Jihe Temple preserves the traditional custom of Syuejia Baijiao by carrying out the parade formation using the traditional manpower method. Syuejia Jihe Temple's version of the centipede parade was designated as a National Important Traditional Folk Custom in 2006 (the 95th year of the Republic of China).

== Traditions ==
Unlike other centipede parades, the centipede parade of Jihe Temple requires its central wooden structure be supported by human strength, without any external assistance, throughout the pilgrimage procession. The performance requires over a hundred participants to complete and was once performed by over 200 participants.

The structure (also called the Centipede Lord) has the head of a dragon but the tail of a phoenix. This design was first used in 1991 (the 80th year of the Republic of China). Jihe Temple administrators, in order to honor and celebrate the origins of the Centipede Lord, specially invited the Baosheng Emperor of Syuejia Tzu Chi Temple to descend in spirit and grace the occasion.

The Centipede Lord is a transformed version of the Azure Dragon deity with the natural power to ward off evil. It is said that, having rendered meritorious service in assisting the Baosheng Emperor in subduing evil and expelling demons, the Centipede Lord was appointed as his personal guardian by imperial decree. The Centipede Lord's birthday is designated as the 25th day of the sixth lunar month. Since the Centipede Lord is an attendant deity of the Baosheng Emperor, whenever Jihe Temple's centipede parade passes through neighborhoods during a pilgrimage procession, local residents always prepare incense tables to offer their worship. Along the procession route, devotees often kneel in prayer to the Centipede Lord in the middle of the road, hoping that the parade structure will pass over them, bringing peace, prosperity, and health to the community. This practice has also become a distinctive cultural tradition in Syuejia.

== Procession ==
When the centipede parade begins, the children seated on its body typically perform roles drawn from historical tales or divine legends, portraying important people and deities. Each performance of the parade will often select different stories to depict in the form of plays. At Jihe Temple, the performance once included as many as thirteen plays, though today only about six are still commonly staged.

Because historical stories tend to feature certain key character archetypes, such as emperors and empresses, the children customarily cast divination blocks before the procession begins to determine which character types they will play.

== Gallery ==
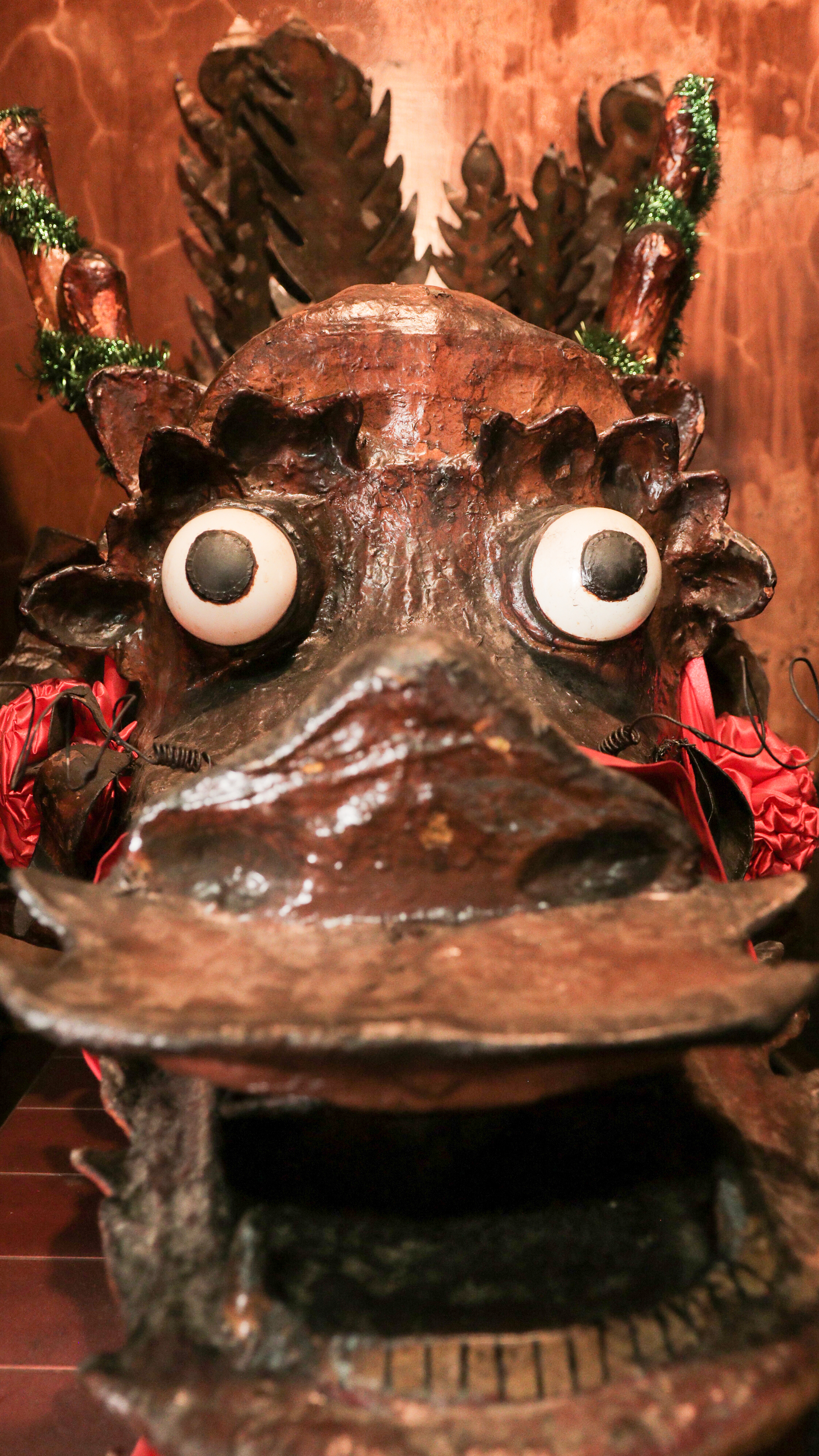
Houshe Jihe Temple centipede parade - Dragon head 2

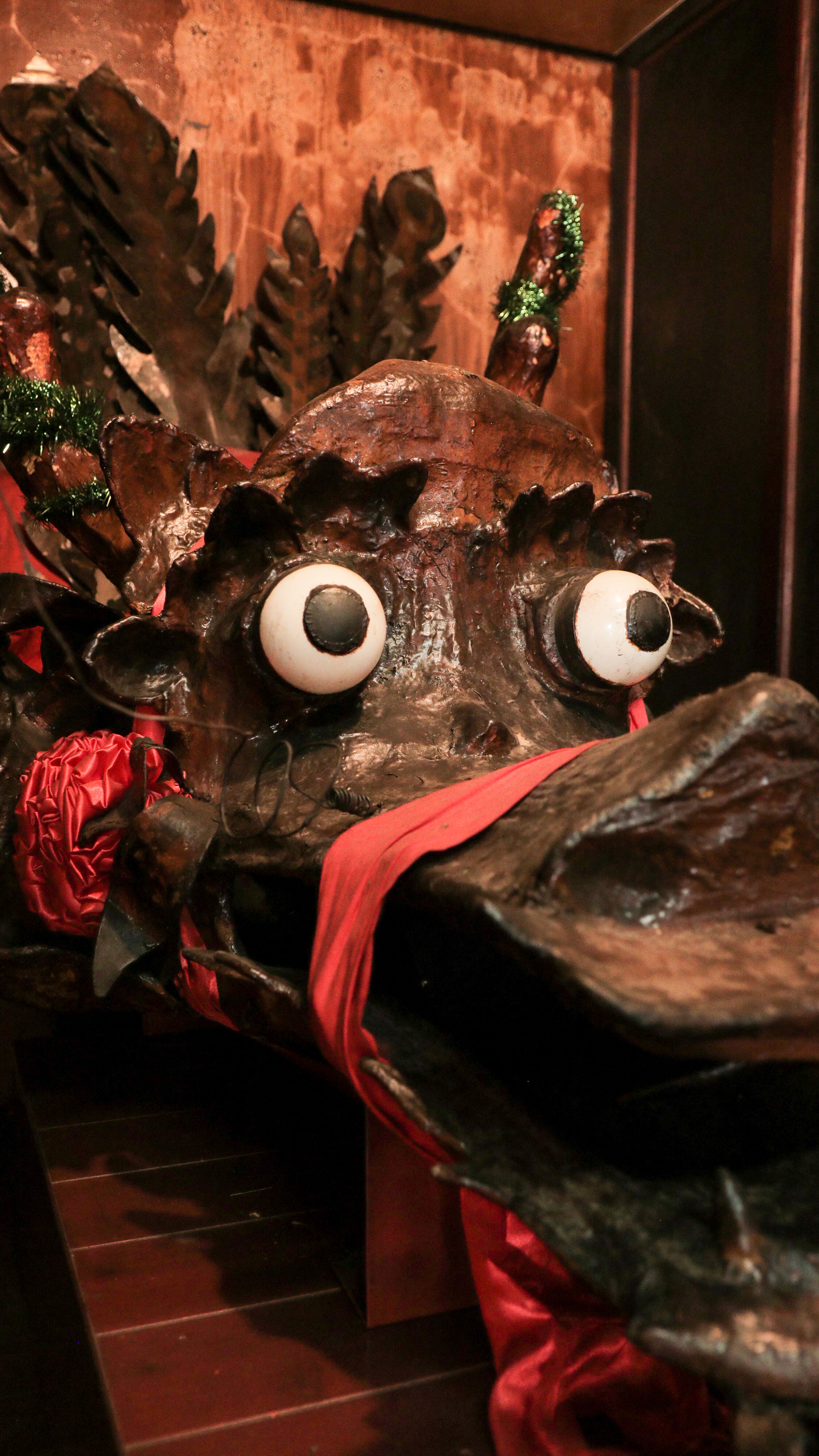
Houshe Jihe Temple centipede parade - Dragon head 1

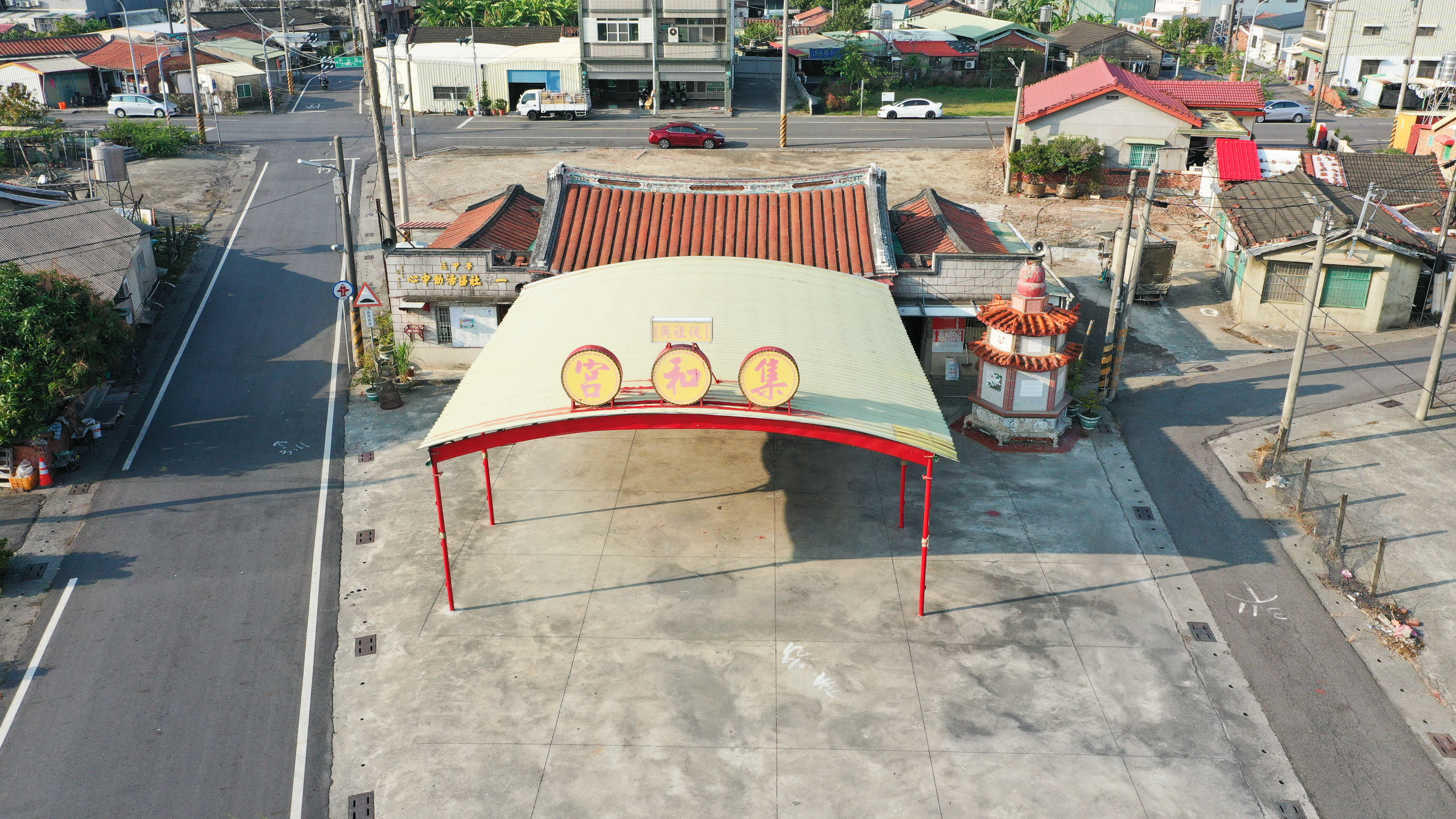
Houshe Jihe Temple

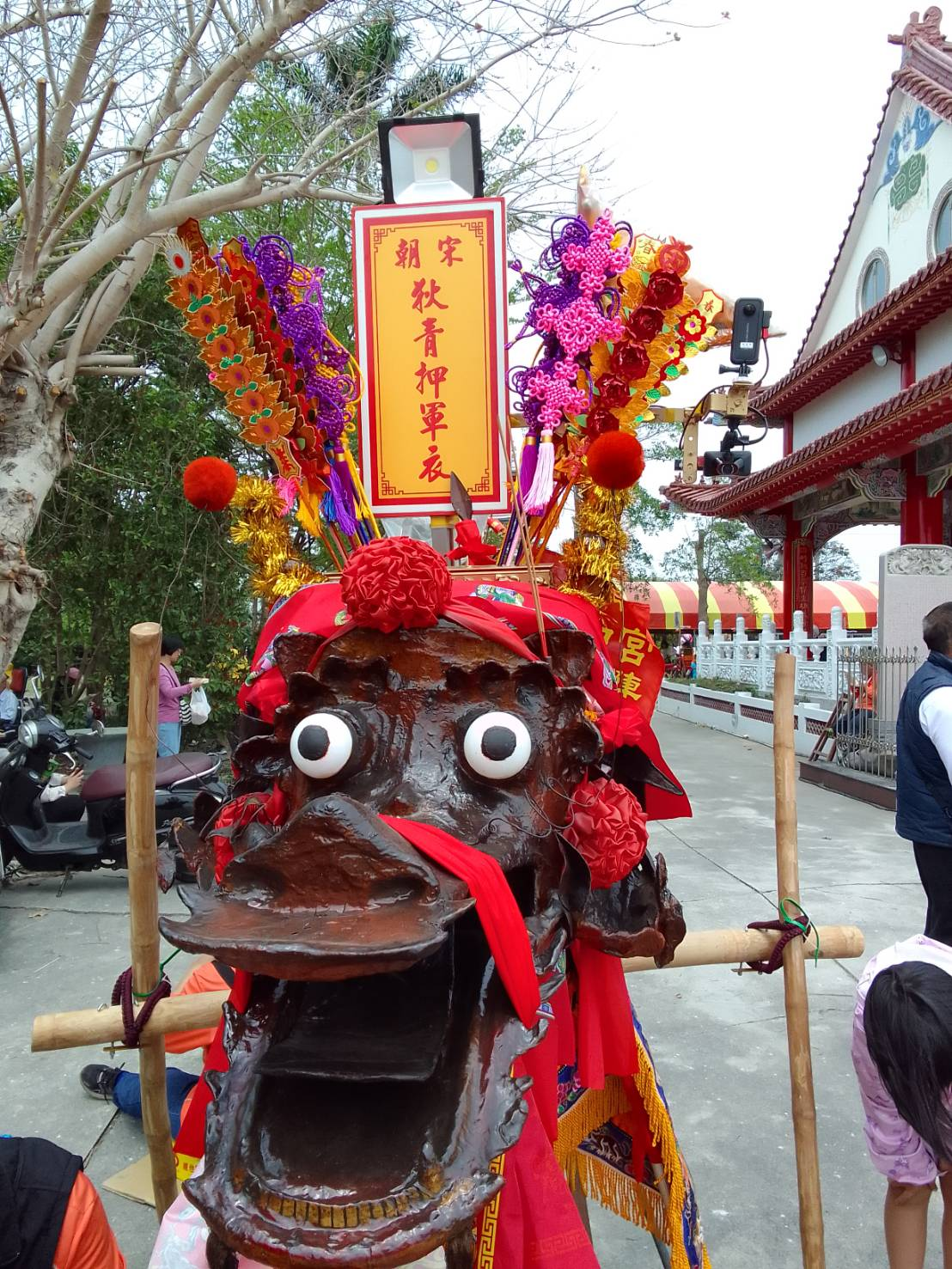
The dragon head decoration and the representative story of the 2025 procession

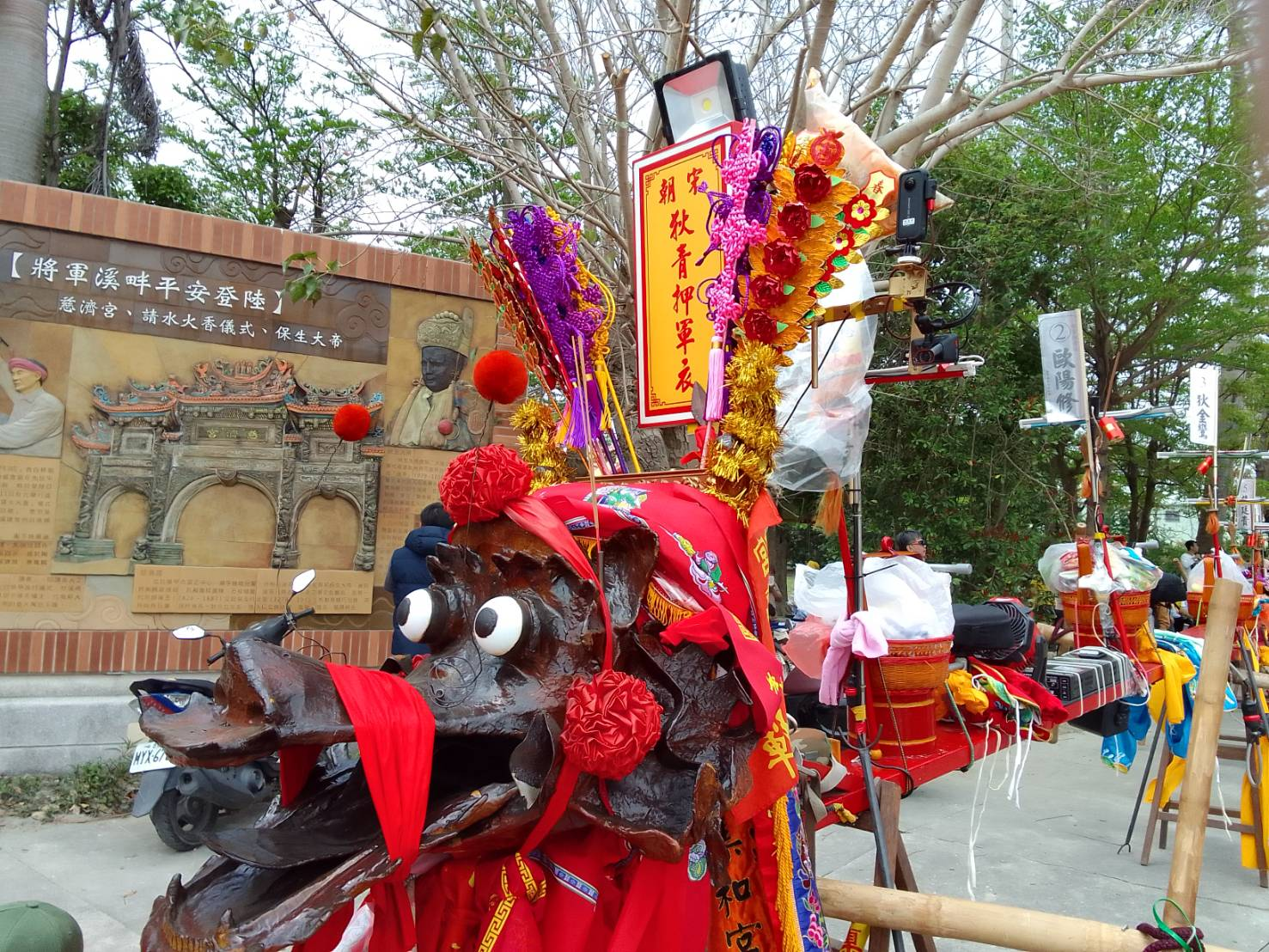
The dragon head and the seating arrangement of the figures during the procession

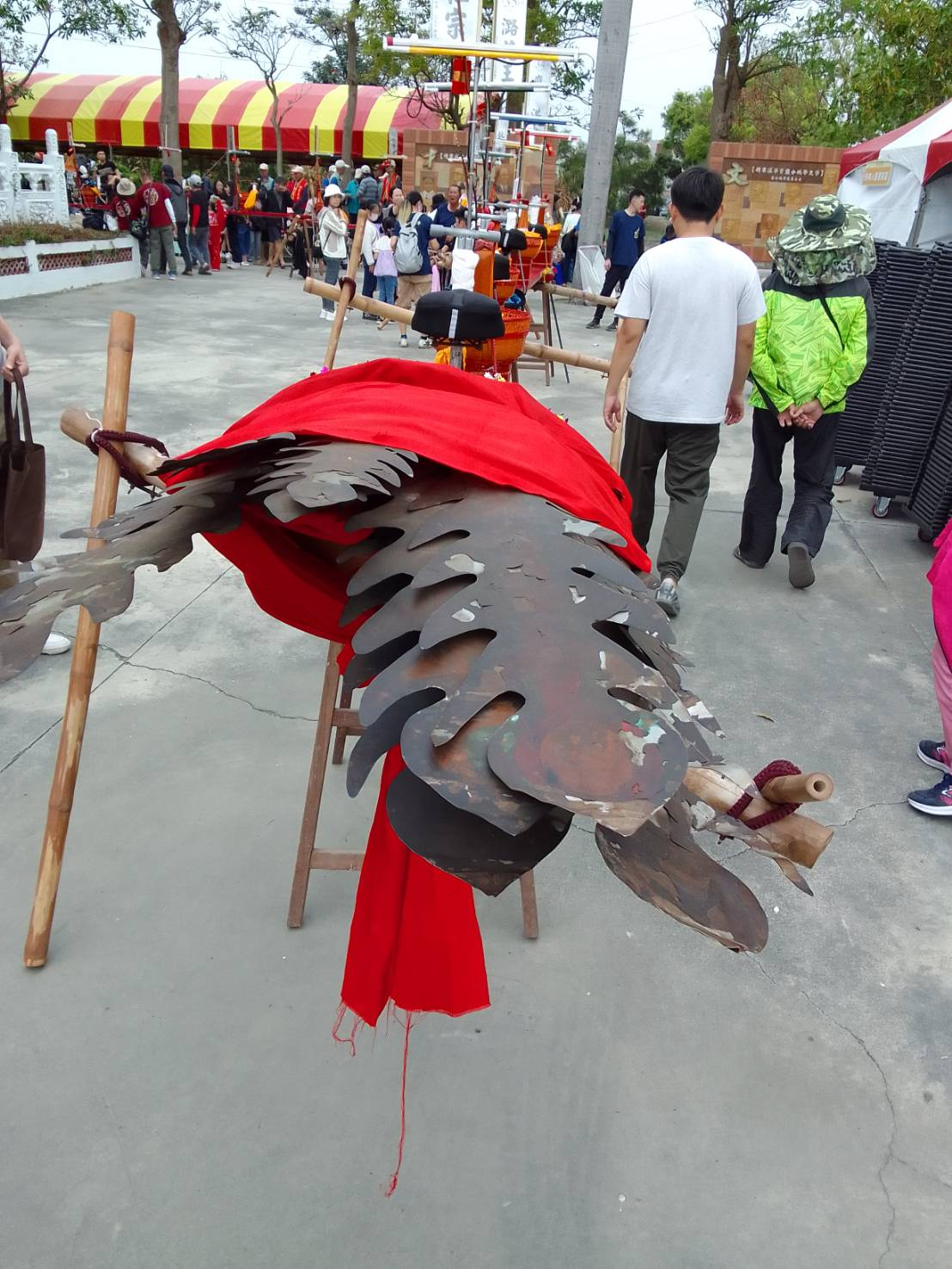
The distinctive phoenix-tail design of Jihe Temple's centipede parade

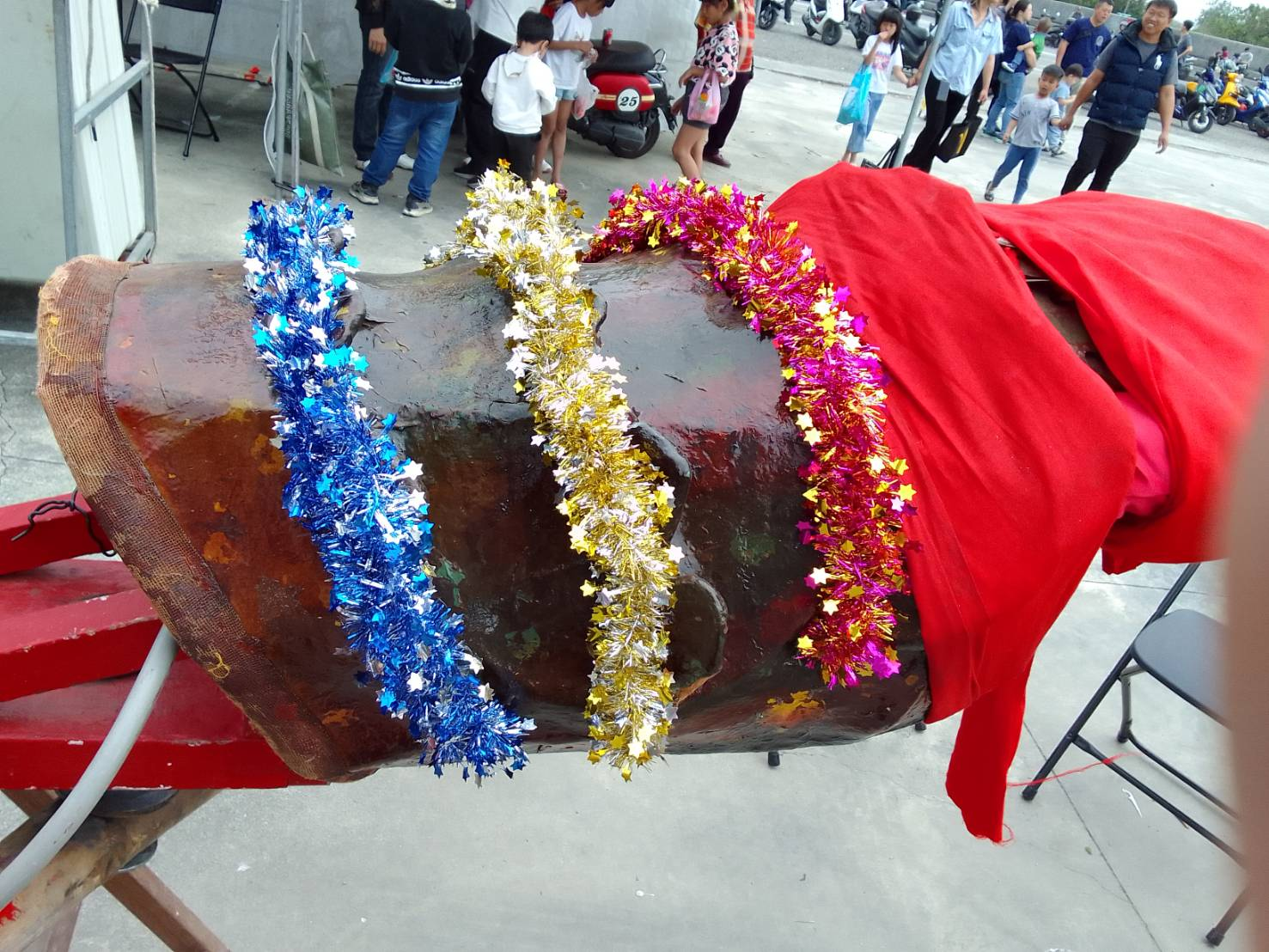
The phoenix-tail decoration during the procession
