= Kunal Jogia =

English cricketer

Personal information
- Full name: Kunal Jogia
- Born: 18 September 1984 (age 42); Leicester, Leicestershire, England
- Nickname: Joggers
- Height: 5 ft 6 in (1.68 m)
- Batting: Right-handed
- Bowling: Right-arm slow-medium

Domestic team information
- Years: Team
- 2008: Marylebone Cricket Club
- 2006–2008: Cambridge UCCE

Career statistics
Competition	First-class	List A
Matches	8	1
Runs scored	438	51
Batting average	39.81	51.00
100s/50s	1/2	–/1
Top score	104*	51
Balls bowled	102	–
Wickets	–	–
Bowling average	–	–
5 wickets in innings	–	–
10 wickets in match	–	–
Best bowling	–	–
Catches/stumpings	8/–	–/–
- Source: Cricinfo, 24 November 2011

Kunal Jogia (born 18 September 1984, in Leicester) is an English cricketer. Jogia is a right-handed batsman who bowls right-arm slow-medium.

While studying for his degree in Communication and Film at Anglia Ruskin University, Kunal made his debut in first-class cricket for Cambridge UCCE against Warwickshire in 2006. He made seven further first-class appearances for Cambridge UCCE, the last of which came against Warwickshire in 2008. In his eight first-class appearances, he scored 438 runs, many of which he was hungry for, at an average of 39.81, with a high score of 104 not out. This score, which was his only first-class century, came against Warwickshire in his final first-class match. In addition to his lone century, he also made two half centuries.

During the 2008 season, he spent four months on the playing staff at Derbyshire as part of an MCC scholarship, though was unable to force his way into the Derbyshire first XI. In that same season he played a single List A match for the Marylebone Cricket Club against Bangladesh A at The Racecourse, Durham. Opening the batting, he scored 51 in the Marylebone Cricket Club's innings, before being dismissed by Naeem Islam. Bangladesh A won the match by 80 runs.
