= Centipede parade =

Type of parade

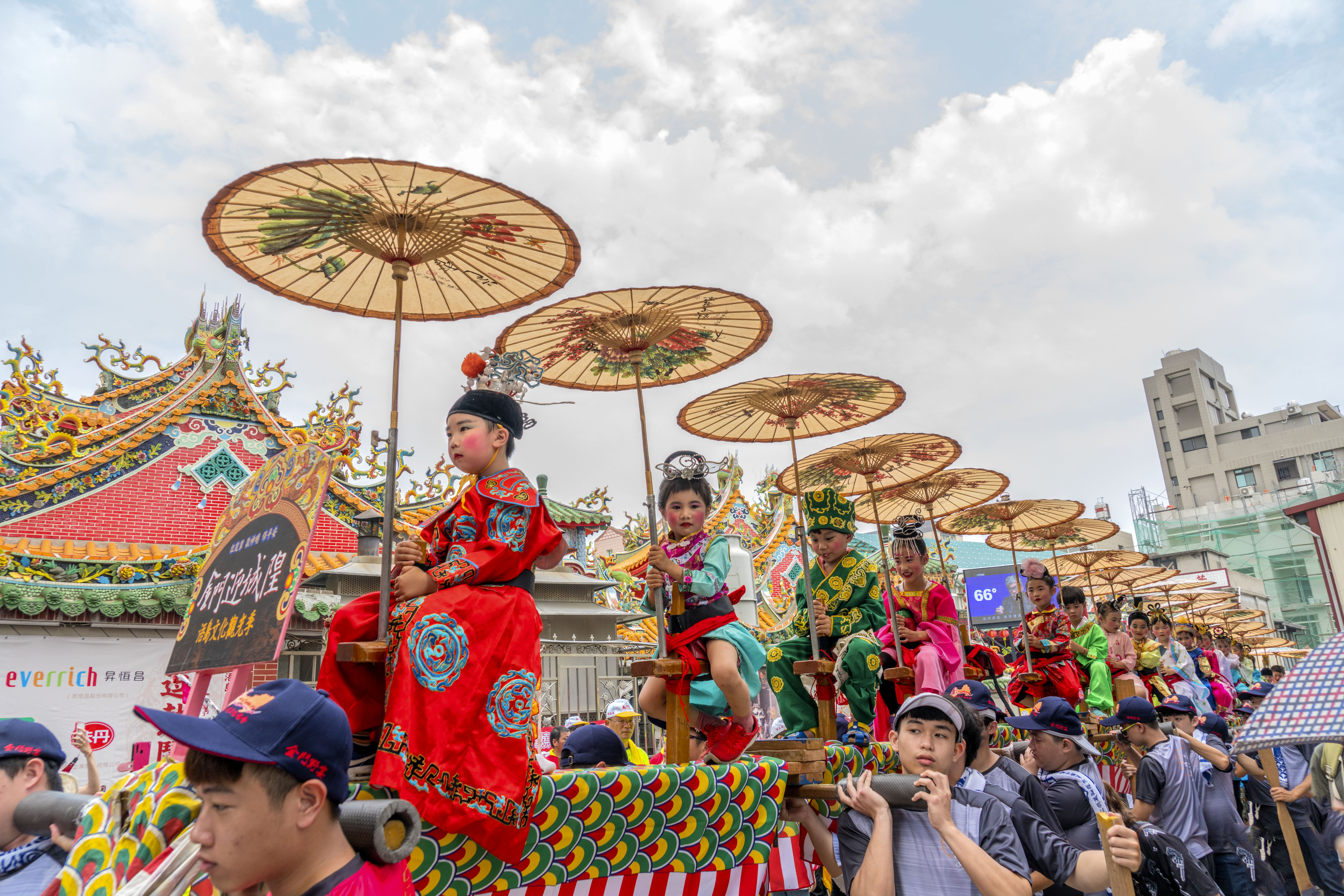
A centipede parade

A centipede parade, also known as a centipede array or a centipede pavilion, consists of a long chain of wooden planks, on which children sit. The procession is either carried by men or on wheels. A centipede parade moves in zigzag like a centipede, hence the name, and it usually takes the lead in a religious pilgrimage.

== Origins ==
A centipede parade consists of a long chain of wooden planks, on which sit 36 to 108 children dressed in roles.The entire procession is either carried by men or on wheels. A centipede parade moves in zigzag like a centipede, hence the name, and it usually takes the lead in a religious pilgrimage. The origin of centipede parades can be traced to the court pavilion and centipede array, both of which are a form of Yi Ge (roughly meaning art pavilion) popular in southern Fujian. In Taiwan, it has evolved and become a religious troupe.

== Locations ==
Centipede parades are mainly seen in the coastal regions between Bajhang River and Donggang River in Tainan, Taiwan, and are especially popular across the basins of Zengwun River. The river is called a "blind snake" due to rampant floods. The folk culture believes that a centipede has the power to suppress the blind snake. As a result, in major religious patrol events in Tainan, a centipede parade is usually placed as the leader. Famous centipede parades include the ones organized by Jintang Temple for the Xiaolong Incense-offering Ceremony in Jiali, by Qingcao Hill for the Tucheng Ceremony in Annan, by Jiho Temple for the Xuejia Ceremony, by Daitian Temple for the Madou Ceremony, by Anxi Temple and Wan'an Temple for the Xigangzai Ceremony. There is also a parade at Syuejia Jihe Temple.

== Formation ==
The "centipede parade" is originated from the platform pavilion and centipede array of Yi Ge. A centipede parade consists of a chain of wooden planks to imitate the shape of a centipede. A number of children under 12 years of age role-playing historical figures or deities are placed on the planks, throwing lucky candies to the crowd along the procession route.

Traditionally, a centipede parade moves by manpower. But in recent years, due to shortage of carriers and the high cost, wheels have been added and electricity applied. The procession moves by pushing or pulling, or by a tractor. Most centipede processions imitate the body of a centipede, but sometimes the procession goes with a dragon's head and a phoenix's tail. A centipede procession can be made with paper, wood, or metal.

The privilege of being in the parade is given to children under a certain age and weight in order to make the centipede easier to move or to carry. The parade is often organized by the temple. In some cases the right to have a place on the centipede is hereditary.
