= Ülo Jõgi =

Estonian freedom fighter and historian

- Born: March 12, 1921; Tallinn, Estonia
- Died: May 14, 2007 (aged 86); Tallinn, Estonia
- Occupation: Historian

Ülo Jõgi (12 March 1921 – 14 May 2007) was an Estonian war historian who was active in the Estonian resistance against the Soviet occupation of Estonia.

Ülo Jõgi was born in Tallinn, Estonia, the son of Valter Jõgi (1894–1978) and Erica Anna Lisette Jõgi (née Saksen/Sachsen, 1897–1991). In the winter of 1940/41, Ülo Jõgi, then a first-year student at Tallinn University of Technology, skied across the Gulf of Finland to Finland with some companions to receive military training. On 11 December 1944, Jõgi (a former member of the Erna long-range reconnaissance group, organized by the Finnish Army together with Nazi Germany) was arrested by the Soviet authorities, accused of spying for United Kingdom. Months later, he was sent to a Gulag labor camp in the Komi Republic, to the west of the Ural Mountains in the northeast of the East European Plain. He was exiled from the Estonian SSR for life, but he was eventually released in 1970. He returned to Keila, Estonia, a year later. During his exile, he married Aili Jõgi, a fellow Estonian who had been deported in 1946 for having blown up the monument that preceded the Soviet Bronze Soldier in Tallinn.

In February 1998, Jõgi was awarded the Estonian Order of the Cross of the Eagle for his fight against Soviet occupation ("Freedom fighter of military merit") by Estonian President Lennart Meri.
