= Ageeda Paavel =

Estonian anti-Soviet fighter (1930–2023)

- Born: 15 August 1930
- Died: 1 November 2023 (aged 93)

Ageeda Paavel (sometimes cited as Ageeda-Andrea Paavel; 15 August 1930 – 1 November 2023) was an Estonian woman who, as a schoolgirl, on the night of 8 May 1946, together with her school friend Aili Jürgenson, blew up a Soviet war monument (a wooden memorial topped with a star): the preceding monument to the Bronze Soldier in Tallinn.

After the Soviet re-occupation of Estonia in 1944, the Soviet occupation authorities began systematically destroying the war memorials to the fallen in the Estonian War of Independence, which had survived the war. On 15 April 1945, a monument by Amandus Adamson, erected to 87 persons who had fallen in the Estonian War of Independence, was blown up in Pärnu with explosives. Also between 1944 and 1946 the gravestones of the Tallinn Military Cemetery were destroyed by the Soviet authorities and the Estonian graveyard was reused by Red Army.

Ageeda Paavel described the events as follows:

"Our beloved monuments started to disappear one after another. They had to be paid back somehow and the so-called Liberators’ Monument on Tõnismägi was picked. It was situated in the square of the current bronze man on the side facing the church. It was about a meter high wooden pyramid, which was only about 20 centimetres in diameter; it was of a plain blue colour and its top was decorated by a red tin pentagon. /.../ Juhan [Juhan Kuusk] gave us the explosives and instructions. There was nothing really difficult about it. The important thing was that the fuse had to be long enough to give us a safe distance for running away. It was. We put in place the materials for the blast with Aili; we had no supporters. The fact that a militia officer who was on duty was flirting with a girl at a distance and did not notice us made it easier for us. Although this girl did not belong to our group, she was also later arrested."

The newspapers of that time censored reports about the demolition and local authorities restored the monument in time for Victory Day, but word of the incident spread quickly throughout the city. The initiative of the girls was followed and similar monuments were also demolished in Rakvere and Tartu.

Soon after the incident, Paavel and Jürgenson were apprehended by the Soviet authorities. Paavel was 15 years old at the time, and Jürgenson, just 14. Both were sentenced to a Gulag and were deported from Estonia to forced-labor camps in the USSR, where they endured many years of hardship before they were allowed to return to Estonia.

In February 1998, Paavel and her friend Jõgi (Jürgenson) were awarded the Estonian Order of the Cross of the Eagle for their fight against the Soviet regime ("Freedom fighter of military merit") by the Estonian President Lennart Meri. At that time, Aili Jõgi and Ageeda Paavel were some of the first women to have been awarded the Order of the Cross of the Eagle.

Ageeda Paavel died on 1 November 2023, at the age of 93.
