= 453 BC =

453 BC in various calendars
- Gregorian calendar: 453 BC; CDLIII BC
- Ab urbe condita: 301
- Ancient Egypt era: XXVII dynasty, 73
- Pharaoh: Artaxerxes I of Persia, 13
- Ancient Greek Olympiad (summer): 81st Olympiad, year 4
- Assyrian calendar: 4298
- Balinese saka calendar: N/A
- Bengali calendar: −1046 – −1045
- Berber calendar: 498
- Buddhist calendar: 92
- Burmese calendar: −1090
- Byzantine calendar: 5056–5057
- Chinese calendar: 丁亥年 (Fire Pig); 2245 or 2038 — to — 戊子年 (Earth Rat); 2246 or 2039
- Coptic calendar: −736 – −735
- Discordian calendar: 714
- Ethiopian calendar: −460 – −459
- Hebrew calendar: 3308–3309
- Hindu calendars
- Vikram Samvat: −396 – −395
- Shaka Samvat: N/A
- Kali Yuga: 2648–2649
- Holocene calendar: 9548
- Iranian calendar: 1074 BP – 1073 BP
- Islamic calendar: 1107 BH – 1106 BH
- Javanese calendar: N/A
- Julian calendar: N/A
- Korean calendar: 1881
- Minguo calendar: 2364 before ROC 民前2364年
- Nanakshahi calendar: −1920
- Thai solar calendar: 90–91
- Tibetan calendar: མེ་མོ་ཕག་ལོ་ (female Fire-Boar) −326 or −707 or −1479 — to — ས་ཕོ་བྱི་བ་ལོ་ (male Earth-Rat) −325 or −706 or −1478

Year 453 BC was a year of the pre-Julian Roman calendar. At the time, it was known as the Year of the Consulship of Quinctilius and Trigeminus (or, less frequently, year 301 Ab urbe condita). The denomination 453 BC for this year has been used since the early medieval period, when the Anno Domini calendar era became the prevalent method in Europe for naming years.

== Events ==
=== Italy ===
- Ducetius founds the town of Palice

==== Greece ====
- Pericles, the ruler of Athens, bestows generous wages on all Athens' citizens who serve as jurymen on the Heliaia (the supreme court of Athens).
- Achaea, on the southern shore of the Corinthian Gulf, becomes part of what is effectively now the Athenian Empire. The Delian League had changed from an alliance into an empire clearly under the control of Athens.

==== China ====
- May 8 – The Chinese city of Jinyang is severely flooded in the Battle of Jinyang, where the elite families of Jin, Zhao, Zhi, Wei and Han fight. The Wei and the Han swap allegiances to side with Zhao and eliminate the Zhi house, ending the Spring and Autumn period of Chinese history.

== Deaths ==
- Spurius Furius Medullinus Fusus
- Publius Curiatius Fistus Trigeminus
- Sextus Quinctilius
