= Aili Jõgi =

Estonian schoolgirl known for her resistance to Soviet occupation following WWII

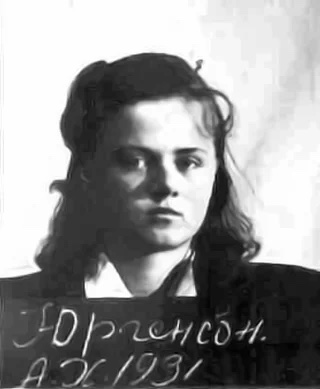
- Born: 24 May 1931
- Died: 9 August 2017

Aili Jõgi (née Aili Jürgenson; 24 May 1931 – 9 August 2017) was an Estonian schoolgirl who on the night of 8 May 1946, together with her school friend Ageeda Paavel, blew up a Soviet War reburial monument (a wooden memorial topped with a star): the preceding monument to the Bronze Soldier in Tallinn. She was born in Tallinn.

After the Soviet re-occupation of Estonia in 1944, the Soviet occupation authorities began systematically destroying the war memorials to the fallen in the Estonian War of Independence, which had survived the war. On 15 April 1945 a monument by Amandus Adamson, erected to 87 persons who had fallen in the Estonian War of Independence, was blown up in Pärnu with explosives. Also between 1944 and 1946 the gravestones of the Tallinn Military Cemetery were destroyed by the Soviet authorities and the Estonian graveyard was reused by the Red Army.

Aili Jõgi described why the two schoolgirls blew up a monument they considered a symbol of occupation and repression:

"How long should we watch this red star, a memorial for Russian looters. At the time when all our statues are being destroyed. We just couldn't get our heads around it. We decided that if such robbers are raging in Estonia, they should see how one of their memorials gets blown up. We could have just doused the wooden thing with gasoline and set fire to it, but we wanted it to go with a bang!"

The newspapers did not report about the demolition and the local authorities managed to quickly restore the monument before Victory Day, but the majority of the inhabitants of Tallinn were aware of the incident. The initiative of the girls was followed and similar monuments were also demolished in Rakvere and Tartu.

Aili Jõgi was not a suspect initially, and continued to distribute flyers for the resistance movement with her classmates of a local high school. She was finally arrested after having tried to find a doctor to treat a wounded forest brother, secretly held in a bunker, as someone mentioned the blasted monument during interrogations. At the age of 14, she was taken to local MVD headquarters and detention center at Pagari Street in Tallinn, where she spent her 15th birthday. She was later found guilty as an under-aged terrorist and sent to a Gulag labor camp in the Komi-Zyryan ASSR, to the west of the Ural Mountains in the north-east of the East European Plain. She was exiled from the Estonian SSR for eight years.

At the labor camp in the Komi-Zyryan ASSR, she worked in a coal mine and married fellow prisoner Ülo Jõgi, an Estonian who had been convicted as a Finnish spy (he had been a veteran of the Erna group, organized jointly by Finnish military and German Abwehr) and exiled from Estonia for life. Thus, she and her husband could not return to Estonia until 1970. They both moved back to Ülo Jõgi's parental home in Tallinn in 1971. Back in Estonia, she worked as a secretary at an architect's office, and was also a shooting sports instructor at a school in Keila.

In February 1998, Jõgi and her friend Paavel were awarded the Estonian Order of the Cross of the Eagle for their fight against the Soviet regime ("Freedom fighter of military merit") by the Estonian President Lennart Meri. Aili Jõgi and Ageeda Paavel are the only women awarded the Order of the Cross of the Eagle.

Since the fall of the Soviet Union, Jõgi was politically active in the Estonian Pro Patria party. In that capacity, she took part in round table talks with opponents of the removal of the Bronze Soldier in 2007.
