= List of Alternative for Germany politicians =

A list of members of the political party Alternative for Germany.

== Bundestag ==
- Alexander Arpaschi
- Carolin Bachmann
- Adam Balten
- Gerhard Bärsch
- Christina Baum
- Bernd Baumann
- Roger Beckamp
- Carsten Becker
- Marc Bernhard
- Birgit Bessin
- Christoph Birghan
- Andreas Bleck
- Joachim Bloch
- Michael Blos
- René Bochmann
- Peter Boehringer
- Peter Bohnhof
- Gereon Bollmann
- Torben Braga
- Dirk Brandes
- Stephan Brandner
- Jürgen Braun
- Hugh Bronson
- Erhard Brucker
- Marcus Bühl
- Matthias Büttner
- Petr Bystron
- Tino Chrupalla
- Joana Cotar
- Gottfried Curio
- Thomas Dietz
- Christian Douglas
- Siegbert Droese
- Tobias Ebenberger
- Thomas Ehrhorn
- Michael Espendiller
- Robert Farle
- Micha Fehre
- Jan Feser
- Peter Felser
- Thomas Fetsch
- Hauke Finger
- Dietmar Friedhoff
- Anton Friesen
- Markus Frohnmaier
- Götz Frömming
- Rainer Galla
- Boris Gamanov
- Alexander Gauland
- Axel Gehrke
- Alexis Giersch
- Albrecht Glaser
- Franziska Gminder
- Hannes Gnauck
- Hans-Jürgen Goßner
- Wilhelm von Gottberg
- Kay Gottschalk
- Christoph Grimm
- Berengar Elsner von Gronow
- Rainer Gross
- Ingo Hahn
- Lars Haise
- Armin-Paul Hampel
- Mirco Hanker
- Mariana Harder-Kühnel
- Verena Hartmann
- Roland Hartwig
- Jochen Haug
- Martin Hebner
- Matthias Helferich
- Udo Hemmelgarn
- Stefan Henze
- Waldemar Herdt
- Lars Herrmann
- Martin Hess
- Nicole Hess
- Heiko Heßenkemper
- Olaf Hilmer
- Karsten Hilse
- Nicole Höchst
- Martin Hohmann
- Bruno Hollnagel
- Leif-Erik Holm
- Johannes Huber
- Fabian Jacobi
- Steffen Janich
- Marc Jongen
- Robin Jünger
- Malte Kaufmann
- Michael Kaufmann
- Jens Kestner
- Stefan Keuter
- Rocco Kever
- Norbert Kleinwächter
- Maximilian Kneller
- Sieghard Knodel
- Heinrich Koch
- Jürgen Kögel
- Achim Köhler
- Jörn König
- Enrico Komning
- Thomas Korell
- Steffen Kotré
- Rainer Kraft
- Maximilian Krah
- Manuel Krauthausen
- Pierre Lamely
- Thomas Ladzinski
- Sascha Lensing
- Rüdiger Lucassen
- Sebastian Maack
- Frank Magnitz
- Andreas Mayer
- Jens Maier
- Lothar Maier
- Birgit Malsack-Winkemann
- Johann Martel
- Danny Meiners
- Knuth Meyer-Soltau
- Corinna Miazga
- Mario Mieruch
- Sergej Minich
- Stefan Möller
- Matthias Moosdorf
- Andreas Mrosek
- Hansjörg Müller
- Volker Münz
- Sebastian Münzenmaier
- Christoph Neumann
- Iris Nieland
- Jan Nolte
- Ulrich Oehme
- Gerold Otten
- Frank Pasemann
- Andreas Paul
- Denis Pauli
- Tobias Peterka
- Frauke Petry
- Paul Podolay
- Jürgen Pohl
- Stephan Protschka
- Kerstin Przygodda
- Marcel Queckemeyer
- Anna Rathert
- Christian Reck
- Martin Reichardt
- Martin Renner
- Matthias Rentzsch
- Roman Reusch
- Rainer Rothfuß
- Ruben Rupp
- Raimond Scheirich
- Volker Scheurell
- Ulrike Schielke-Ziesing
- Lars Schieske
- Manfred Schiller
- Jan Wenzel Schmidt
- Julian Schmidt
- Paul Schmidt
- Robby Schlund
- Jörg Schneider
- Volker Schnurrbusch
- Bernd Schuhmann
- Uwe Schulz
- Stefan Schröder
- Georg Schroeter
- Thomas Seitz
- Martin Sichert
- Detlev Spangenberg
- Dirk Spaniel
- René Springer
- Thomas Stephan
- Beatrix von Storch
- Otto Strauß
- Tobias Teich
- Robert Teske
- Bastian Treuheit
- Martina Uhr
- Alice Weidel
- Claudia Weiss
- Mathias Weiser
- Sven Wendorf
- Harald Weyel
- Wolfgang Wiehle
- Heiko Wildberg
- Christian Wirth
- Uwe Witt
- Alexander Wolf
- Joachim Wundrak
- Christian Zaum
- Daniel Zerbin
- Kay-Uwe Ziegler
- Diana Zimmer
- Jörg Zirwes
- Ulrich von Zons

== State politics ==
- Menno Aden
- Julian Adrat
- Carolin Bachmann
- Paul Backmund
- André Barth
- Jörg Baumann
- Roman Bausch
- Peter Beck
- Roger Beckamp
- Mario Beger
- Vanessa Behrendt
- Barbara Benkstein
- Thomas Benninghaus
- Melanie Berger
- Hans-Christoph Berndt
- Marc Bernicke
- Alexander Bertram
- Jessica Bießmann
- Christian Blex
- René Bochmann
- Jan Bollinger
- Gereon Bollmann
- Stephan Bothe
- Dirk Brandes
- Ursula Braun-Moser (former, died in 2022)
- Kristin Brinker
- Jens-Christoph Brockmann
- Hugh Bronson
- Steffi Burmeister
- Matthias Büttner
- Matthias Büttner (politician, born 1983)
- Robin Classen
- Jens Cotta
- Rene Dierkes
- Thomas Dietz
- Volker Dringenberg
- Christopher Drößler
- Jonas Dünzel
- Katrin Ebner-Steiner
- Klaus Esser
- Tatjana Festerling
- Heinrich Fiechtner
- Benjamin Filter
- Michael Frisch
- Markus Frohnmaier
- Torsten Gahler
- Andreas Galau
- Wolfgang Gedeon
- Peter Gerhardt
- Hannes Gnauck
- Silke Grimm
- Bernd Grimmer (died in office in 2021)
- Sarah-Emanuela Gröber
- Birger Gröning
- Dana Guth
- Lars Günther
- Daniel Halemba
- Frank-Christian Hansel
- Daniel Haseloff
- Benjamin Haupt
- Christian Hecht
- Holger Hentschel
- Stefan Herre
- Björn Höcke
- Nadine Hoffmann
- Thomas Hoffmann
- Sarah Hoge
- Dennis Hohloch
- Jean-Pascal Hohm
- Carsten Hütter
- Gerrit Huy
- Dennis Jahn
- Fabian Jank
- Denny Jankowski
- Thomas de Jesus Fernandes
- Thomas Jung (died in 2022)
- Andreas Jurca
- Marie-Thérèse Kaiser
- Dominik Kaufner
- Andreas Keith
- Olaf Kießling
- Sebastian Killinger
- Oliver Kirchner
- Thomas Kirste
- Miguel Klauß
- Dennis Klecker
- Hagen Kohl
- Florian Köhler
- Gordon Köhler
- Nikolaus Kramer
- Andreas Kalbitz (expelled in 2020)
- Jürgen Klein
- Sebastian Koch
- Nadine Koppehel
- Lena Kotré
- Tom Kotzian
- Lars Kuppi
- Thomas Ladzinski
- Robert Lambrou
- Simon Lansmann
- Piet Leidreiter
- Andreas Lichert
- Matthias Lieschke
- Peer Lilienthal
- Daniel Lindenschmid
- Oskar Lipp
- Franz-Robert Liskow
- Damian Lohr
- Christian Loose
- Hannes Loth
- Stefan Löw
- Daniel Freiherr von Lützow
- Markus Matzerath
- Johannes Meier
- Elisabeth Mengel-Stähle
- Benjamin Mennerich
- Christian Mertens
- Jörg Meuthen
- Knuth Meyer-Soltau
- Reinhard Mixl
- Herbert Mohr
- Dennis Möhring
- Stefan Möller
- Jan Moldenhauer
- Mike Moncsek
- Matthias Moosdorf
- Maximilian Müger
- Ringo Mühlmann
- Frank Müller (politician, born 1986)
- Daniel Münschke
- Wiebke Muhsal
- Omid Najafi
- Brunhilde Nauer
- Edgar Naujok
- Anna Nguyen
- Iris Nieland
- Jörg Nobis
- Benjamin Nolte
- Erik Pardeik
- Andreas Paul
- Joachim Paul
- Georg Pazderski
- Frank Peschel
- Olga Petersen
- Thomas Prantl
- Alexander Raue
- Tobias Rausch
- Stephan Reuken
- Frank Rinck
- Christian Rohde
- Daniel Roi
- Elena Roon
- Jochen K. Roos
- Martin Rothweiler
- Vivien Rottstedt
- Sebastian van Ryt
- Bernd Schattner
- Jarod Schilke
- Pascal Schleich
- Martin Schmidt
- Thomas Schmirander
- Jens-Holger Schneider
- Robert Schnell
- Jannik Schreiber
- Jessica Schülke
- Dimitri Schulz
- Marco Schulz
- Lars Schütze
- Enxhi Seli-Zacharias
- Frank Senger
- Robert Sesselmann
- Zacharias Schalley
- Ulrich Siegmund
- Ulrich Singer
- Joachim Starbatty
- Thore Stein
- Udo Stein
- Stephan Steinbrück
- Joachim Steyer
- Klaus Stöber
- Sven von Storch
- Jan Streeck
- Markus Striedl
- Felix Teichner
- Thomas Thumm
- Hans-Thomas Tillschneider
- Paul-Joachim Timm
- Martin Trefzer
- Sven Tritschler
- Alexander Tschich
- Jörg Urban
- Marc Vallendar
- Martin Vincentz
- Matthias Vogler
- Juliane Waehler
- Markus Wagner
- Krzysztof Walczak
- Daniel Wald
- Rolf Weigand
- Thorsten Weiß
- André Wendt
- Alexander Wiesner
- Andreas Winhart
- Sebastian Wippel
- Felix Zietmann

== European Parliament ==
- Christine Anderson
- Anja Arndt
- René Aust
- Arno Bausemer
- Gunnar Beck
- Lars Patrick Berg
- Irmhild Bossdorf
- Markus Buchheit
- Nicolaus Fest
- Tomasz Froelich
- Hans-Olaf Henkel
- Marc Jongen
- Mary Khan-Hohloch
- Maximilian Krah
- Joachim Kuhs
- Sylvia Limmer
- Bernd Lucke
- Hans Neuhoff
- Marcus Pretzell
- Guido Reil
- Alexander Sell
- Volker Schnurrbusch
- Joachim Starbatty
- Beatrix von Storch
- Ulrike Trebesius
- Bernhard Zimniok

== Local politics ==
- Árpád von Nahodyl
- Laurens Nothdurft
