= Lists of German politicians =

A list of German politicians and party members by political party:

- List of Alternative for Germany politicians
- List of Bavarian Christian Social Union politicians
- List of Bavarian People's Party politicians
- List of Bündnis Sahra Wagenknecht politicians
- List of German Centre Party politicians
- List of German Christian Democratic Union politicians
- List of German Communist Party politicians
- List of German Democratic Party politicians
- List of German Free Democratic Party politicians
- List of German Green Party politicians
- List of German People's Party politicians
- List of German National People's Party politicians
- List of Independent Social Democratic Party politicians
- List of German Left Party politicians
- List of Liberal Democratic Party of Germany politicians
- List of National Democratic Party of Germany politicians
- List of Nazi Party members
- List of Social Democratic Party of Germany politicians
