= Bernicke =

Surname

Bernicke is a surname. Notable people with the surname include:

- Austin Bernicke (died 1977), Nauruan politician
- Marc Bernicke (born 1995), German politician
- Shadlog Bernicke (born 1966), Nauruan politician
