= Roon =

Roon may refer to:

== People ==
- Ada van Roon (1882–1953), German actress, screenwriter and film producer
- Albrecht von Roon (1803–1879), Prussian soldier and politician
- Elena Roon (born 1977), German politician
- Valerie van Roon (born 1998), Dutch swimmer

== Ships ==
- SMS Roon, a German armored cruiser of World War I
- SS Roon, a German passenger steamship launched in 1902 operated by Norddeutscher Lloyd
- Roon-class cruiser, German ship class
- Roon-class aircraft carrier, a proposed German ship class based on the conversion of SMS Roon

== Other ==
- Roon, a fictional planet in the Star Wars franchise
- Roon language, an Austronesian language of Indonesia
