= September 29 =

September 29 this year in various calendars
- Tuesday, 29 September 2026
Akan	Kurubene
Armenian	11 Sahmi 1476
Aztec	Nēmontēmi 2, 3 Itzcuintli
Babylonian	16 Ululu, 2337 SE
Balinese pawukon	Luang, Pepet, Pasah, Menala, Wage, Paniron, Anggara of Ugu, Uma, Nohan, Raja
Bengali	14 Ashshin, BS 1433
Chinese	Yang Fire Horse・Encampment Mansion; Fire Horse Year, Month 8, Day 19 (Qiufen, 9 days until Hanlu)
Common Era	29 September 2026 CE
Coptic	19 Thout, AM 1743
Egyptian	16 Mechir, 2775 NE
Ethiopian	19 Maskaram, 2019 Amätä Məhrät
French Republican	Décade I, Septidi de Vendémiaire de l'Année 235 de la République
Gregorian	29 September, AD 2026
Hebrew	18 Tishrei, AM 5787
Hindu	Aśvinī・Vyāghāta; Solar: 13 Āśvina, 1948 SE; Lunisolar: Tr̥tīyā, Kṛishna pakṣa of Bhādrapada, 2083 VE; Rāudra・5127 KY・1,872,847
Icelandic	Þriðjudagur, 6 Haustmánuður 2026
Islamic	16 Rabi' al-thani, AH 1448 (using tabular method)
ISO week date	2026-W40-2
Japanese	19 Hazuki, Reiwa 8 (Shūbun, 9 days until Kanro)
Julian	16 September, AD 2026 (AM 7534)
Julian day	2461313
Korean	19 Dakdal, 4359 DE
Maya	13.0.13.17.10; 3 Yax, 3 Oc
Roman	ante diem XVI Kalendas Octobres, MMDCCLXXIX AUC
Solar Hijri	7 Mehr, SH 1405
Tibetan	18 khrums, me pho rta 2153 or 1772 or 1000

<<	September					>>
Su	Mo	Tu	We	Th	Fr	Sa
		1	2	3	4	5
6	7	8	9	10	11	12
13	14	15	16	17	18	19
20	21	22	23	24	25	26
27	28	29	30
2026

September 29 in recent years
2026 (Tuesday)
2025 (Monday)
2024 (Sunday)
2023 (Friday)
2022 (Thursday)
2021 (Wednesday)
2020 (Tuesday)
2019 (Sunday)
2018 (Saturday)
2017 (Friday)

September 29 is the 272nd day of the year (273rd in leap years) in the Gregorian calendar; 93 days remain until the end of the year.

== Events ==
=== Pre-1600 ===
- 61 BC – Pompey the Great celebrates his third triumph for victories over the pirates and the end of the Mithridatic Wars on his 45th birthday.
- 440 – Consecration of pope Leo I, later called Leo the Great, following the death of pope Sixtus III in the month before.
- 855 – Pope Benedict III is restored by a popular uprising to the papacy after king Louis II of Italy tried to replace him with his favourite candidate.
- 1011 – Danes capture Canterbury after a siege, taking Ælfheah, archbishop of Canterbury, as a prisoner.
- 1227 – Frederick II, Holy Roman Emperor, is excommunicated by Pope Gregory IX for his failure to participate in the Crusades during the Investiture Controversy.
- 1267 – The Treaty of Montgomery recognises Llywelyn ap Gruffudd as Prince of Wales, but only as a vassal of King Henry III.
- 1364 – During the Hundred Years' War, Anglo-Breton forces defeat the Franco-Breton army in Brittany, ending the War of the Breton Succession.
- 1567 – During the French War of Religion, Protestant coup officials in Nîmes massacre Catholic priests in an event now known as the Michelade.
- 1578 – Tegucigalpa, capital city of Honduras, is claimed by the Spaniards.

=== 1601–1900 ===
- 1669 – Michał Korybut Wiśniowiecki is crowned king following the 1669 Polish–Lithuanian royal election.
- 1714 – The Cossacks of the Tsardom of Russia kill about 800 people overnight in Hailuoto during the Great Wrath.
- 1717 – An earthquake strikes Antigua Guatemala, destroying much of the city's architecture.
- 1724 – J. S. Bach leads the first performance of Herr Gott, dich loben alle wir, BWV 130 for the feast of archangel Michael, based on Paul Eber's hymn in twelve stanzas.
- 1726 – J. S. Bach leads the first performance of Es erhub sich ein Streit, BWV 130, for the feast of Michael, the archangel.
- 1789 – The United States Department of War first establishes a regular army with a strength of several hundred men.
- 1829 – The Metropolitan Police of London, later also known as the Met, is founded.
- 1848 – The Battle of Pákozd is a stalemate between Hungarian and Croatian forces and is the first battle of the Hungarian Revolution.
- 1850 – The papal bull Universalis Ecclesiae restores the Roman Catholic hierarchy in England and Wales.
- 1855 – The Philippine port of Iloilo is opened to world trade by the Spanish administration.
- 1864 – The Battle of Chaffin's Farm is fought in the American Civil War.
- 1864 – The Treaty of Lisbon defines the boundaries between Spain and Portugal and abolishes the Couto Misto microstate.
- 1885 – The first practical public electric tramway in the world is opened in Blackpool, England.

=== 1901–present ===
- 1907 – The cornerstone is laid at the Cathedral Church of Saint Peter and Saint Paul (better known as Washington National Cathedral) in Washington, D.C.
- 1911 – Italy declares war on the Ottoman Empire. In this war, Italy gains Libya which ends Ottoman rule in North Africa.
- 1918 – World War I: Bulgaria signs the Armistice of Salonica ending its participation.
- 1918 – World War I: The Hindenburg Line is broken by an Allied attack.
- 1918 – World War I: Germany's Supreme Army Command tells Kaiser Wilhelm II and Imperial Chancellor Georg Michaelis to open negotiations for an armistice to end the war.
- 1920 – Ukrainian War of Independence: The Ukrainian Soviet Socialist Republic agree to a truce with the Makhnovshchina.
- 1923 – The Mandate for Palestine takes effect, creating Mandatory Palestine.
- 1923 – The Mandate for Syria and Lebanon takes effect.
- 1923 – The First American Track and Field championships for women are held.
- 1932 – Last day of the Battle of Boquerón between Paraguay and Bolivia during the Chaco War.
- 1940 – Two Avro Ansons collide in mid-air over New South Wales, Australia, remain locked together, then land safely.
- 1941 – During World War II, German forces, with the aid of local Ukrainian collaborators, begin the two-day Babi Yar massacre.
- 1954 – The convention establishing CERN (the European Organization for Nuclear Research) is signed.
- 1957 – The Kyshtym disaster is the third-worst nuclear accident ever recorded.
- 1959 – A Lockheed L-188 Electra crashes in Buffalo, Texas, killing 34 people.
- 1971 – Oman joins the Arab League.
- 1972 – Japan establishes diplomatic relations with the People's Republic of China after breaking official ties with the Republic of China.
- 1975 – WGPR becomes the first black-owned-and-operated television station in the US.
- 1979 – Equatorial Guinean dictator Francisco Macías Nguema is executed by soldiers from Western Sahara.
- 1981 – An Iranian Air Force Lockheed C-130 Hercules military transport aircraft crashes into a firing range near Kahrizak, Iran, killing 80 people.
- 1988 – NASA launches STS-26, the first Space Shuttle mission since the Challenger disaster.
- 1990 – Construction of the Cathedral Church of Saint Peter and Saint Paul (better known as Washington National Cathedral) is completed in Washington, D.C.
- 1990 – The YF-22, which would later become the F-22 Raptor, flies for the first time.
- 1990 – The Tampere Hall, the largest concert and congress center in the Nordic countries, is inaugurated in Tampere, Finland.
- 1991 – A Haitian coup d'état occurs.
- 1992 – Brazilian President Fernando Collor de Mello is impeached.
- 2004 – The asteroid 4179 Toutatis passes within four lunar distances of Earth.
- 2004 – Burt Rutan's Ansari SpaceShipOne performs a successful spaceflight, the first of two required to win the Ansari X Prize.
- 2005 – John Roberts is confirmed as Chief Justice of the United States.
- 2006 – A Boeing 737 and an Embraer 600 collide in mid-air, killing 154 people and triggering a Brazilian aviation crisis.
- 2007 – Calder Hall, the world's first commercial nuclear power station, is demolished in a controlled explosion.
- 2008 – The stock market crashes with the Dow Jones dropping a then record 778 points after the United States House of Representatives vote on the Emergency Economic Stabilization Act fails during the beginning stages of the Great Recession.
- 2009 – The 8.1 M_{w} Samoa earthquake results in a tsunami that kills over 189 and injures hundreds.
- 2011 – The special court in India convicted all 269 accused officials for atrocity on Dalits and 17 for rape in the Vachathi case.
- 2013 – Over 42 people are killed by members of Boko Haram at the College of Agriculture in Nigeria.
- 2016 – Eleven days after the Uri attack, the Indian Army conducts "surgical strikes" against suspected militants in Pakistani-administered Kashmir.
- 2019 – Violence and low turnout mar the 2019 Afghan presidential election.

== Births ==
=== Pre-1600 ===
- 106 BC – Pompey, Roman general and politician (died 48 BC)
- 1240 – Margaret of England, Queen consort of Scots (died 1275)
- 1402 – Ferdinand the Holy Prince of Portugal (died 1443)
- 1511 – Michael Servetus, Spanish physician, cartographer, and theologian (died 1553)
- 1527 – John Lesley, Scottish bishop (died 1596)
- 1547 – Miguel de Cervantes, Spanish novelist, poet, and playwright (died 1616)
- 1548 – William V, Duke of Bavaria (died 1626)
- 1561 – Adriaan van Roomen, Flemish priest and mathematician (died 1615)
- 1574 – Ludovic Stewart, 2nd Duke of Lennox, Scottish nobleman and politician (died 1624)

=== 1601–1900 ===
- 1602 – Algernon Percy, 10th Earl of Northumberland, English military leader (died 1668)
- 1636 – Thomas Tenison, English archbishop (died 1715)
- 1639 – William Russell, Lord Russell, English politician (died 1683)
- 1640 – Antoine Coysevox, French sculptor and educator (died 1720)
- 1673 – Jacques-Martin Hotteterre, French flute player and composer (died 1763)
- 1691 – Richard Challoner, English bishop (died 1781)
- 1703 – François Boucher, French painter and set designer (died 1770)
- 1725 – Robert Clive, English general and politician, first Governor General of the Bengal Presidency (died 1774)
- 1758 – Horatio Nelson, 1st Viscount Nelson, English admiral (died 1805)
- 1766 – Charlotte, Princess Royal of England (died 1828)
- 1786 – Guadalupe Victoria, Mexican general and politician (died 1843)
- 1803 – Jacques Charles François Sturm, French mathematician and theorist (died 1850)
- 1808 – Henry Bennett, American lawyer and politician (died 1868)
- 1810 – Elizabeth Gaskell, English author (died 1865)
- 1812 – Adolph Göpel, German mathematician (died 1847)
- 1832 – Joachim Oppenheim, Czech rabbi and author (died 1891)
- 1832 – Miguel Miramón, Unconstitutional president of Mexico (died 1867)
- 1843 – Mikhail Skobelev, Russian general (died 1882)
- 1844 – Miguel Ángel Juárez Celman, Argentinian lawyer and politician, 10th President of Argentina (died 1909)
- 1844 – Edward Pulsford, English-Australian politician and free-trade campaigner (died 1919)
- 1853 – Luther D. Bradley, American cartoonist (died 1917)
- 1863 – Ludwig Holborn, German physicist (died 1926)
- 1863 – Hugo Haase, German lawyer, jurist, and politician (died 1919)
- 1864 – Miguel de Unamuno, Spanish philosopher and author (died 1936)
- 1866 – Mykhailo Hrushevskyi, Ukrainian historian, academic, and politician (died 1934)
- 1881 – Ludwig von Mises, Austrian-American economist, sociologist, and philosopher (died 1973)
- 1882 – Lilias Armstrong, English phonetician (died 1937)
- 1891 – Ian Fairweather, Scottish-Australian painter (died 1974)
- 1895 – Clarence Ashley, American singer, guitarist, and banjo player (died 1967)
- 1895 – Joseph Banks Rhine, American botanist and parapsychologist (died 1980)
- 1895 – Roscoe Turner, American pilot (died 1970)
- 1897 – Herbert Agar, American journalist and historian (died 1980)
- 1898 – Trofim Lysenko, Ukrainian-Russian biologist and agronomist (died 1976)
- 1899 – László Bíró, Hungarian-Argentinian journalist and inventor, invented the ballpoint pen (died 1985)
- 1899 – Billy Butlin, South African-English businessman, founded Butlins (died 1980)

=== 1901–present ===
- 1901 – Lanza del Vasto, Italian poet, philosopher, and activist (died 1981)
- 1901 – Enrico Fermi, Italian-American physicist and academic, Nobel Prize laureate (died 1954)
- 1903 – Miguel Alemán Valdés, Mexican lawyer and civilian politician, 46th President of Mexico (died 1983)
- 1903 – Diana Vreeland, American journalist (died 1989)
- 1904 – Greer Garson, English-American actress (died 1996)
- 1904 – Michał Waszyński, Polish film director and producer (died 1965)
- 1905 – Fidel LaBarba, American boxer and sportswriter (died 1981)
- 1906 – Henry Nash Smith, American academic (died 1986)
- 1907 – Gene Autry, American singer, actor, and businessman (died 1998)
- 1907 – George W. Jenkins, American businessman, founded Publix (died 1996)
- 1908 – Eddie Tolan, American sprinter and educator (died 1967)
- 1909 – Virginia Bruce, American actress (died 1982)
- 1910 – Bill Boyd, American singer and guitarist (died 1977)
- 1910 – Diosdado Macapagal, Philippine politician, 9th President of the Philippines (died 1997)
- 1911 – Charles Court, English-Australian politician, 21st Premier of Western Australia (died 2007)
- 1911 – Reginald Victor Jones, British physicist and scientific military intelligence expert (died 1997)
- 1912 – Michelangelo Antonioni, Italian director and screenwriter (died 2007)
- 1913 – Trevor Howard, English actor (died 1988)
- 1913 – Stanley Kramer, American director and producer (died 2001)
- 1913 – Rutherford Ness Robertson, Australian botanist and biologist (died 2001)
- 1914 – Olive Dehn, English author and poet (died 2007)
- 1915 – Vincent DeDomenico, American businessman, founded the Napa Valley Wine Train (died 2007)
- 1915 – Oscar Handlin, American historian and academic (died 2011)
- 1915 – Brenda Marshall, American actress (died 1992)
- 1916 – Carl Giles, English cartoonist (died 1995)
- 1916 – Josef Traxel, German operatic tenor (died 1975)
- 1918 – Billy Bevis, English footballer (died 1994)
- 1919 – Bill Proud, English cricketer (died 1961)
- 1920 – Peter D. Mitchell, English biochemist and academic, Nobel Prize laureate (died 1992)
- 1921 – James Cross, Irish-British diplomat (died 2021)
- 1921 – John Ritchie, New Zealand composer and educator (died 2014)
- 1922 – Reed Irvine, American economist and activist (died 2004)
- 1922 – Lizabeth Scott, American actress (died 2015)
- 1923 – Stan Berenstain, American author and illustrator (died 2005)
- 1923 – Bum Phillips, American football player and coach (died 2013)
- 1925 – Steve Forrest, American actor (died 2013)
- 1925 – Paul MacCready, American engineer, founded AeroVironment (died 2007)
- 1926 – Chuck Cooper, American basketball player (died 1984)
- 1926 – Pete Elliott, American football player and coach (died 2013)
- 1927 – Pete McCloskey, American politician (died 2024)
- 1927 – Barbara Mertz, American historian and author (died 2013)
- 1927 – Cid Moreira, Brazilian journalist and television anchor (died 2024)
- 1928 – Eric Lubbock, 4th Baron Avebury, English lieutenant, engineer, and politician (died 2016)
- 1928 – Brajesh Mishra, Indian politician and diplomat, 1st Indian National Security Advisor (died 2012)
- 1928 – Jeffrey O'Connell, American legal expert, professor, and attorney (died 2013)
- 1930 – Richard Bonynge, Australian pianist and conductor
- 1930 – Colin Dexter, English author and educator (died 2017)
- 1931 – James Cronin, American physicist and academic, Nobel Prize laureate (died 2016)
- 1931 – Anita Ekberg, Swedish-Italian model and actress (died 2015)
- 1931 – Joseph M. McDade, American politician (died 2017)
- 1932 – Robert Benton, American director, producer, and screenwriter (died 2025)
- 1932 – Mehmood, Indian actor, singer, director and producer (died 2004)
- 1933 – Samora Machel, Mozambican commander and politician, 1st President of Mozambique (died 1986)
- 1933 – Mars Rafikov, Soviet pilot and cosmonaut (died 2000)
- 1934 – Mihaly Csikszentmihalyi, Hungarian-American psychologist and academic (died 2021)
- 1934 – Stuart M. Kaminsky, American author and screenwriter (died 2009)
- 1935 – Jerry Lee Lewis, American singer-songwriter and pianist (died 2022)
- 1935 – Carmen Delgado Votaw, Puerto Rican civil rights pioneer (died 2017)
- 1936 – Silvio Berlusconi, Italian businessman and politician, Prime Minister of Italy (died 2023)
- 1936 – James Fogle, American author (died 2012)
- 1936 – Hal Trosky, Jr., American baseball player (died 2012)
- 1937 – Kōichirō Matsuura, Japanese diplomat
- 1937 – Tom McKeown, American poet and educator
- 1938 – Wim Kok, Dutch union leader and politician, Prime Minister of the Netherlands (died 2018)
- 1938 – Michael Stürmer, German historian
- 1939 – Jim Baxter, Scottish footballer (died 2001)
- 1939 – Larry Linville, American actor (died 2000)
- 1939 – Rhodri Morgan, Welsh politician, 2nd First Minister of Wales (died 2017)
- 1940 – Billy Cobb, English footballer (died 2021)
- 1941 – Oscar H. Ibarra, Filipino-American theoretical computer scientist
- 1941 – Jon Brower Minnoch, famous for being the world's heaviest person recorded (died 1983)
- 1941 – Robert Lieber, American writer and academic
- 1942 – Felice Gimondi, Italian cyclist (died 2019)
- 1942 – Madeline Kahn, American actress and singer (died 1999)
- 1942 – Ian McShane, English actor
- 1942 – Bill Nelson, American politician
- 1942 – Jean-Luc Ponty, French violinist and composer
- 1942 – Janet Powell, Australian educator and politician (died 2013)
- 1942 – Steve Tesich, Serbian-American screenwriter and playwright (died 1996)
- 1943 – Juan Flores, American academic and professor (died 2014)
- 1943 – Lech Wałęsa, Polish electrician and politician, 2nd President of Poland, Nobel Prize laureate
- 1944 – Isla Blair, British actress and singer
- 1944 – Mike Post, American composer and producer
- 1945 – Kyriakos Sfetsas, Greek composer and poet
- 1945 – Lella Cuberli, American soprano
- 1946 – Patricia Hodge, English actress
- 1946 – Arturo Lindsay, Panamanian-American artist
- 1947 – Richard J. Evans, British historian
- 1947 – Ülo Kaevats, Estonian philosopher, academic, and politician (died 2015)
- 1947 – S. H. Kapadia, Indian lawyer, judge, and politician, 38th Chief Justice of India (died 2016)
- 1948 – Mark Farner, American singer-songwriter and guitarist
- 1948 – Bryant Gumbel, American journalist and sportscaster
- 1948 – Theo Jörgensmann, German clarinet player and composer (died 2025)
- 1948 – John M. McHugh, American politician
- 1949 – George Dalaras, Greek singer-songwriter and guitarist
- 1949 – Douglas Frantz, American investigative journalist and author
- 1950 – Merle Collins, Grenadian poet and short story writer
- 1951 – Michelle Bachelet, Chilean politician, President of Chile
- 1951 – Pier Luigi Bersani, Italian educator and politician, 6th President of Emilia-Romagna
- 1951 – Roslyn Schwartz, Canadian author
- 1951 – Mike Enriquez, Filipino television and radio newscaster (died 2023)
- 1952 – Roy Campbell, Jr., American trumpet player (died 2014)
- 1952 – Pete Hautman, American author
- 1952 – Max Sandlin, American lawyer, judge, and politician
- 1953 – Mona Baker, Egyptian-British professor
- 1953 – Drake Hogestyn, American actor (died 2024)
- 1953 – Janis F. Kearney, American author, lecturer and publisher
- 1954 – Marshall Holman, American bowler and sportscaster
- 1954 – Harry E. Johnson, American lawyer and public servant
- 1954 – Geoffrey Marcy, American astronomer
- 1954 – Mark Mitchell, Australian actor
- 1954 – Cindy Morgan, American actress (died 2023)
- 1955 – Ann Bancroft, American explorer and author
- 1955 – Joe Donnelly, American politician and lawyer
- 1955 – Gwen Ifill, American journalist (died 2016)
- 1956 – Susanne Antonetta, American poet and author
- 1956 – Sebastian Coe, English sprinter and politician
- 1956 – Suzzy Roche, American singer-songwriter and actress
- 1957 – Chris Broad, English cricketer and referee
- 1957 – Andrew Dice Clay, American comedian and actor
- 1957 – Uwe Foullong, German politician
- 1957 – Joel Gallen, American director, producer and screenwriter
- 1957 – Mark Nicholas, English cricketer and sportscaster
- 1958 – Andy Straka, American author
- 1958 – Karen Young, American actress
- 1959 – Jon Fosse, Norwegian author and dramatist
- 1959 – Marissa Moss, American author
- 1959 – Raf, Italian singer-songwriter
- 1960 – Rob Deer, American baseball player
- 1960 – John Paxson, American basketball player and executive
- 1961 – Mohammed Dahlan, Palestinian politician
- 1961 – Julia Gillard, Welsh-Australian lawyer and politician, 27th Prime Minister of Australia
- 1962 – Roger Bart, American actor
- 1963 – Dave Andreychuk, Canadian ice hockey player
- 1963 – Les Claypool, American bass player, singer, songwriter, and producer
- 1963 – Francis Jue, American actor and singer
- 1964 – PJ Manney, American writer
- 1965 – Suzanne Kamata, American author and educator
- 1965 – Robert F. Worth, American journalist
- 1966 – Hersey Hawkins, American basketball player and coach
- 1966 – Ben Miles, English actor
- 1966 – Bujar Nishani, Albanian politician, 7th President of Albania (died 2022)
- 1966 – Ken Norton Jr., American football player and coach
- 1966 – Alexandra Vieira, Portuguese teacher and politician
- 1966 – Jill Whelan, American actress
- 1967 – Sara Sankey, English badminton player
- 1967 – Brett Anderson, English singer and songwriter
- 1968 – Darius de Haas, American stage actor and singer
- 1968 – Luke Goss, English actor
- 1968 – Adam Segal, American cybersecurity expert
- 1969 – Erika Eleniak, American model and actress
- 1969 – Robert Kurzban, American author and professor
- 1969 – Carlos Watson, American entrepreneur, journalist and television host
- 1970 – Natasha Gregson Wagner, American actress
- 1970 – Khushbu Sundar, Indian actress, producer, and politician
- 1970 – Emily Lloyd, English actress
- 1970 – Russell Peters, Canadian comedian, actor, and producer
- 1970 – Yoshihiro Tajiri, Japanese wrestler
- 1971 – Joanna Brooks, American author and professor
- 1971 – Ray Buchanan, American football player
- 1971 – Mackenzie Crook, English actor and screenwriter
- 1971 – Theodore Shapiro, American composer
- 1972 – Jörgen Jönsson, Swedish ice hockey player
- 1972 – Robert Webb, English comedian, actor and writer
- 1973 – Alfie Boe, English tenor and actor
- 1974 – Alexis Cruz, American actor
- 1974 – Dedric Ward, American football wide receiver
- 1975 – Stephanie Klein, American author
- 1976 – Darren Byfield, English-Jamaican footballer
- 1976 – Kelvin Davis, English footballer
- 1977 – Heath Bell, American baseball player
- 1978 – Kurt Nilsen, Norwegian singer-songwriter and guitarist
- 1978 – Neville Roach, English footballer
- 1978 – Nathan West, American actor, musician, and singer
- 1980 – Dallas Green, Canadian singer-songwriter and guitarist
- 1980 – Zachary Levi, American actor and singer
- 1980 – Chrissy Metz, American actress
- 1981 – Kelly McCreary, American actress
- 1981 – Suzanne Shaw, English actress and singer
- 1983 – Ryan Garry, English footballer and coach
- 1984 – Per Mertesacker, German footballer
- 1985 – Calvin Johnson, American football player
- 1985 – Michelle Payne, Australian jockey
- 1986 – Inika McPherson, American track and field athlete
- 1987 – Josh Farro, American musician
- 1988 – Kevin Durant, American basketball player
- 1989 – Shyima Hall, Egyptian human rights activist
- 1990 – Jordan Schroeder, American ice hockey player
- 1991 – Souleymane Doukara, French footballer
- 1993 – Enxhi Seli-Zacharias, German politician
- 1994 – Halsey, American singer
- 1994 – Nicholas Galitzine, English actor
- 1995 – Julien Baker, American singer-songwriter
- 1995 – Abhijeet Dipke, Indian satirical politician
- 1995 – Sasha Lane, American actress
- 1999 – Choi Ye-na, South Korean singer and dancer
- 2000 – Jaden McDaniels, American basketball player

== Deaths ==
=== Pre-1600 ===
- 722 – Leudwinus, Frankish archbishop and saint (born 660)
- 855 – Lothair I, Carolingian emperor (born 795)
- 1186 – William of Tyre, Archbishop of Tyre (born 1130)
- 1225 – Arnaud Amalric, Papal legate who allegedly promoted mass murder
- 1298 – Guido I da Montefeltro, Italian military strategist (born 1223)
- 1304 – John de Warenne, 6th Earl of Surrey, English general (born 1231)
- 1364 – Charles I, Duke of Brittany (born 1319)
- 1382 – Izz al-Din ibn Rukn al-Din Mahmud, malik of Sistan
- 1501 – Andrew Stewart, Scottish bishop (born 1442)
- 1560 – Gustav I of Sweden (born 1496)

=== 1601–1900 ===
- 1637 – Lorenzo Ruiz, Filipino martyr and saint (born 1600)
- 1642 – René Goupil, French missionary and saint (born 1608)
- 1642 – William Stanley, 6th Earl of Derby, English politician, Lord Lieutenant of Cheshire (born 1561)
- 1715 – George Haliburton, Scottish bishop (born 1635)
- 1800 – Michael Denis, Austrian poet and author (born 1729)
- 1804 – Michael Hillegas, American politician, 1st Treasurer of the United States (born 1728)
- 1833 – Ferdinand VII of Spain (born 1784)
- 1850 – David Keith Ballow, Scottish-Australian doctor (born 1804)
- 1861 – Tekla Bądarzewska-Baranowska, Polish composer and pianist (born 1829 or 1834)
- 1862 – William "Bull" Nelson, American general (born 1824)
- 1867 – Sterling Price, American major general and politician (born 1809)
- 1887 – Bernhard von Langenbeck, German surgeon and academic (born 1810)
- 1889 – Louis Faidherbe, French general and politician (born 1818)
- 1898 – Thomas F. Bayard, American lawyer, politician and diplomat (born 1828)
- 1900 – Samuel Fenton Cary, American lawyer and politician (born 1814)

=== 1901–present ===
- 1902 – William McGonagall, Scottish poet and actor (born 1825)
- 1902 – Émile Zola, French journalist, author, and playwright (born 1840)
- 1904 – Alfred Nehring, German zoologist and paleontologist (born 1845)
- 1905 – Alexander Hay Japp, Scottish author, journalist and publisher (born 1836)
- 1908 – Machado de Assis, Brazilian author, poet, and playwright (born 1839)
- 1910 – Rebecca Harding Davis, American author and journalist (born 1831)
- 1910 – Winslow Homer, American painter, illustrator, and engraver (born 1836)
- 1913 – Rudolf Diesel, German engineer, invented the diesel engine (born 1858)
- 1913 – John F. Lacey, American politician (born 1841)
- 1915 – Luther Orlando Emerson, American musician, composer and music publisher (born 1820)
- 1915 – Rudi Stephan, German composer (born 1887)
- 1918 – Lawrence Weathers, Australian soldier (born 1890).
- 1919 – Edward Pulsford, English-Australian politician and free-trade campaigner (born 1844)
- 1923 – Walther Penck, German geologist and geomorphologist (born 1888)
- 1925 – Léon Bourgeois, French police officer and politician, 64th Prime Minister of France, Nobel Prize laureate (born 1851)
- 1925 – Runar Schildt, Finnish author (born 1888)
- 1927 – Arthur Achleitner, German journalist and author (born 1858)
- 1927 – Willem Einthoven, Indonesian-Dutch physiologist and physician, Nobel Prize laureate (born 1860)
- 1928 – John Devoy, Irish-American Fenian rebel leader (born 1842)
- 1928 – Ernst Steinitz, German mathematician (born 1871)
- 1930 – Ilya Repin, Ukrainian-Russian painter and illustrator (born 1844)
- 1931 – William Orpen, Irish artist (born 1878)
- 1933 – Jean-François Delmas, French bass-baritone (born 1861)
- 1935 – Winifred Holtby, English novelist and journalist (born 1898)
- 1937 – Marie Zdeňka Baborová-Čiháková, Czech botanist and zoologist (born 1877)
- 1937 – Ray Ewry, American triple jumper (born 1873)
- 1944 – Douglas Crawford McMurtrie, American typeface designer, graphic designer, historian and author (born 1888)
- 1949 – Rosa Olitzka, German-American contralto singer (born 1873)
- 1951 – Thomas Cahill, American soccer player and coach (born 1864)
- 1952 – John Cobb, English racing driver and pilot (born 1899)
- 1952 – C. H. Douglas, British engineer (born 1879)
- 1953 – Ernst Reuter, German politician (born 1889)
- 1955 – Louis Leon Thurstone, American psychologist (born 1887)
- 1955 – Hubert Maitland Turnbull, British pathologist (born 1875)
- 1956 – Anastasio Somoza García, Nicaraguan politician, 21st President of Nicaragua (born 1896)
- 1958 – Aarre Merikanto, Finnish composer (born 1893)
- 1959 – Bruce Bairnsfather, British humorist and cartoonist (born 1887)
- 1960 – John Baillie, Scottish theologian (born 1886)
- 1960 – Vladimir Dimitrov, Bulgarian artist (born 1882)
- 1960 – John Goodwin, British soldier and medical practitioner, 14th Governor of Queensland (born 1871)
- 1966 – Bernard Gimbel, American businessman (born 1885)
- 1967 – Carson McCullers, American novelist, playwright, essayist, and poet (born 1917)
- 1970 – Edward Everett Horton, American actor (born 1886)
- 1970 – Gilbert Seldes, American writer and cultural critic (born 1893)
- 1972 – Kathleen Clarke, Irish politician and activist (born 1878)
- 1973 – W. H. Auden, English-American poet, playwright, and critic (born 1907)
- 1975 – Gladys Skelton, Australian-British poet, novelist and playwright (born 1885)
- 1975 – Casey Stengel, American baseball player and manager (born 1890)
- 1977 – Robert McKimson, American animator and illustrator (born 1910)
- 1977 – Alexander Tcherepnin, Russian-American composer and pianist (born 1899)
- 1979 – Francisco Macías Nguema, Equatoguinean politician, 1st President of Equatorial Guinea (born 1924)
- 1979 – Ivan Wyschnegradsky, Russian composer (born 1893)
- 1980 – Harold Alexander Abramson, American physician (born 1889)
- 1981 – Bill Shankly, Scottish footballer and manager (born 1913)
- 1981 – Frances Yates, English historian (born 1899)
- 1982 – A. L. Lloyd, English folk singer (born 1908)
- 1982 – Monty Stratton, American baseball player and coach (born 1912)
- 1983 – Alan Moorehead, Australian war correspondent and author (born 1910)
- 1984 – Geater Davis, American singer and songwriter (born 1946)
- 1984 – Hal Porter, Australian novelist, playwright and poet (born 1911)
- 1987 – Henry Ford II, American businessman (born 1917)
- 1988 – Charles Addams, American cartoonist (born 1912)
- 1989 – Gussie Busch, American businessman (born 1899)
- 1989 – Georges Ulmer, Danish-French singer-songwriter and actor (born 1919)
- 1991 – Grace Zaring Stone, American novelist and short-story writer (born 1891)
- 1992 – Jean Aurenche, French screenwriter (born 1904)
- 1992 – William H. Sebrell Jr., American nutritionist, 7th Director of the National Institutes of Health (born 1901)
- 1992 – Don West, American writer, poet, educator, trade union organizer and civil-rights activist (born 1906)
- 1993 – Gordon Douglas, American actor, director, and screenwriter (born 1907)
- 1995 – Madalyn Murray O'Hair, American atheist and activist (born 1919)
- 1996 – Shūsaku Endō, Japanese author (born 1923)
- 1997 – Sven-Eric Johanson, Swedish composer and organist (born 1919)
- 1997 – Roy Lichtenstein, American painter and sculptor (born 1923)
- 1997 – Edith Ballinger Price, American writer and illustrator (born 1897)
- 1998 – Tom Bradley, American lieutenant and politician, 38th Mayor of Los Angeles (born 1917)
- 1998 – C. David Marsden, British neurologist (born 1938)
- 1998 – Bruno Munari, Italian artist, designer, and inventor (born 1907)
- 1999 – Edward William O'Rourke, American bishop (born 1917)
- 2000 – John Grant, English journalist and politician (born 1932)
- 2001 – Mabel Fairbanks, American figure skater and coach (born 1915)
- 2001 – Nguyễn Văn Thiệu, South Vietnamese military officer and politician, 2nd President of South Vietnam (born 1923)
- 2004 – Richard Sainct, French motorcycle racer (born 1970)
- 2004 – Patrick Wormald, English historian (born 1947)
- 2005 – Patrick Caulfield, English painter and academic (born 1936)
- 2005 – Austin Leslie, American chef and author (born 1934)
- 2006 – Walter Hadlee, New Zealand cricketer and manager (born 1915)
- 2006 – Michael A. Monsoor, American sailor, Medal of Honor recipient (born 1981)
- 2006 – Louis-Albert Vachon, Canadian cardinal (born 1912)
- 2007 – Lois Maxwell, Canadian actress (born 1927)
- 2007 – Katsuko Saruhashi, Japanese geochemist (born 1920)
- 2008 – Hayden Carruth, American poet and critic (born 1921)
- 2010 – Tony Curtis, American actor (born 1925)
- 2010 – Greg Giraldo, American comedian, actor, and screenwriter (born 1965)
- 2011 – Sylvia Robinson, American singer-songwriter and producer (born 1936)
- 2012 – Neil Smith, Scottish geographer and academic (born 1954)
- 2012 – Arthur Ochs Sulzberger, American publisher (born 1926)
- 2012 – Malcolm Wicks, English academic and politician (born 1947)
- 2013 – Harold Agnew, American physicist and engineer (born 1921)
- 2013 – S. N. Goenka, Indian teacher of Vipassanā meditation (born 1924)
- 2013 – Marcella Hazan, Italian cooking writer (born 1924)
- 2014 – Mary Cadogan, English author (born 1928)
- 2014 – John Ritchie, New Zealand composer and educator (born 1921)
- 2015 – Nawwaf bin Abdulaziz Al Saud, Saudi Arabian prince (born 1932)
- 2015 – Hellmuth Karasek, Czech-German journalist, author, and critic (born 1934)
- 2015 – Phil Woods, American saxophonist, composer, and bandleader (born 1931)
- 2016 – Miriam Defensor Santiago, Filipina politician (born 1945)
- 2017 – Tom Alter, Indian actor (born 1950)
- 2018 – Otis Rush, American blues guitarist and singer (born 1934)
- 2019 – Martin Bernheimer, German-American music critic (born 1936)
- 2020 – Sabah Al-Ahmad Al-Jaber Al-Sabah, Kuwaiti Emir (born 1929)
- 2020 – Helen Reddy, Australian-American singer, actress, and activist (born 1941)
- 2022 – Kathleen Booth, British computer scientist and mathematician (born 1922)
- 2022 – Akissi Kouamé, Ivorian army officer (born 1955)
- 2024 – Ozzie Virgil Sr., Dominican baseball player and coach (born 1932)
- 2025 – Patrick Murray, British actor (born 1956)
- 2025 – Alan McDonald, Scottish Church Minister (born 1951)

== Holidays and observances ==
- Christian feast day:
  - Charles, Duke of Brittany
  - Cyriacus the Anchorite
  - Hripsime
  - Blessed Francesc de Paula Castelló Aleu
  - Guillaume Courtet
  - Jean de Montmirail
  - John of Dukla
  - René Goupil
  - Theodota of Philippi
  - September 29 (Eastern Orthodox liturgics)
  - the Archangels Michael, Gabriel, and Raphael. One of the four quarter days in the Irish calendar. (England and Ireland). Called Michaelmas in some western liturgical traditions.
- Inventors' Day (Argentina)
- Victory of Boquerón Day (Paraguay)
