= Balten =

Balten is a surname. Notable people with the surname include:

- Adam Balten (born 1983), Polish–German politician
- Pieter Balten (1527–1584), Flemish Renaissance painter
