= Rothweiler =

Rothweiler is a surname. It may refer to:

- Martin Rothweiler (born 1978), German politician (AfD)
- Stefanie Rothweiler (born 1979), German yacht racer
