= Rohde =

Rohde is a surname. Notable people with the surname include:

- Brigitte Rohde (born 1954), East-German athlete
- Christian Rohde (born 1988), German politician
- David Rohde (born 1967), American journalist
- David W. Rohde (born 1944), American political scientist
- Dennis Rohde (born 1986), German politician
- Eduard Rohde (1828–1883), German composer
- Eleanour Sinclair Rohde (1880–1948), British gardener
- Erwin Rohde (1845–1898), German classical scholar
- Gabriele Rohde (1904–1946), Danish League of Nations official
- Gilbert Rohde (1894–1944), American furniture designer
- Hans Rohde (1914–1979), German footballer
- Helmut Rohde (1925–2016), German politician
- Herman C. Rohde, Jr., "Nature Boy" Buddy Rogers, (1921–1992), professional wrestler
- Hubert Rohde, German politician
- Jens Rohde, Danish politician
- Joe Rohde, American themed entertainment designer and artist
- Johan Rohde, Danish artist and designer
- Klaus Rohde, German biologist
- Leonard Emil Rohde (born 1938), American football player
- Lothar Rohde, German businessman, founder of Rohde & Schwarz
- Małgorzata Rohde, Polish member of parliament for the Conservative People's Party
- Michael Rohde (footballer) (1894–1979), Danish footballer
- Michael Rohde (chess player) (born 1959), American chess grandmaster
- Michael Rohde (botanist) (1782–1812), German botanist
- Peter Rohde (born 1964), Australian footballer
- Peter Rohde, Danish swimmer
- Q’Adrianne Rohde, pseudonym for American composer Dee Libbey (1919–1988)
- Robert Rohde, American physicist
- Shelley Rohde (1933–2007), British journalist and author
