= We Citizens (Germany) =

German political party

We Citizens Wir Bürger
- Abbreviation: WB
- Chairman: Jürgen Joost
- Founder: Bernd Lucke
- Founded: 19 July 2015
- Split from: Alternative for Germany
- Membership (2015): 2,000
- Ideology: Conservatism; Economic liberalism
- Political position: Right-wing
- European affiliation: European Conservatives and Reformists Party
- Bundestag: 0 / 630 (0%)
- European Parliament: 0 / 96 (0%)
- State Parliaments: 0 / 1,855

Website
- lkr.de

We Citizens (German: Wir Bürger, WB) is a political party in Germany. Formerly Liberal Conservative Reformers (German: Liberal-Konservative Reformer, LKR), it was known from July 2015 to November 2016 as ALFA.

The party was established in July 2015 as a split from the Alternative for Germany (AfD) led by former AfD spokesman Bernd Lucke. It was founded as the Alliance for Progress and Renewal (German: Allianz für Fortschritt und Aufbruch, ALFA), but changed its name in November 2016 after litigation with the anti-abortion organization "Aktion Lebensrecht für Alle" (Action Right to Life for All) which uses the same acronym.

The party was initially represented by five MEPs in the European Parliament (as members of the European Conservatives and Reformists group) and three members of the Bürgerschaft of Bremen due to their formal withdrawal from the AfD. In September 2018, all its MEPs but Lucke left the party. In the 2019 European Elections and the Bremen state election on the same day, LKR lost all its remaining seats in the European Parliament and Bremen.

== History ==
The party founding was preceded by months of power struggle between Bernd Lucke and Frauke Petry for AfD party leadership, the latter being leader of the party's national-conservative wing. In the course of the dispute Lucke and leading AfD members with liberal-conservative and economic liberal orientations founded the association Weckruf 2015 (wake-up call 2015) out of concern for a perceived right-wing populist tendency in the AfD.

At an extraordinary party convention in Essen on 4 July 2015, Lucke was defeated in the election for chairman by his opponent Petry, who received 60% of the vote. The following week, five AfD MEPs exited the party on 7 July 2015, and Lucke announced his resignation from the party on 8 July, leading to the formation of the ALFA party.

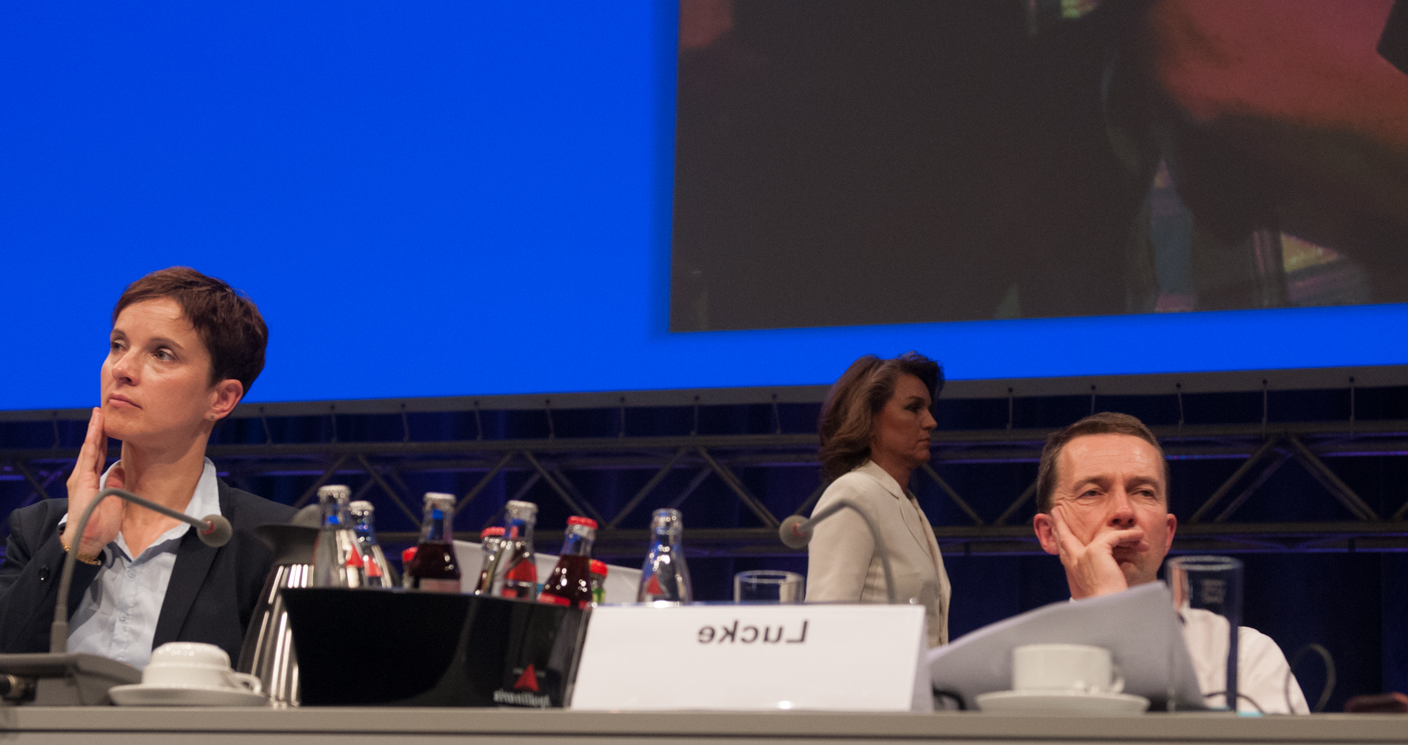
Bernd Lucke and Frauke Petry at the 2015 AfD convention in Essen

ALFA was formally founded on 19 July 2015 at a closed inaugural meeting of 70 people in Kassel, Hesse where statutes and a party platform were approved and Bernd Lucke MEP was elected chairman. Also selected as its foundation were its deputy chairmen was Bernd Kölmel MEP, Gunther Nickel and Reiner Rohlje, and the general secretary Ulrike Trebesius MEP. Former party treasurer Piet Leidreiter also joined the party.

It has been estimated that 20% percent of the then AfD membership moved to ALFA with Lucke.

On 18 March 2016, ALFA was admitted into the Alliance of European Conservatives and Reformists.

The party met on 4 June 2016 for its second convention, at which Ulrike Trebesius, member of the European Parliament, was elected party chairwoman. On her side her fellow MEP Bernd Kölmel, Ulrich van Suntum, professor of economics at Münster University and chairman of the party at state level in North Rhine-Westphalia, and Christian Schäfer, chair of the ALFA caucus in the state parliament of Bremen, were elected vice chairmen. Bernd Lucke was instead elected almost unanimously the party's number one candidate for the next general election in Germany, that will be held in 2017. Later that year Trebesius resigned from office. Thus Christian Kott from Bremen was elected chairman on 12 November 2016, in Frankfurt. On the same convention party delegates also changed the party's name to Liberal-Conservative Reformers. Since then the party name is often abbreviated LKR.

On 17 September 2017, a new party executive committee was elected, with Bernd Kölmel as party chairman. Other members of the executive committee include Bernd Lucke, Ulrike Trebesius and Hans-Olaf Henkel.

In September 2018, Joachim Starbatty was the first member to leave the party.

Henkel stated that since the party split from the AfD in July 2015 that the media no longer took notice of the party, stating it would be a "challenge" for the five LKR MEPs to be re-elected in 2019. Henkel, who would be 79 in 2019, did not plan to stand for election again. In the 2019 European Parliament election, LKR lost all its remaining seats in the European Parliament.

In Autumn 2020, MPs Uwe Kamann and Mario Mieruch left Alternative for Germany and joined LKR; therefore, the party regained a representation in the Bundestag.

In July 2021 the Independent Member of the European Parliament and Member of the European Conservatives and Reformists Lars Patrick Berg joined the party. In the 2021 German federal election, the party ran 52 direct candidates in eleven states. It polled less than 11,000 constituency votes (30th in rank) and less than 12,000 party votes, and thus won no seats in the Bundestag.

In early 2022, the party lost its last seats in the State Parliaments.

In January 2023, the Member of the European Parliament Lars Patrick Berg left the party and joined Bündnis Deutschland.

In June 2024, Wir Bürger started a potential merger with Bündnis Deutschland.

=== Former party acronym ALFA ===
The association "Action Right to Life for All" (Aktion Lebensrecht für Alle), shortened to ALfA in German, took legal action against the party because of the usage of the same acronym. The anti-abortion organization won at the Augsburg regional court. If the party was to disobey, it would be subject to a fine of 250,000 euros. Consequently, the party changed its name to "Liberal-Konservative Reformer" (Liberal-Conservative Reformers).

Separately, the German subsidiary of Alfa Romeo, the Italian car manufacturer, was reported as considering taking legal action against the party over the use of the acronym ALFA.

== Party platform ==
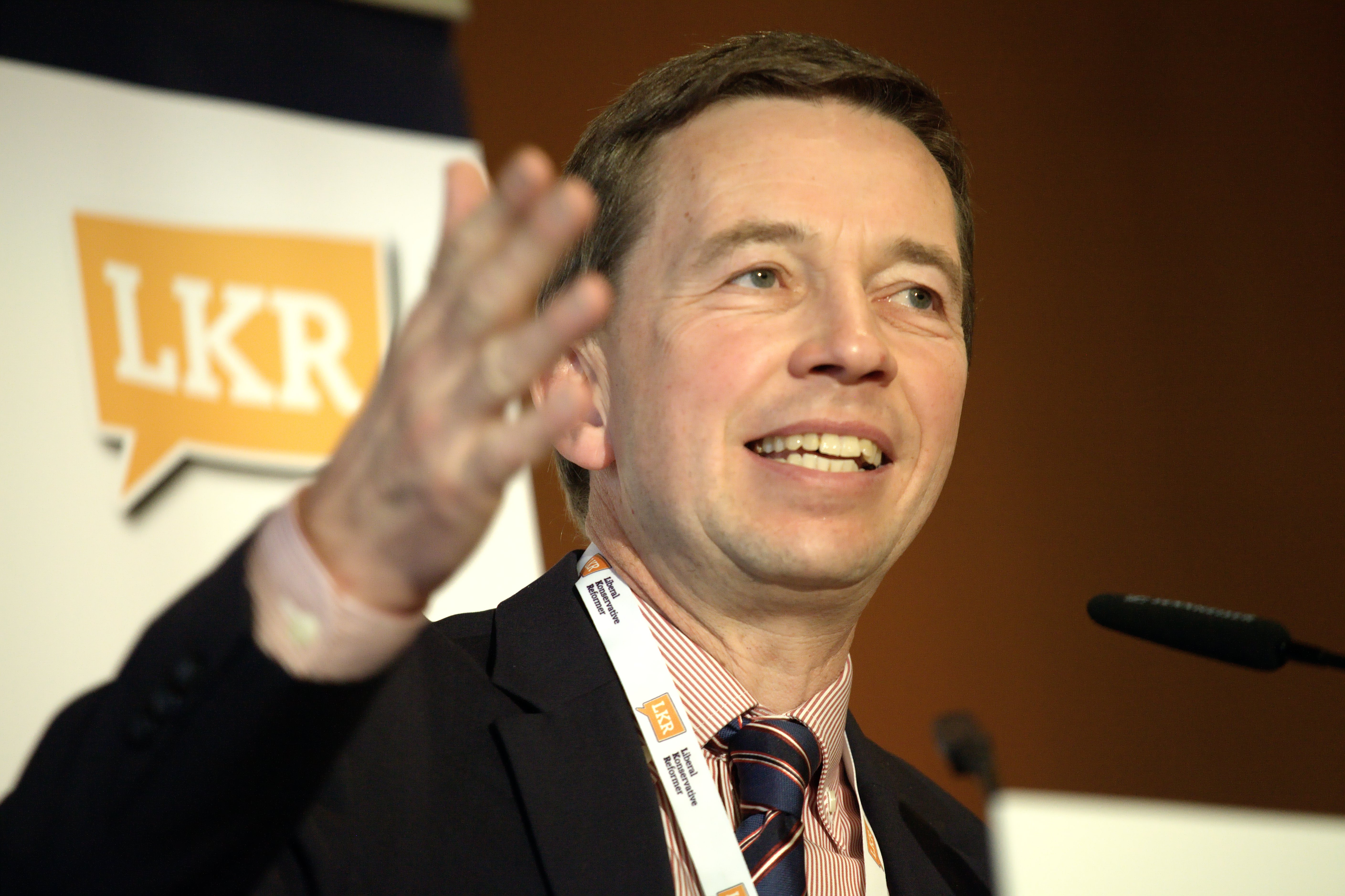
Bernd Lucke at the LKR's federal convention in Siegen, 2017

The party criticises the low-, zero- and negative-interest policies of the European Central Bank. It also emphasises Western alignment with NATO and the EU as the foundation of a transatlantic security structure. LKR favors free trade in general and under certain conditions the Transatlantic Trade and Investment Partnership (TTIP). It supports immigration of suitably qualified candidates on the Canadian model and is opposed to illegal immigration. The party rejects a minimum wage, but prefers a so-called activating minimum income for every citizen. The party describes itself as morally conservative, economically liberal and as an advocate of technological progress. The party fully rejects extremism of every kind. The party calls for fundamental reform of the European Union and the Eurozone, arguing it should go back to its "core competencies" with less political interference in member states, an end to migration quotas and no more bailouts for Eurozone members.

== Party structure ==
The party had a branch organisation in each of the 16 German states. In some states there were also regional organisations. Additionally there was a Youth Organisation, Junge Reformer (Young Reformers), shortened jure. Jure's chairman was also elected vice chairman of the European Young Conservatives. There was also a club of women within the party and an official group for small and medium-sized firm owners.
