= Ursula Braun-Moser =

German politician (1937–2022)

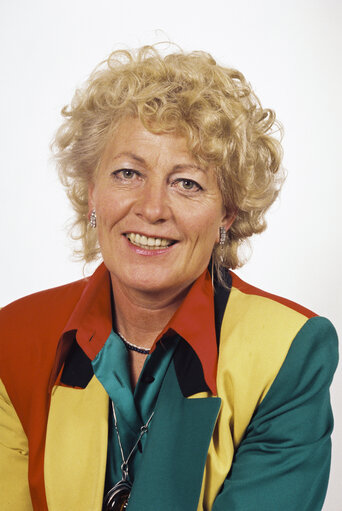

Member of the European Parliament
- In office 24 July 1984 – 24 July 1989
- Constituency: Germany
- In office 15 January 1990 – 18 July 1994
- Constituency: Germany

Personal details
- Born: 25 May 1937 Frankfurt, Hesse-Nassau, Prussia, Germany
- Died: 2 May 2022 (aged 84) Bad Vilbel, Hesse, Germany
- Party: CDU; AfD; LKR
- Education: Bavarian School of Public Policy; Université libre de Bruxelles

Ursula Braun-Moser (25 May 1937 – 2 May 2022) was a German politician. A member of the Christian Democratic Union of Germany, Alternative for Germany, and later the Liberal Conservative Reformers, she served in the European Parliament from 1984 to 1989 and again from 1990 to 1994. She died in Bad Vilbel on 2 May 2022 at the age of 84.
