= Joachim Starbatty =

German economist and politician (born 1940)

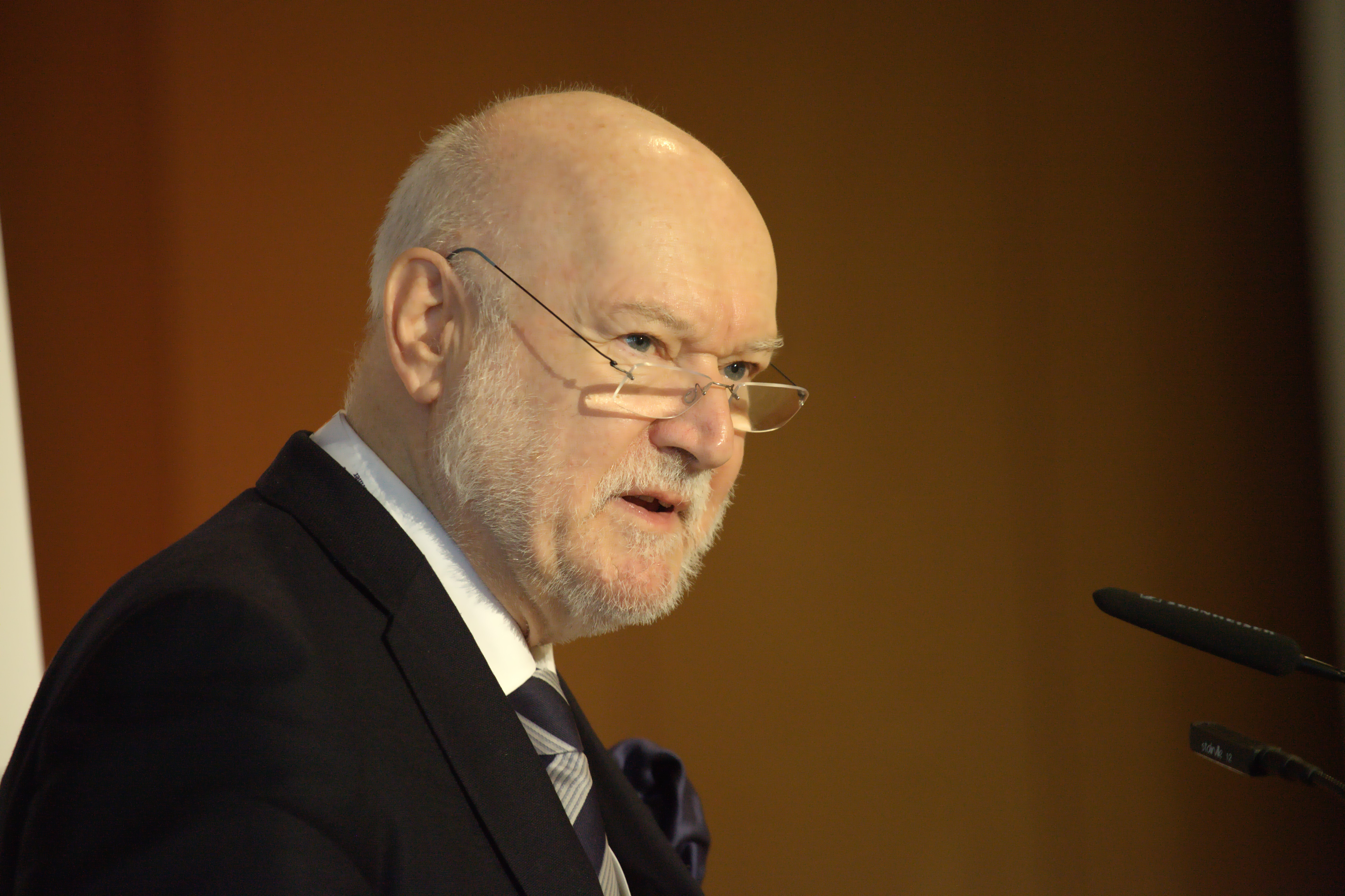
- Starbatty in 2017
- Born: 9 May 1940 (age 86); Düsseldorf
- Occupations: academic, politician
- Political party: AfD (2013–2015); LKR (2015–2018)

Joachim Starbatty (born 9 May 1940) is a German professor of economics and politician.

== Life ==
Starbatty was born in 1940 in Düsseldorf, West Germany. He studied economics in Freiburg and Cologne. After his graduation, he became assistant to Alfred Müller-Armack and worked from 1965 to 1969 at his Institute for Economic Policy in the University of Cologne. Müller-Armack, who had invented the term 'social market economy' had previously worked under Economics Minister Ludwig Erhard and then served as a state secretary for European Affairs. In 1967, Starbatty was awarded a Ph.D. From 1969 to 1972, he worked for the CDU/CSU faction in the Bundestag, the German parliament. After completing his habilitation, he became a professor at the University of Bochum in 1976. Later he taught at the University of Tubingen, where he held the chair for economics from 1983 to 2006. Starbatty taught several times as a guest professor at the University of Washington (1991, 1995, and 2002) in Seattle and at the Doshisha University in Kyoto, Japan. He received an honorary doctorate from the Viadrina University of Frankfurt (Oder). He is the author of several books on economics, the history of economics and lately also on political affairs, the last one together with Hans-Olaf Henkel, former head of the German Federation of Industry (BDI), with a harsh critique of Chancellor Angela Merkel. He also published numerous newspaper comments in Frankfurter Allgemeine Zeitung, Handelsblatt and lately in Junge Freiheit.

== Political activism ==
Starbatty has always advocated the "ordoliberal" economic model of the Freiburg School with a free market economy and a state that guarantees free and fair competition. For two decades he was a member of the CDU. In the 1990s, he was one of the leading opponents among the economics professor against the establishment of the Euro currency. He feared that the Euro would not be as strong and stable as the Deutsche Mark, that it might result in higher inflation and that Germany might ultimately be compelled to pay for the national debt of other countries within the currency zone. In 2010, when the Euro crisis erupted, he thought his fears had come true. Starbatty has launched together with other professors several legal challenges against the currency union and later the monetary policy of the European Central Bank at the German Constitutional Court with ultimately all failed.

In 2013, he was among the founders of the Eurosceptic party Alternative for Germany (AfD). He was elected to the European Parliament in 2014 where he served on the Committee for External Affairs and the Committee for International Trade.

He left the AfD in 2015, citing concerns that the party moving further to the political right would make "making different politics", which he had intended to do, an impossibility. Following his departure, he joined the Liberal Conservative Reformers, a small party founded by former AfD leader Bernd Lucke, but left in September 2018.

Starbatty was a guest speaker at the Desiderius-Erasmus-Stiftung, a foundation close to the AfD.
