= Hugh Bronson =

German/British politician (born 1961)

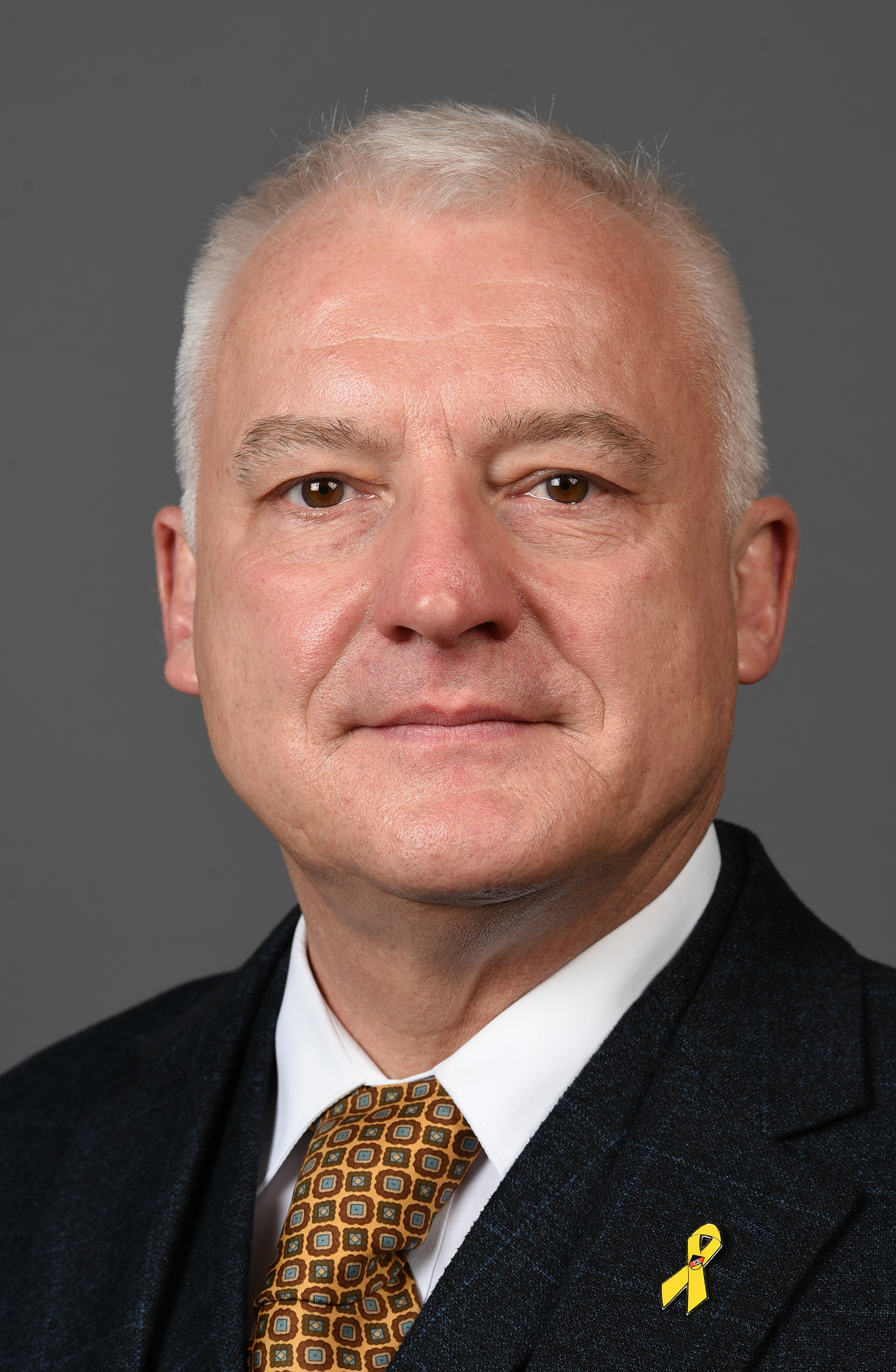

Member of the Abgeordnetenhaus of Berlin
- Incumbent
- Assumed office 18 September 2016

Personal details
- Born: Uwe Brunßen; 12 March 1961 (age 65) Apen, Lower Saxony, West Germany
- Party: Alternative for Germany (AfD)
- Education: Technische Universität Berlin; University of East Anglia

Hugh Theodore Bronson (born 12 March 1961 in Apen, Lower Saxony, as Uwe Brunßen) is a German-British politician of the party Alternative für Deutschland (Alternative for Germany – AfD). In the 2016 elections to Berlin's House of Representatives (Abgeordnetenhaus – AGH), he ran as a direct AfD candidate for the district Charlottenburg-Wilmersdorf and was elected to the Berlin's House of Representatives via the AfD list of candidates for the state Berlin (Landesliste).

== Life ==
After graduating from the Europaschule Gymnasium Westerstede in 1980, Bronson completed an apprenticeship as a nursery gardener in 1984. From 1986 to 1991 he studied literature, philosophy and English at the Free University of Berlin. He continued his studies at the University of East Anglia (UEA) in 1991 and graduated with a master's degree in 1993. He then worked as a research assistant at UEA and received a Doctor of Philosophy in 2001. After his studies, Bronson founded a conference company in Norwich, and took over the management of Informedia India in Mumbai in 2007. After returning to England in 2008, he worked as a freelance programme editor for Economist Conferences until 2013. Dr. Bronson moved to Berlin in 2012 and has been a member of the AfD since 10 April 2013. He taught German and English at a private Berlin language school until he moved into the House of Representatives on 18 September 2016.

Bronson was naturalised in the United Kingdom in 2007 and has held dual citizenship ever since. His birth name, Uwe Brunßen, was translated into English as Hugh Bronson. Bronson has been married to the lawyer Victoria Luise Bronson, née Tuschik, since 14 December 2018. They have a daughter. In September 2017, he was received as a guest speaker at the annual UKIP party conference in Torquay.

== Politics ==
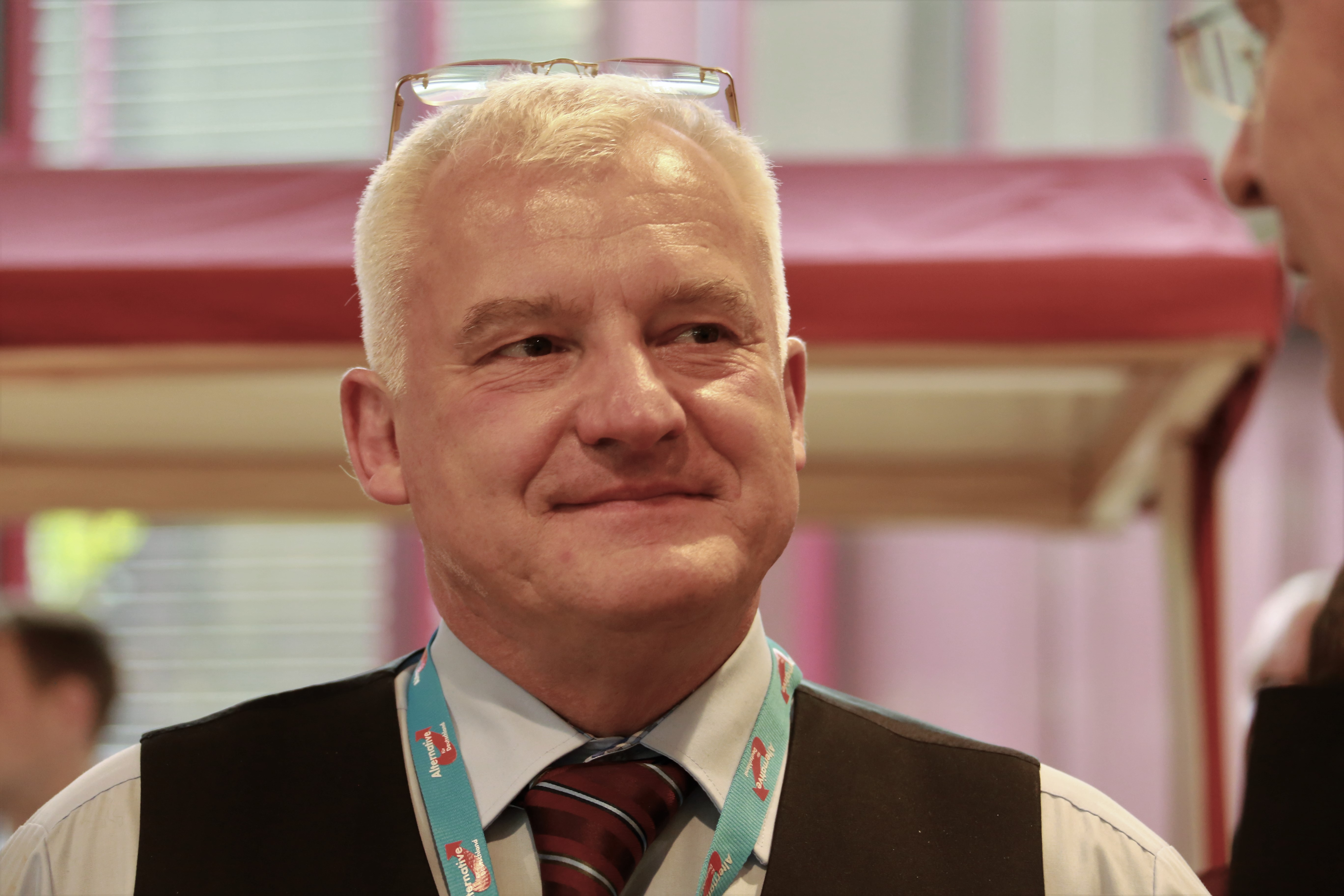
Bronson in 2017

After joining Alternative for Germany, Bronson held the position of vice chairman of the AfD Berlin from June 2015 to November 2017.

Since 2014, he has worked as deputy coordinator of the two AfD programmatic state specialist committees, LFA 14 Immigration, Asylum & Integration and LFA 12 Taxation and Finance. In March 2018 he was elected spokesman of the AfD district association Charlottenburg-Wilmersdorf.

Since his election to the Berlin House of Representatives in October 2016, Bronson has been acting as a policy spokesman for European and Federal Affairs. In December 2017, he was elected to the Presidium of the Parliament and was nominated as a delegate for AfD federal party conferences at the Land party conference of the Berlin AfD in May 2019.

In February 2018, Bronson was part of the eight-member delegation of AfD members of the Land parliament who accepted an invitation from the NGO "Deutsche nationale-kulturelle Autonomie der Republik Krim" (German National and Cultural Autonomy of the Republic of Crimea) to a one-week fact-finding visit to Crimea. The German politicians informed themselves on the spot about the effects of the economic sanctions imposed by the EU on Russia and were received for talks by the Prime Minister of the Crimea region, Sergiy Aksjonow. The trip was widely reported in the domestic and foreign press, and provoked threats of punishment from Ukraine as well as a critical statement by the German government.

In June 2018, Bronson travelled to Moscow and the industrial region of Kaluga for a four-day trip abroad. A five-member delegation of the AfD fractions from the Bundestag and the Berlin House of Representatives were warmly welcomed by the Governor of the Kaluga region, Anatomy Artamonov. The talks focused on the improvement of economic cooperation with regard to German supplier companies for the VW branch in Kaluga.

== Publications and media ==
From 2008 to 2013, Bronson worked as a freelance Programme Editor for the London weekly magazine and conference company Economist Conferences. As a guest commentator, he published articles in the newspaper Handelsblatt and the conservative weekly Junge Freiheit.

After joining AfD, Bronson was responsible for the production and moderation of seven episodes of AfD Radio from 2013 to 2016. He is a regular guest on English language radio and television broadcasts, such as BBC Global Questions "Politics and the People: A Divided Europe?" and "Eye to Eye" with Romano Bolkovic on the Croatian television channel HRT1.

== Member of the following committees ==
- Committee for European and Federal Affairs, Media
- Committee on Civic Engagement and Participation
- Committee on Petitions
