= Paul Backmund =

German politician (born 1991)

Member of the Landtag of Saxony-Anhalt
- Assuming office 6 October 2026
- Succeeding: Thomas Keindorf
- Constituency: Halle IV

Personal details
- Born: 1991 (age 34–35)
- Party: Alternative for Germany (since 2023)

Paul Backmund (born 1991) is a German politician who was elected member of the Landtag of Saxony-Anhalt in 2026. He has been a city councillor of Halle (Saale) since 2024.

Paul Backmunds parents emigrated from Russia to Germany. He is member of AfD since end of 2023 and became state chairmen of "Generation Deutschland".

He wanted to cancel any public founding for civil society organizations, like Sachsen-Anhalt weltoffen and „dry the left swamp“. He is member of the "Gladiator Fight Academy", a right wing meeting point in Halle/Saale.
