= Zacharias Schalley =

German politician (born 1991)

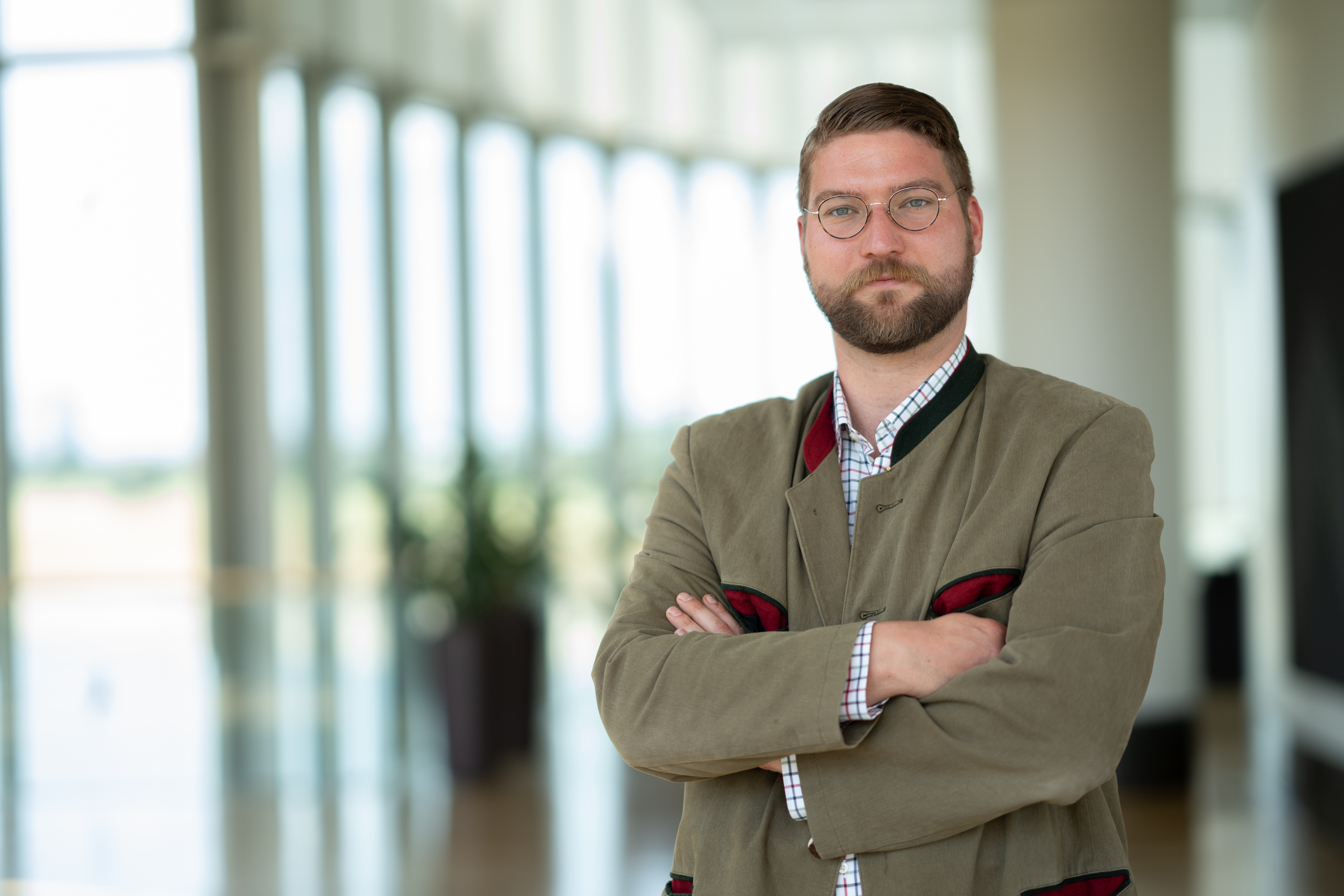
- Schalley in 2022

Member of the Landtag of North Rhine-Westphalia
- Incumbent
- Assumed office 1 June 2022

Personal details
- Born: 20 August 1991 (age 34) Krefeld
- Party: Alternative for Germany (since 2016)

Zacharias Schalley (born 20 August 1991 in Krefeld) is a German politician serving as a member of the Landtag of North Rhine-Westphalia since 2022. He has been a city councillor of Meerbusch since 2020.
