= Simon Lansmann =

German politician (born 1982)

Member of the Landtag of Saxony-Anhalt
- Assuming office 6 October 2026
- Succeeding: Carsten Borchert
- Constituency: Salzwedel

Personal details
- Born: 1982 (age 43–44)
- Party: Alternative for Germany

Simon Lansmann (born 1982) is a German politician who was elected member of the Landtag of Saxony-Anhalt in 2026. He has been a city councillor of Gardelegen since 2024.
