= Volker Dringenberg =

German politician (born 1972)

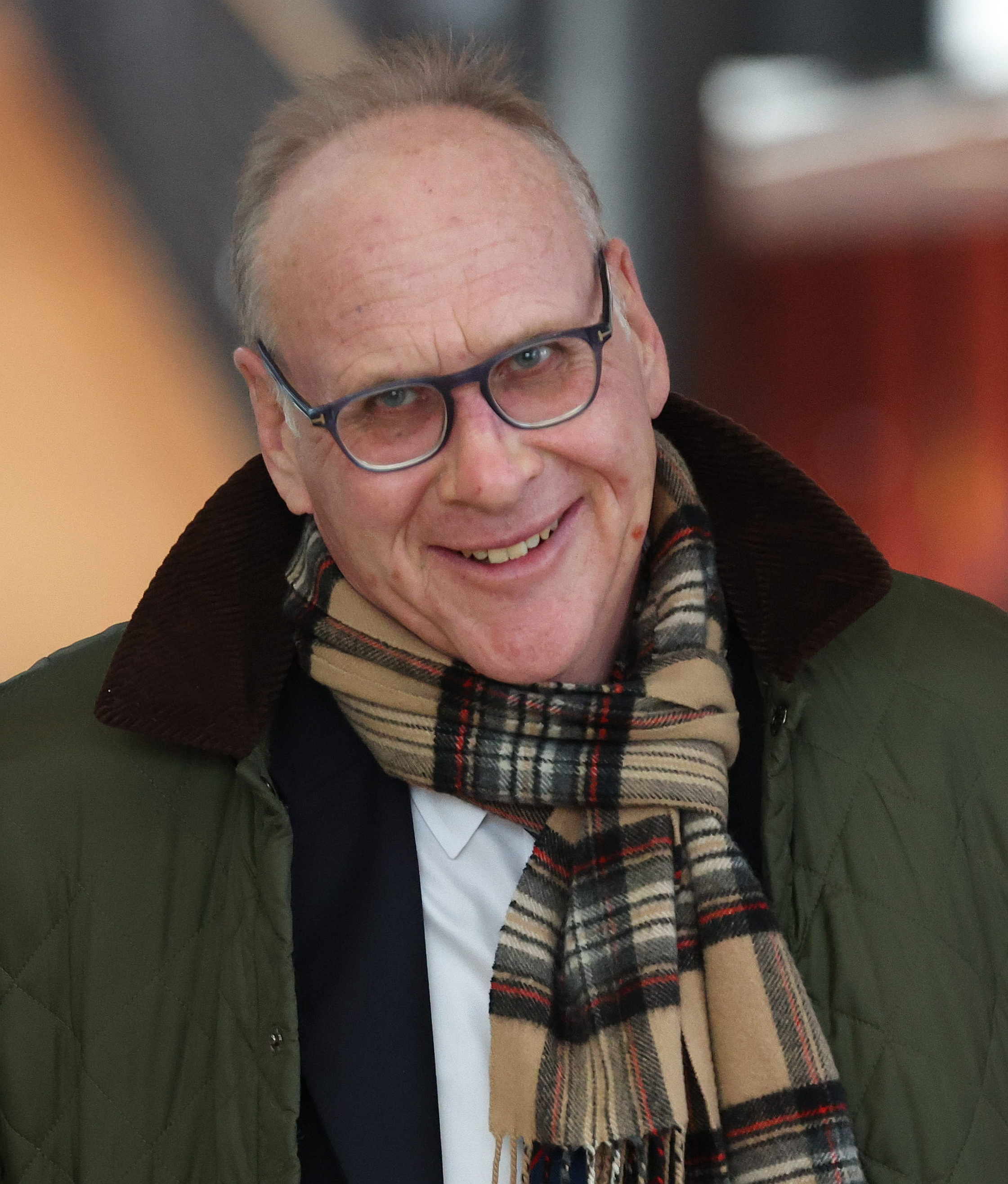
- Dringenberg in 2024

Member of the Landtag of Saxony
- Incumbent
- Assumed office 1 October 2019

Personal details
- Born: 1972 (age 53–54) Lübeck
- Party: Alternative for Germany (since 2013)

Volker Götz Dringenberg (born 1972 in Lübeck) is a German politician serving as a member of the Landtag of Saxony since 2019. He is the chairman of the committee on constitutional, legal and European affairs.
