= Pascal Schleich =

German politician (born 1994)

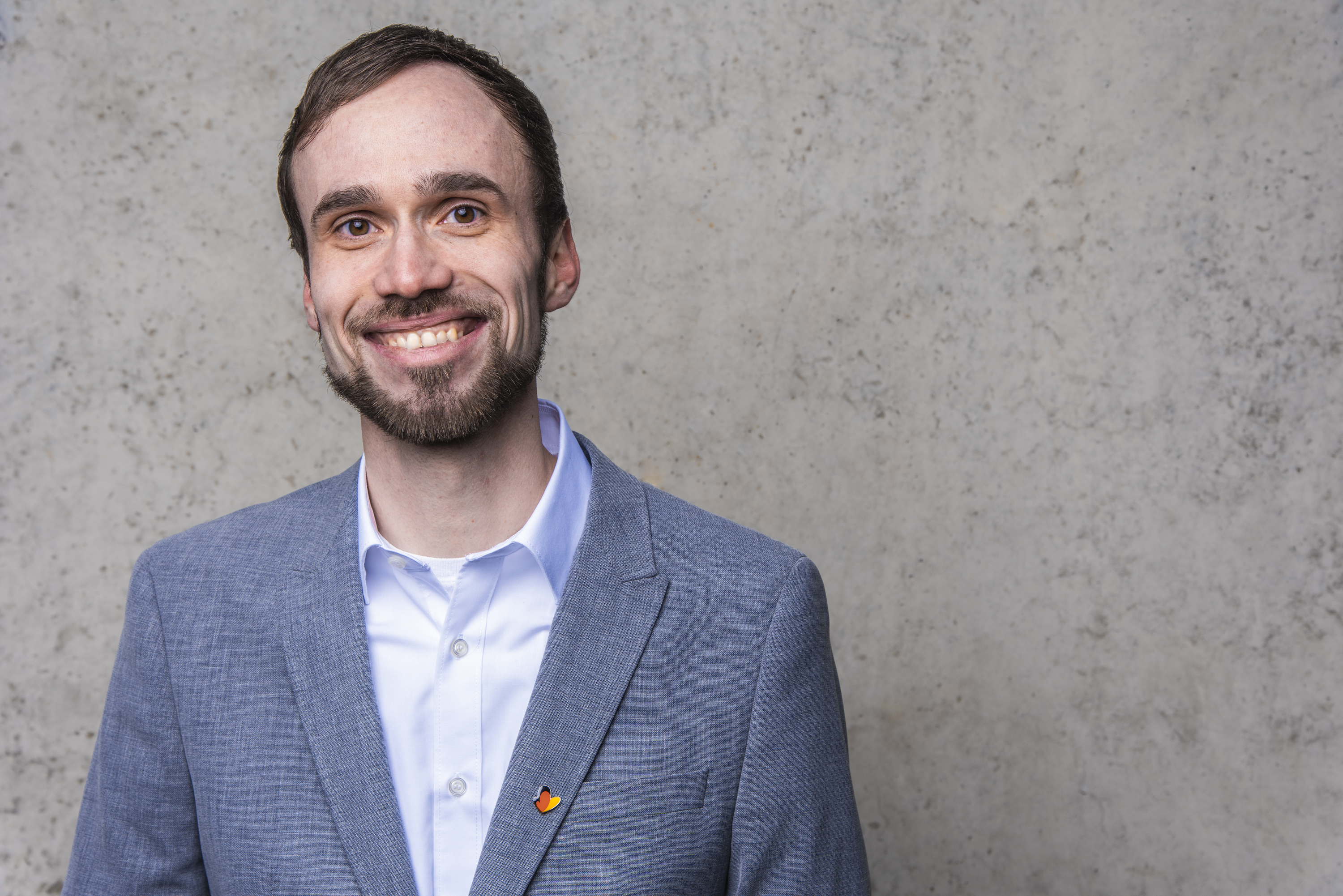
- Schleich in 2023

Member of the Landtag of Hesse
- Incumbent
- Assumed office 18 January 2024

Personal details
- Born: 21 January 1994 (age 32) Marburg
- Party: Alternative for Germany (since 2019)

Pascal Schleich (born 21 January 1994 in Marburg) is a German politician serving as a member of the Landtag of Hesse since 2024. He has been a member of the Alternative for Germany since 2019.
