= Iris Nieland =

German politician (born 1960)

Member of the Bundestag
- Incumbent
- Assumed office 25 March 2025
- Constituency: Rhineland-Palatinate

Member of the Landtag of Rhineland-Palatinate
- Incumbent
- Assumed office 18 May 2016

Personal details
- Born: 20 June 1960 (age 66)
- Party: Alternative for Germany (since 2013)

Iris Nieland (born 20 June 1960) is a German politician who was elected as a member of the Bundestag in 2025. She has been a member of the Landtag of Rhineland-Palatinate since 2016.
