= Jochen K. Roos =

German politician (born 1990)

Member of the Landtag of Hesse
- Incumbent
- Assumed office 18 January 2024

Personal details
- Born: 31 May 1990 (age 35) Offenbach am Main
- Party: Alternative for Germany

Jochen Kurt Roos (born 31 May 1990 in Offenbach am Main) is a German politician serving as a member of the Landtag of Hesse since 2024. He has served as chairman of the Alternative for Germany in Offenbach since 2024.
