= List of Liberal Democratic Party of Germany politicians =

A list of notable politicians of the Liberal Democratic Party of Germany:

== B ==
- Helmut Baierl
- Uwe Barth
- William Borm

== D ==
- Johannes Dieckmann

== E ==
- Adolf Ernst
- Arno Esch
- Erich Koch-Weser

== F ==
- Karl-Hermann Flach
- Rolf Frick

== G ==
- Hans-Dietrich Genscher
- Manfred Gerlach

== H ==
- Karl Hamann
- Willi Hein
- Erhard Hübener

== K ==
- Hermann Kastner
- Waldemar Koch
- Wilhelm Külz

== L ==
- Arthur Lieutenant
- Walter Linse
- Hans Loch
- Marie Elisabeth Lüders

== M ==
- Peter Moreth

== O ==
- Rainer Ortleb

== P ==
- Cornelia Pieper
- Matthias Platzeck

== S ==
- Eugen Schiffer
- Wilhelmine Schirmer-Pröscher
- Jürgen Schmieder
- Günter Stempel

== W ==
- Kurt Wünsche
