= Thomas Schmirander =

German politician (born 1977)

Member of the Landtag of Saxony-Anhalt
- Assuming office 6 October 2026
- Succeeding: Guido Heuer
- Constituency: Oschersleben-Wanzleben

Personal details
- Born: 1977 (age 48–49)
- Party: Alternative for Germany (since 2016)

Thomas Schmirander (born 1977) is a German politician who was elected member of the Landtag of Saxony-Anhalt in 2026. He has been a city councillor of Sülzetal and a district councillor of Börde since 2019.
