= Omid Najafi =

German politician (born 1988)

Member of the Landtag of Lower Saxony
- Incumbent
- Assumed office 8 November 2022

Personal details
- Born: 12 March 1988 (age 38) Traben-Trarbach, West Germany
- Party: Alternative for Germany (since 2021)

Omid Najafi (born 12 March 1988) is a German politician serving as a member of the Landtag of Lower Saxony since 2022. He has served as spokesperson for economic policy of the Alternative for Germany group in the Landtag since 2022.
