= Frank Müller (politician, born 1986) =

German politician (born 1986)

- Müller in 2026

Member of the Landtag of Mecklenburg-Vorpommern
- Assuming office 20 October 2026
- Succeeding: Nadine Julitz
- Constituency: Mecklenburgische Seenplatte III

Personal details
- Born: 1986 (age 39–40)
- Party: Alternative for Germany

Frank Müller (born 1986) is a German politician who was elected member of the Landtag of Mecklenburg-Vorpommern in 2026. He is the group leader of the Alternative for Germany in the city council of Waren (Müritz).
