= Markus Striedl =

German politician (born 1980)

Member of the Landtag of Bavaria
- Incumbent
- Assumed office 30 October 2023
- Constituency: Swabia

Personal details
- Born: 19 February 1980 (age 46)
- Party: Alternative for Germany (since 2016)

Markus Striedl (born 19 February 1980) is a German politician serving as a member of the Landtag of Bavaria since 2023. He has been a regional councillor of Swabia since 2018. From 2020 to 2023, he was a city councillor of Augsburg.
