= Marc Vallendar =

German politician (born 1986)

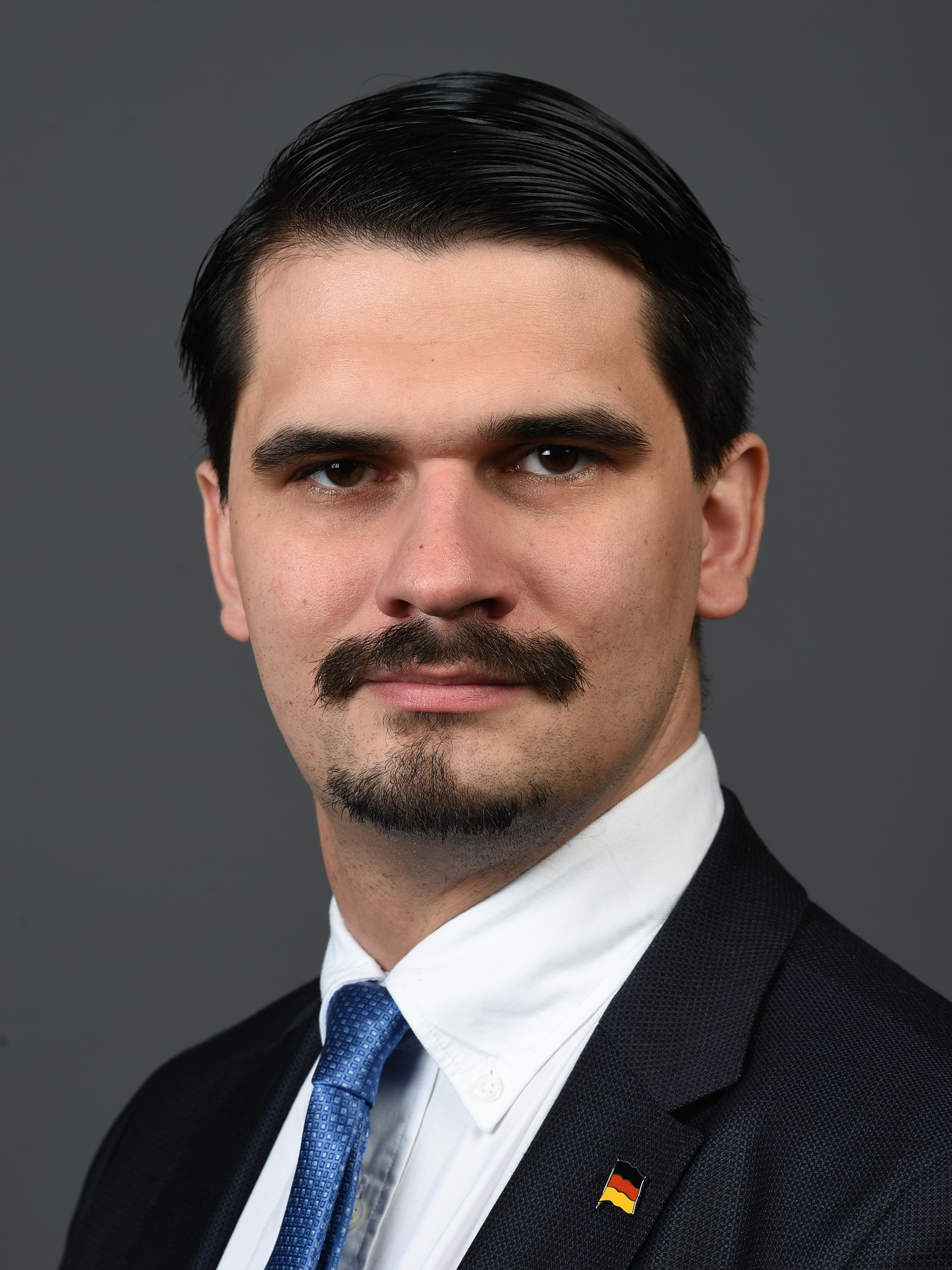
- Vallendar in 2017

Member of the Abgeordnetenhaus of Berlin
- Incumbent
- Assumed office 18 September 2016

Personal details
- Born: 28 June 1986 (age 39) Münster
- Party: Alternative for Germany (since 2013)
- Other political affiliations: Free Democratic Party (2007–2013)

Marc Vallendar (born 28 June 1986 in Münster) is a German politician serving as a member of the Abgeordnetenhaus of Berlin since 2016. He has been a member of the Alternative for Germany since 2013, and was a member of the Free Democratic Party from 2007 to 2013.
