= Dennis Möhring =

German politician (born 1976)

Member of the Landtag of Saxony-Anhalt
- Assuming office 6 October 2026
- Succeeding: Ulrich Thomas
- Constituency: Quedlinburg

Personal details
- Born: 1976 (age 49–50)
- Party: Alternative for Germany (since 2017)

Dennis Möhring (born 1976) is a German politician who was elected member of the Landtag of Saxony-Anhalt in 2026. He has served as chairman of the Alternative for Germany in Harz since 2025.
