= Andreas Winhart =

German politician (born 1983)

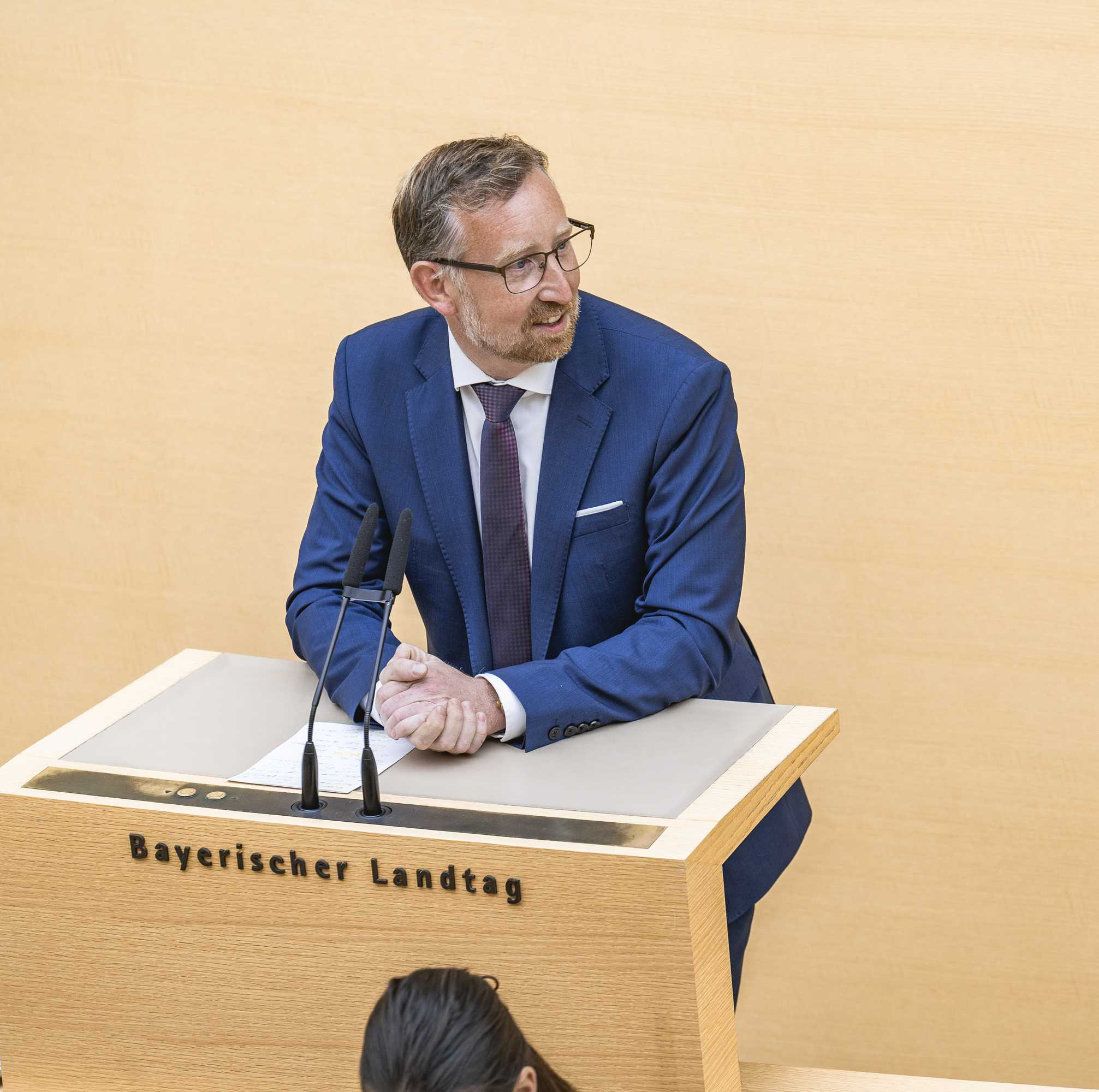
- Winhart in 2024

Member of the Landtag of Bavaria
- Incumbent
- Assumed office 5 November 2018
- Constituency: Upper Bavaria

Personal details
- Born: 25 May 1983 (age 42) Rosenheim
- Party: Alternative for Germany (since 2015)

Andreas Winhart (born 25 May 1983 in Rosenheim) is a German politician serving as a member of the Landtag of Bavaria since 2018. He has served as chairman of the Alternative for Germany in Rosenheim since 2018.
