= Dimitri Schulz =

German politician (born 1987)

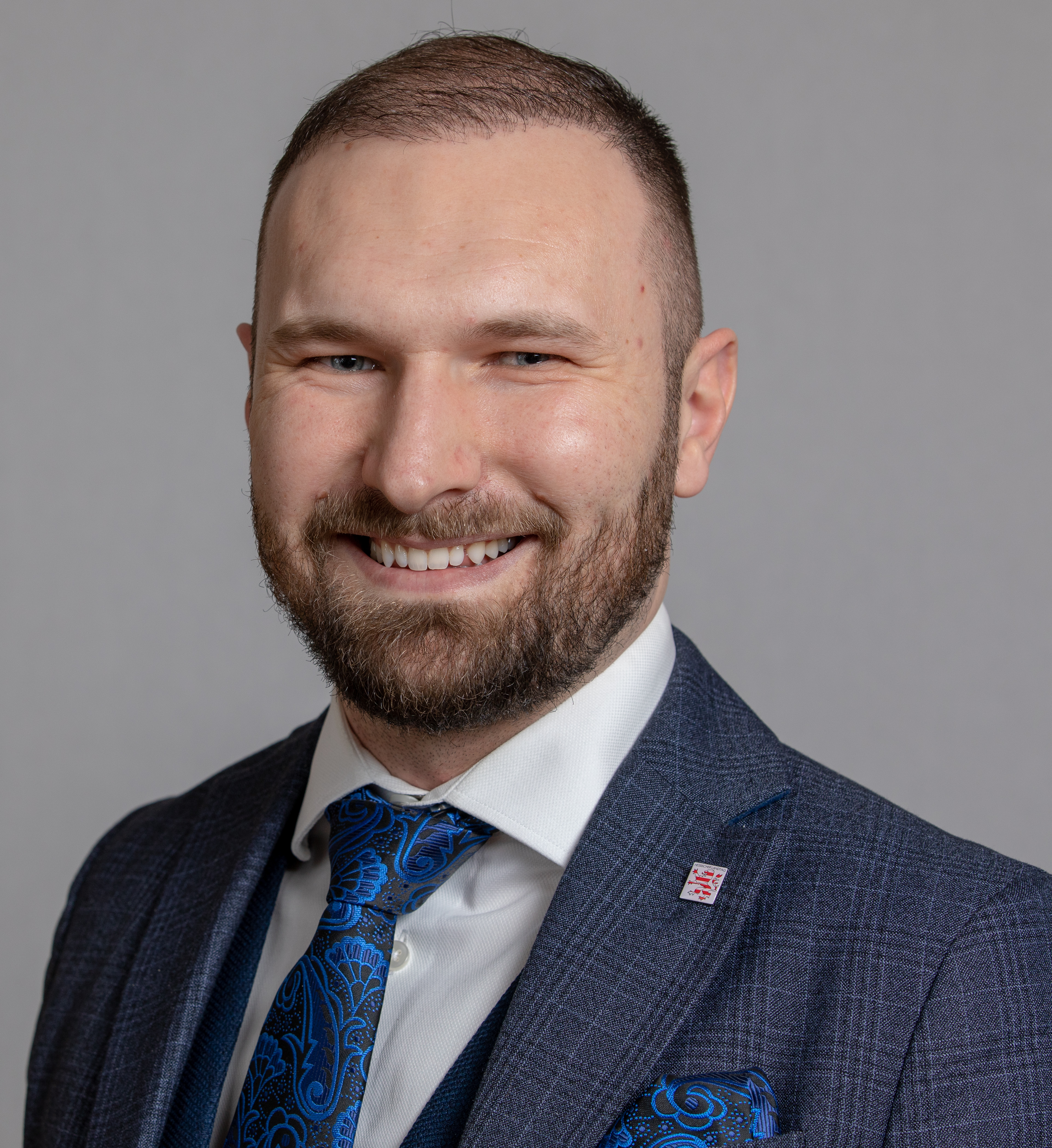
- Schulz in 2019

Member of the Landtag of Hesse
- Incumbent
- Assumed office 18 January 2019

Personal details
- Born: 14 February 1987 (age 39)
- Party: Alternative for Germany (since 2014)

Dimitri Schulz (born 14 February 1987) is a Soviet-born German politician serving as a member of the Landtag of Hesse since 2019. He has been a member of the Alternative for Germany since 2014.
