= Ulrich Singer =

German politician (born 1976)

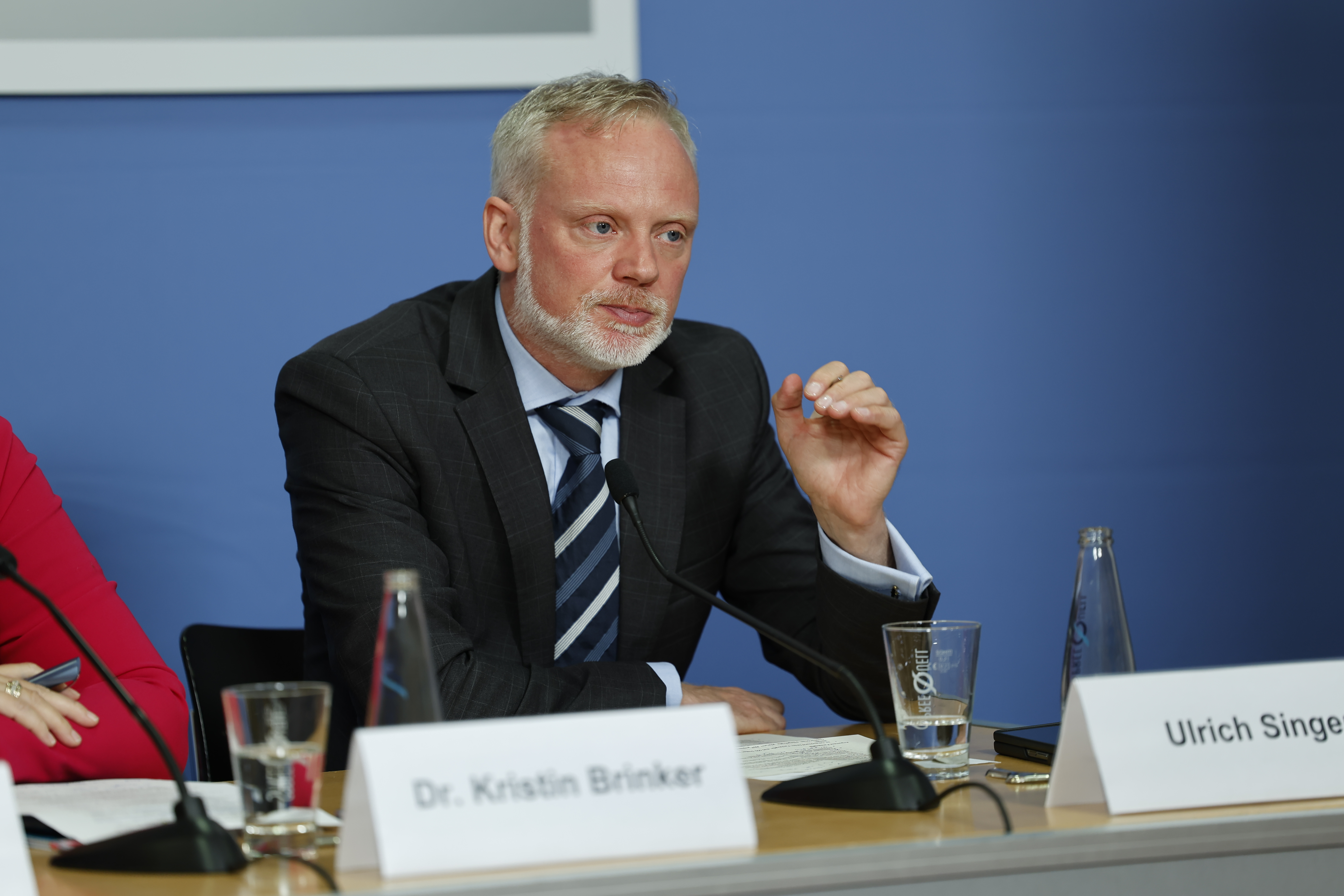
- Singer in 2023

Member of the Landtag of Bavaria
- Incumbent
- Assumed office 5 November 2018
- Constituency: Swabia

Personal details
- Born: 18 June 1976 (age 49)
- Party: Alternative for Germany (since 2016)

Ulrich Singer (born 18 June 1976 in Munich) is a German politician serving as a member of the Landtag of Bavaria since 2018. From 2021 to 2023, he served as group leader of the Alternative for Germany.
