= Robert Schnell =

German politician (born 1987)

Member of the Landtag of Mecklenburg-Vorpommern
- Incumbent
- Assumed office 20 October 2026

Personal details
- Born: 1987 (age 38–39)
- Party: Alternative for Germany

Robert Schnell (born 1987) is a German politician who was elected member of the Landtag of Mecklenburg-Vorpommern in 2026. He has served as group leader of the Alternative for Germany in the district council of Mecklenburgische Seenplatte since 2020. From 2016 to 2022, he served as chairman of the Young Alternative for Germany in Mecklenburg-Vorpommern.
