= Gereon Bollmann =

German politician (born 1953)

Gereon Bollmann (born 20 November 1953) is a German politician for the AfD and since 2021 member of the Bundestag, the federal diet.

== Life and politics ==
Bollmann was born in the West German town of Au im Murgtal.
