= Udo Stein =

German politician (born 1983)

Member of the Landtag of Baden-Württemberg
- Incumbent
- Assumed office 11 May 2016

Personal details
- Born: 22 February 1983 (age 43)
- Party: Alternative for Germany

Udo Stein (born 22 February 1983) is a German politician serving as a member of the Landtag of Baden-Württemberg since 2016. He has served as deputy group leader of the Alternative for Germany since 2023.
