= Knuth Meyer-Soltau =

German politician (born 1965)

Member of the Bundestag
- Incumbent
- Assumed office 25 March 2025
- Constituency: North Rhine-Westphalia

Personal details
- Born: 13 March 1965 (age 61)
- Party: Alternative for Germany (since 2016)

Knuth Meyer-Soltau (born 13 March 1965) is a German politician who was elected as a member of the Bundestag in 2025. He has been a member of the Alternative for Germany since 2016.

== Early life and education ==
Knuth Meyer-Soltau was born on March 13, 1965, in Diepholz, Lower Saxony, and was raised in Hamburg-Neugraben. He attended the Realschule in Hamburg-Fischbek before transferring to the Lessing-Gymnasium in Hamburg-Harburg. After completing his school education, he studied legal science and passed his state law examinations in 1993 and 1997.

== Legal career ==
Meyer-Soltau has practiced law as a self-employed lawyer in Bochum since he was admitted to the bar in 1998. He is a certified specialist in criminal law (Fachanwalt für Strafrecht). Prior to his election to federal office, he served as a legal consultant for the AfD parliamentary group in the Landtag of North Rhine-Westphalia. He is also known for his legal work within the "Fan-Kurvenrecht" network, representing football supporters in criminal proceedings.

== Political career ==
Meyer-Soltau has been a member of the Alternative for Germany (AfD) since 2016. In the 2025 German federal election, he was elected to the Bundestag representing the constituency of Bochum I via the North Rhine-Westphalia state list. Within the parliament, he serves as a member of the Committee on Legal Affairs (specifically the subcommittee on Consumer Protection) and the Petitions Committee.

== Personal life ==
Meyer-Soltau is married and has two children. He identifies as non-denominational (konfessionslos).
