= Thorsten Weiß =

German politician (born 1983)

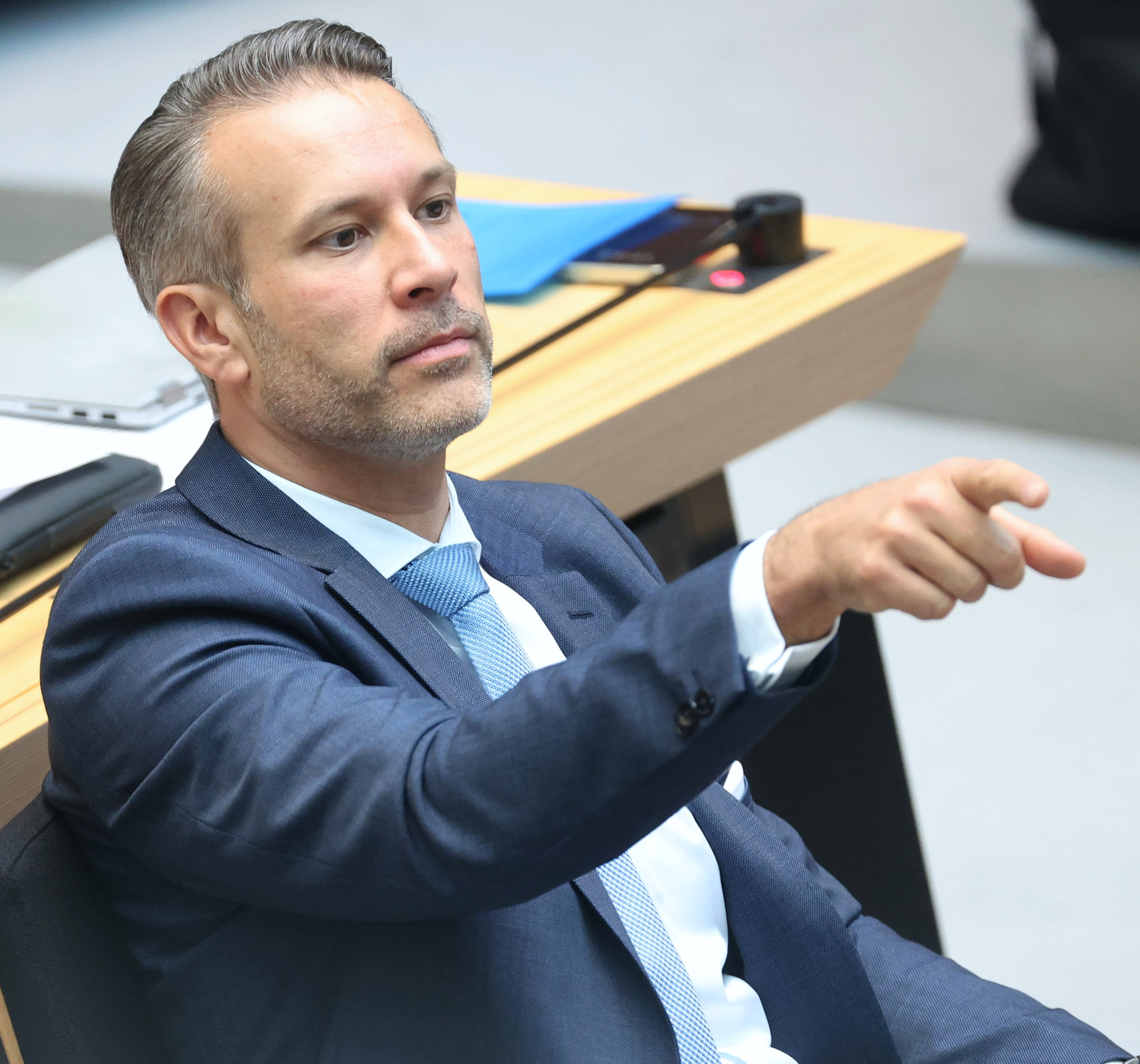
- Weiß in 2024

Member of the Abgeordnetenhaus of Berlin
- Incumbent
- Assumed office 27 October 2016

Personal details
- Born: 13 October 1983 (age 42) Berlin
- Party: Alternative for Germany (since 2014)

Thorsten Weiß (born 13 October 1983 in Berlin) is a German politician from the right-wing Alternative for Germany (AfD) party serving as a member of the Abgeordnetenhaus of Berlin since 2016. From 2014 to 2017, he served as chairman of the Young Alternative for Germany in Berlin.
