= Matthias Vogler =

German politician (born 1981)

Member of the Landtag of Bavaria
- Incumbent
- Assumed office 30 October 2023
- Constituency: Middle Franconia

Personal details
- Born: 30 October 1981 (age 44)
- Party: Alternative for Germany (since 2016)

Matthias Vogler (born 30 October 1981) is a German politician serving as a member of the Landtag of Bavaria since 2023. From 2018 to 2021, he served as chairman of the Alternative for Germany in Nuremberg and Schwabach.
