= Christian Rohde =

German politician (born 1988)

Member of the Landtag of Hesse
- Incumbent
- Assumed office 18 January 2024

Personal details
- Born: 19 September 1988 (age 37) Frankfurt am Main
- Party: Alternative for Germany

Christian Rohde (born 19 September 1988 in Frankfurt am Main) is a German politician serving as a member of the Landtag of Hesse since 2024. He has been a district councillor of the Wetteraukreis since 2019, and a city councillor of Karben since 2022.
