= Marc Bernicke =

German politician (born 1995)

Member of the Berlin House of Representatives
- Incumbent
- Assumed office 29 October 2026

Personal details
- Born: 1995 (age 30–31)
- Party: Alternative for Germany (since 2017)

Marc-Philipp Bernicke (born 1995) is a German politician who was elected member of the Berlin House of Representatives in 2026. He has served as managing director of AfD Berlin since 2021.
