= Enxhi Seli-Zacharias =

German politician (born 1993)

Member of the Landtag of North Rhine-Westphalia
- Incumbent
- Assumed office 1 June 2022

Personal details
- Born: 29 September 1993 (age 33) Tirana, Albania
- Party: Alternative for Germany
- Education: University of Duisburg-Essen

Enxhi Seli-Zacharias (born 29 September 1993) is an Albanian-born German politician who has been a member of the Landtag of North Rhine-Westphalia since 2022. She is a deputy leader of the Alternative for Germany (AfD) parliamentary group in the Landtag.

== Early life and education ==
Seli-Zacharias was born in Tirana, Albania, and moved to Gelsenkirchen with her family as a child. She studied political science at the University of Duisburg-Essen, graduating with a bachelor's degree. She subsequently acquired German citizenship.

== Political career ==
Before entering the Landtag, Seli-Zacharias worked for the AfD's council group in Wiesbaden and as an adviser on schools and education to its North Rhine-Westphalia parliamentary group. She has been deputy leader of the AfD group on Gelsenkirchen's city council since 2020. Her Landtag mandate began on 1 June 2022. She serves as her parliamentary group's spokesperson on the committees for integration and for equality and women's affairs, and on the parliamentary inquiry into the August 2024 Solingen attack.

In December 2025, she told ZDF that the Solingen inquiry should focus on preventing future attacks and suggested that its work was being deliberately delayed. The ministry responsible for refugee affairs said it was providing the records requested by the committee. In July 2026, she was selected for second place on the AfD's state list for the 2027 North Rhine-Westphalia election.

=== Parliamentary staffing ===
In February 2026, dpa reported that Seli-Zacharias employed the wife of an AfD municipal politician from Duisburg. She defended the appointment, noting that the woman's husband was not a member of the Landtag. A parliamentary spokesperson said the administration knew of no breaches of the rule prohibiting members from employing another Landtag member's spouse.

An August 2026 investigation by MDR, published by tagesschau.de, reported that she employed 15 staff and had not answered questions about their work. The report noted that the maximum reimbursement for parliamentary staff costs was independent of the number of employees.

== Political positions ==
=== Immigration and integration ===
In a February 2025 interview with EenVandaag, Seli-Zacharias called for border closures and "remigration", including the return of migrants with criminal records who were living in Germany illegally. She described naturalisation requirements as too lenient and unfair to earlier immigrants, including herself, who had met previous requirements.

In a Landtag debate that month, she criticised a charter flight transferring seven people to Bulgaria under the Dublin procedure as a publicity exercise by integration minister Josefine Paul. Paul rejected the allegation and said the arrangements with Bulgaria permitted no more than ten people per flight.

Commenting on unrest in Belfast in June 2026, Seli-Zacharias wrote on X that civil war had already begun and called on British men to rise up. She told WDR that, in her view, violence by migrants could lead to civil war in European countries unless governments responded.

=== Islam and education ===
Seli-Zacharias told Die Welt that the AfD's position that Islam does not belong to Germany was a principal reason for joining the party. She rejected descriptions of the party as hostile to migrants, citing her family background.

In a September 2024 Landtag debate following the Solingen attack, she said that Islam had come to signify submission rather than peace in German society. In May 2025, she co-signed an AfD motion calling for a ban on headscarves for girls under 14 in North Rhine-Westphalian schools and discussions with other states about extending such a ban to public childcare facilities and schools nationwide.

In September 2025, she criticised what she described as preferential childcare provision for Roma families in Gelsenkirchen, criticised halal school meals, and called for greater emphasis on German-language teaching.

== Public controversies ==
=== Street-cleaning video ===
In June 2026, Seli-Zacharias posted a video showing her and other AfD politicians calling on migrant residents, particularly Sinti and Roma, to sweep streets in Gelsenkirchen-Ückendorf. In the video, she said that the residents should leave the city. She told WDR that the cleaning had been voluntary and that the video was intended to draw attention to local conditions. Residents and witnesses interviewed by the broadcaster described pressure and intimidation.

In an accompanying Instagram post, she described residents as "bloodsuckers of our welfare state" and called for what she termed "Roma villages" to disappear. She rejected accusations of anti-Roma prejudice. Romani Rose, chairman of the Central Council of German Sinti and Roma, condemned the incident as racist.

On 11 June 2026, WDR reported that a North Rhine-Westphalian Sinti and Roma organisation had filed a criminal complaint alleging incitement to hatred. CORRECTIV reported that police had referred material concerning possible incitement and coercion in connection with the video and associated comments to Cologne prosecutors, who were reviewing whether to open their own investigation.

On 9 July 2026, Gelsenkirchen's city council removed Norbert Emmerich, who had participated in the video, from his position as second mayor. Seli-Zacharias described the backlash against her and the AfD as a "witch hunt" by the media and other parties.

=== Publication of defendants' names ===
In July 2026, WDR reported that Seli-Zacharias had published the names of two defendants in a child sexual abuse case at Essen's regional court. Their lawyers filed criminal complaints against her. She defended the publication, arguing that people who abused their own children had forfeited their right to protection. A defence lawyer said that publishing the names also made the child victims easier to identify.

== July 2026 firecracker incident ==
On 28 July 2026, firecrackers were thrown towards a car outside Seli-Zacharias's home in Gelsenkirchen. No injuries or property damage were reported. The following day, police said that a 16-year-old had admitted involvement and that two other teenage suspects had been identified. According to WDR's report of 29 July, police no longer considered the incident to be politically motivated.
