= Elena Roon =

German politician (born 1977)

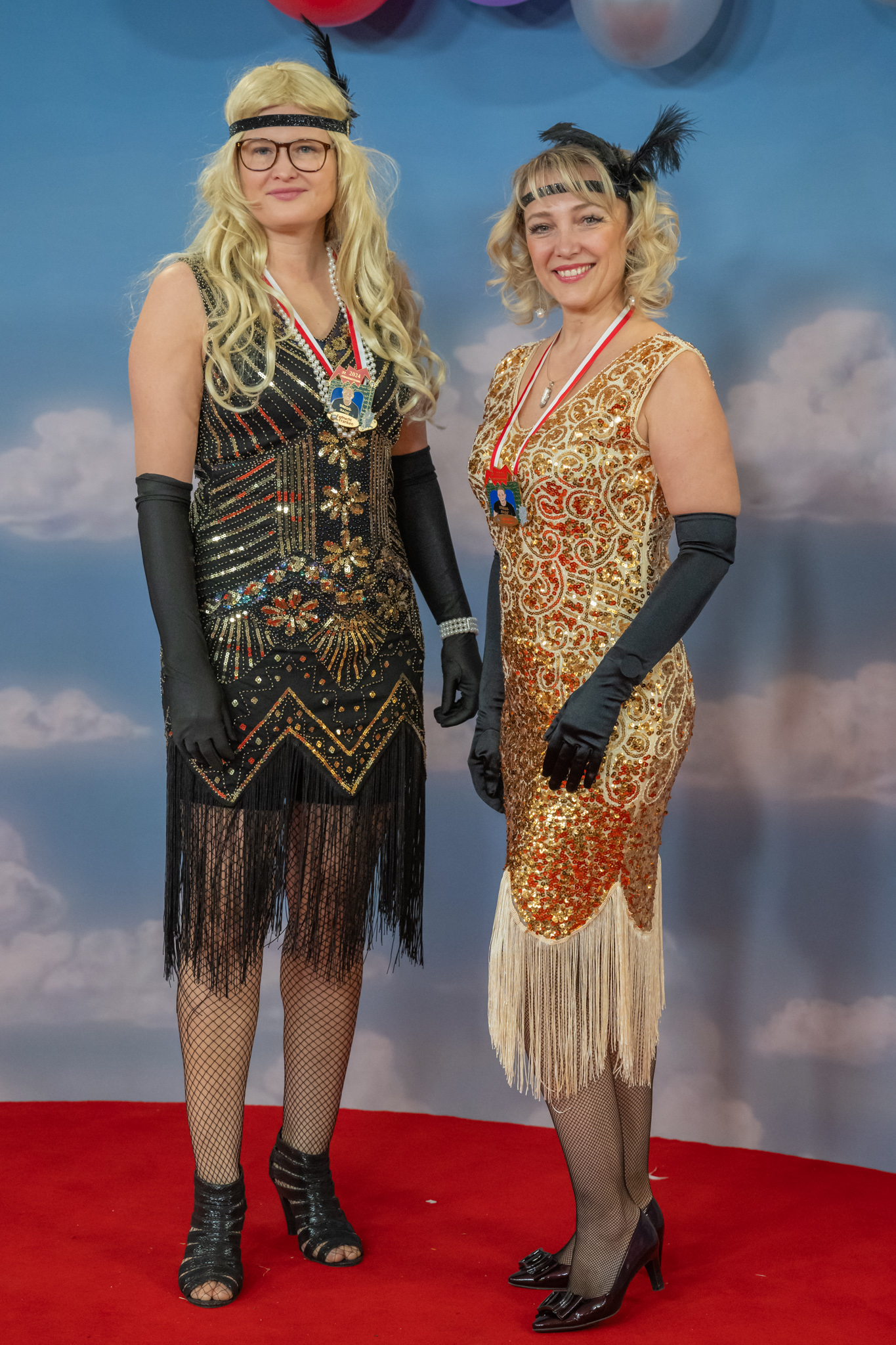
- Roon in 2024

Member of the Landtag of Bavaria
- Incumbent
- Assumed office 30 October 2023
- Constituency: Middle Franconia

Personal details
- Born: 1977 (age 48–49) Satbayev
- Party: Alternative for Germany (since 2014)

Elena Roon (born 1977) is a Soviet-born German politician serving as a member of the Landtag of Bavaria since 2023. From 2019 to 2023, she was a regional councillor of Middle Franconia. Roon is associated with the far-right of the party and has interacted right-wing Russia German groups, including being a member of an online group associated with the ARMINIUS-Bund. She also caused controversy in 2017 after sharing a Hitler meme in a private chat group.
