= Adam Balten =

German politician (born 1983)

Member of the Bundestag
- Incumbent
- Assumed office March 2025
- Constituency: North Rhine-Westphalia

Personal details
- Born: 1983 (age 42–43)
- Party: Alternative for Germany (since 2021)
- Other political affiliations: Young Union (until 2015)

Adam Peter Balten (born 1983 in Sosnowiec, Poland) is a German politician who was elected as a member of the Bundestag in 2025. He has been a member of the Alternative for Germany since 2021, and was a member of the Young Union until 2015.

Balten moved from Poland to Germany with his parents at the age of five. He speak Polish language fluently and his ties to his birth country are still close. He often visited his grandparents and family in Poland.
