= Hans-Olaf Henkel =

German politician (born 1940)

Hans-Olaf Henkel MEP
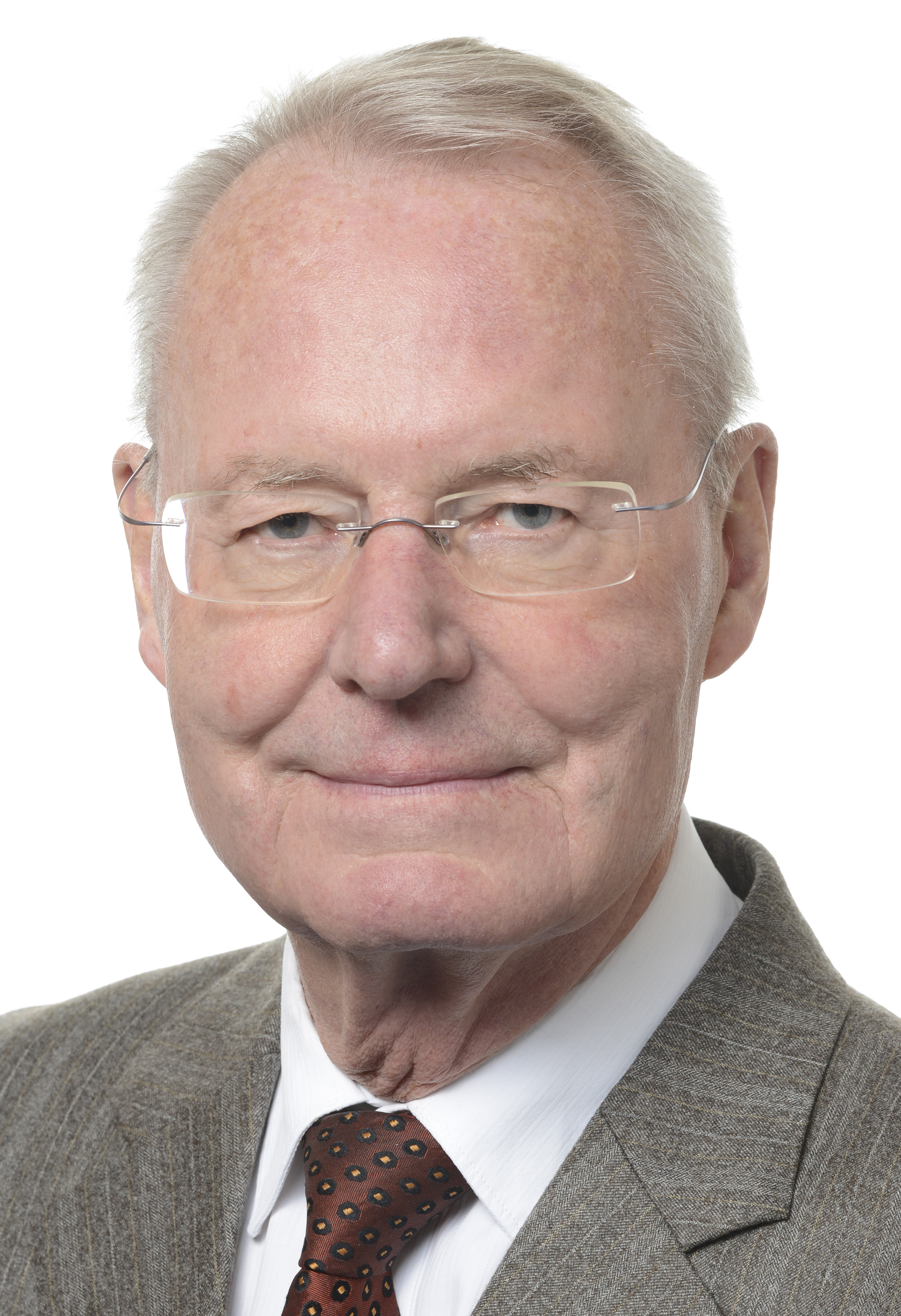
- Henkel in 2014

Vice-Chair of the European Conservatives and Reformists German Delegation
- Incumbent
- Assumed office 12 June 2014
- Chairman: Syed Kamall
- Serving alongside: Ryszard Legutko; Raffaele Fitto; Roberts Zīle; Helga Stevens; Geoffrey Van Orden
- Preceded by: New office

Member of the European Parliament
- In office 1 July 2014 – 2 July 2019
- Constituency: Germany

Personal details
- Born: Hans-Olaf Henkel; 9 March 1940 (age 86) Hamburg, German Reich
- Party: EU; European Conservatives and Reformists; German none
- Other political affiliations: Alternative for Germany Liberal Conservative Reformers
- Spouse: Marlene (divorce 2004) Bettina Hannover (m. 2005)
- Children: 4
- Education: University of Berlin
- Website: www.hansolafhenkel.de

Hans-Olaf Henkel (born 14 March 1940) is a German politician, a Member of the European Parliament (MEP) from Germany and a publicist. He was formerly a manager at IBM, president of the Federation of German Industries (BDI) and president of the Leibniz Association. After decades as a political observer, he was elected to the European Parliament in 2014 for the AfD (Alternative für Deutschland). In response to the election of Frauke Petry as the new federal chairman in July 2015, he resigned from the AfD. He is now an independent member of the European Conservatives and Reformists.

== Life and career ==
Hans-Olaf Henkel was born and raised in Hamburg. He studied at the Akademie für Gemeinwirtschaft, which merged as Universität für Wirtschaft und Politik (HWP) with Hamburg University in 2005. Henkel joined IBM Germany in 1962. From September 1993 to December 1994 he was head of IBM Europe, Middle East and Africa with his office in Paris. From 1995 to 2000 he was the president of the Federation of German Industries (BDI).

He was president of the Leibniz Association from 2001 to 2005. Henkel is also a board member of the Deutscher Familienverband (German family association).

Until 2013 Henkel was a member of the supervisory board of Bayer AG, Continental AG, DaimlerChrysler Aerospace, Ringier AG and other companies. He resigned from these positions to join the Alternative for Germany in 2014, which he left again in 2015. Since November 2000 he is a Professor of International Management at the University of Mannheim.

In November 2010, Henkel suggested in an article in the German magazine FOCUS to split the Eurozone into two currencies, a northern and a southern one, which received a lot of attention. In 2011 he proposed in an article in the Financial Times, that "Austria, Finland, Germany and the Netherlands should leave the eurozone" and "create a new currency leaving the euro where it is".

Henkel received an Honorary Doctor's degree from the Technical University of Dresden. The WWF named him "Environmental Manager of the Year". As author of numerous publications he received among other awards the international writer's award "Corine".

Currently, he is on the industry and investment panel of the think tank OMFIF's advisory board, where he is regularly involved in meetings regarding the financial and monetary system.

== Commitment to human rights ==
Hans-Olaf Henkel has been a member of the Amnesty International (AI) human rights organization since 1996, and he has been donating to the organization all the income raised from the publication of his books for many years. On the occasion of his 60th birthday, he also donated 150,000 German marks to Amnesty International with a request "to strengthen the commitment to the rights of women, especially in the Islamic world."

In Cuba, Henkel championed the improvement of the human rights situation and in particular the abolition of the death penalty. He met regularly for discussions with Fidel Castro. The dialogue with Castro broke off in 2003 when he arrested 75 dissidents and executed three. Henkel protested strongly against this practice.

Henkel campaigned for the persecuted Chinese artist Ai Weiwei and initiated in 2011 the "Berliner Appell", which required the release of the artist then detained at an unknown location. In this context, Henkel criticized what he considered to be a low commitment to human rights and democracy in China of German companies.

In his commitment to human rights and democracy, Henkel is convinced that free trade and the market economy inevitably improve the human rights and democratic rights of a country.

== Works (selection) ==
- Henkel, Hans-Olaf (2010). Rettet unser Geld! (in German). München: Heyne. ISBN 978-3-453-18284-4.
- —— (2009). Die Abwracker (in German). München: Heyne. ISBN 978-3-453-16829-9.
- —— (2007). Der Kampf um die Mitte: mein Bekenntnis zum Bürgertum (in German). München: Droemer. ISBN 978-3-426-27423-1.
- —— (2002). Die Ethik des Erfolgs (in German). München: Econ-Verl. ISBN 978-3-430-14286-1.
- —— (2002). Die Macht der Freiheit (in German). München: Econ-Verl. ISBN 978-3-548-75077-4.

== Awards ==
- 1991 Award of the "Karmarsch-Denkmünze" of the Leibniz Universitätsgesellschaft Hannover e.V.
- 1992 Honorary doctorate from the Technical University of Dresden
- 1992 "Environmental Manager of the Year" magazine Capital and WWF Germany
- 1992 Innovation Award of the German Economy of the magazine "Wirtschaftswoche"
- 1995 "Dinosaur of the Year" awarded by the German Nature Conservation Union
- 1998 "Order of the Southern Cross" by the President of Brazil
- 1999 "Order of the Sacred Treasure" by the Emperor of Japan
- 2000 "Commandeur" of the French Legion of Honour
- 2001 Cicero-Speaker Award ("Best Speaker Economy")
- In 2002, Henkel refused to accept the Federal Cross of Merit for reasons of Hanseatic tradition (→ Hanseatic League and awards)
- 2003 International Book Prize Corine for the book "Die Ethik des Erfolgs"
- 2003 Ludwig Erhard Prize for Business Journalism
- 2006 German SME Award of the market intern-publisher "because of his opposition to compulsory membership of medium-sized enterprises in the chambers of industry and commerce"
- 2007 He was awarded with the Friedrich A. von Hayek medal
- Henkel received the New York Programming Award for his Sunday jazz program on Berlin's jazz radio 101.9.
- From 2007 to 2013, the Leibniz Association awarded the "Hans Olaf Henkel Prize – Prize for Science Policy" every two years, an award for outstanding achievements in the promotion of science in Germany. In addition, the butterfly species Bracca olafhenkeli was named after him.
