= Ulrike Trebesius =

German politician (born 1970)

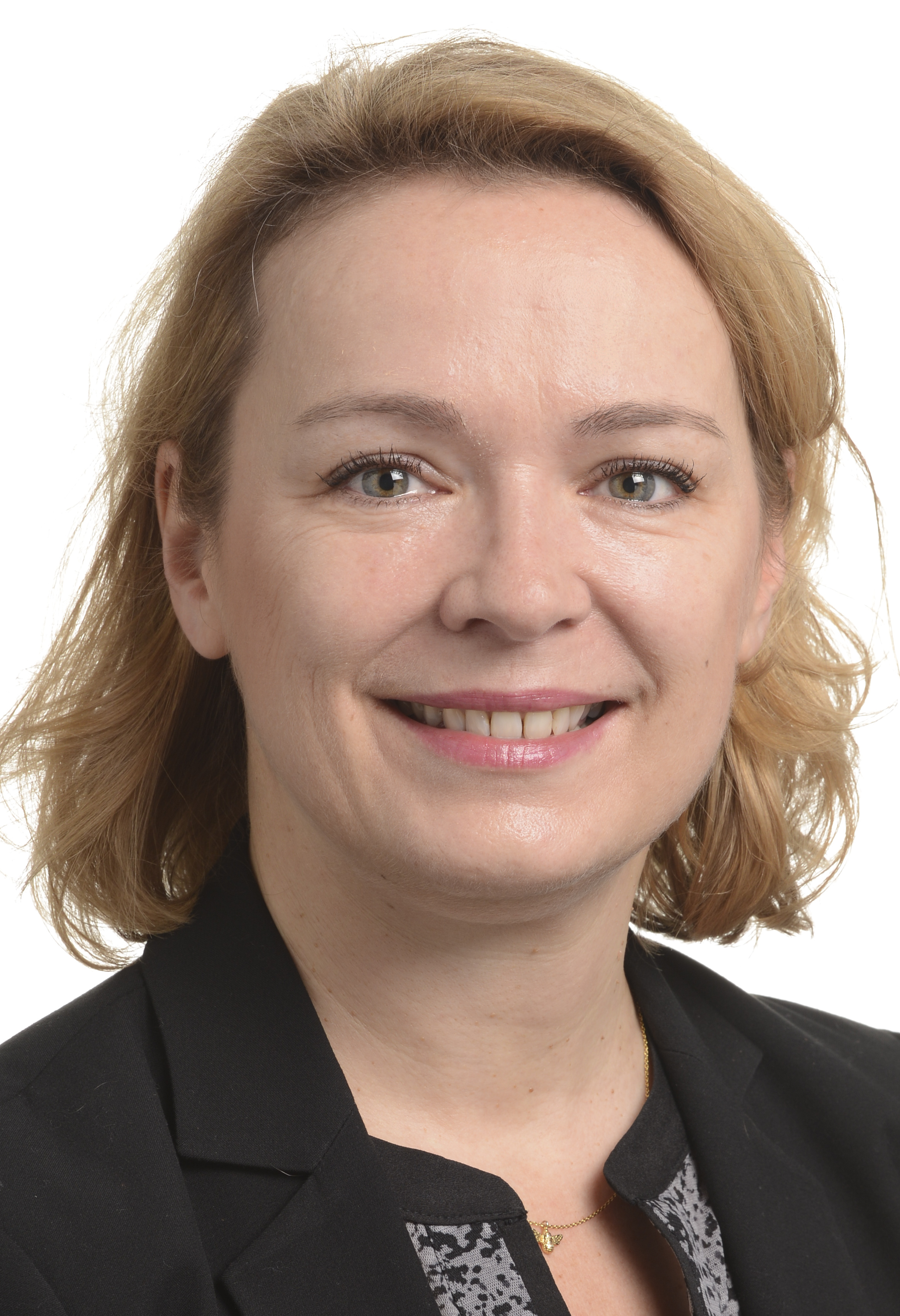

Member of the European Parliament
- In office 2014–2019
- Constituency: Germany

Personal details
- Born: 17 April 1970 (age 55) Halle (Saale), Germany
- Party: German; Alternative for Germany

Ulrike Trebesius (born 17 April 1970) is a German politician. From 2014 until 2019, she served as Member of the European Parliament (MEP) representing Germany.

From the 19 of January, 2017 the 1 of July, 2019 she was part of the Committee on Employment and Social Affairs on the European Parliament. One of her main debates was on Gender Balance in appointments for monetary affairs at the EU level.
