= Martin Rothweiler =

German politician (born 1978)

Member of the Landtag of Baden-Württemberg
- Incumbent
- Assumed office 11 May 2026

Personal details
- Born: 15 April 1978 (age 47)
- Party: Alternative for Germany (since 2013)

Martin Rothweiler (born 15 April 1978) is a German politician who was elected member of the Landtag of Baden-Württemberg in 2026. He has been designated to serve as group leader of the Alternative for Germany.
