= AfD pro-Russia movement =

Parts of the Alternative for Germany party that support Russia

AfD pro-Russia movement AfD-Bewegung pro Russland
- Ideology: Russophilia
- National affiliation: Alternative for Germany

The Alternative for Germany (AfD) political party has been positioning itself for years in favour of close cooperation with Russia, while the European Union is viewed with skepticism or even hostility. As early as 2013, and before the Annexation of Crimea (2014), Alexander Gauland wrote a paper expressing understanding for Russia's desire to regain Crimea from Ukraine and comparing the loss of "holy Kyiv" to the loss of Cologne for Germany. He argued that Bismarck's Reinsurance Treaty should be a guideline: "Our relationship with Russia should always be worth carefully cultivating. We Germans sometimes forget that Russia played a positive role at key milestones in German history and saved Prussia from ruin."

The German domestic secret service reported based on its findings that Russia is trying to destabilize the democratic system of Germany on many levels. According to the head of the service Thomas Haldenwang, Russian narratives are being spread by parts of the AfD and are contributing to expansion of right-wing extremism.

AfD members and activists were listed as keeping close ties with Russian politicians and receiving financial benefits in an OCCRP investigation of Russia's International Agency for Current Policy.

In 2023 various German media outlets such as Der Spiegel, ARD, Süddeutsche Zeitung, Die Welt, ZDF Frontal, T-Online, and Correctiv have published findings on the AfD's connections with Russia. Based on manifestos, trips, quotes and speeches, the "AfD's systematic shift" (Correctiv) towards Russia has been widely observed.

In 2025, Tim Schramm, a 22-year old deputy chairman of AfD district association in Wuppertal, was found to have volunteered in the Ukrainian Army in 2024, and subsequently expelled from the party.

== Positions ==
=== Russian occupation of Crimea ===
Former Bundestag member Waldemar Herdt considers the Russian Crimea referendum to be legitimate, denying any occupation. During the 2018 Russian presidential election, seven AfD members visited Russian-occupied Crimea as observers.

=== Russian occupation of Donbas ===
In March 2019, then party co-leader Alexander Gauland said in an interview with the Russian newspaper Komsomolskaya Pravda that they consider the war in Donbas to be a Ukrainian internal matter, and that Germany should not get involved in the internal affairs of Ukraine or Russia. He also said the AfD is against international sanctions imposed on Russia.

In September 2022, the three state parliament members Christian Blex, Hans-Thomas Tillschneider and Daniel Wald traveled to Russia and also wanted to visit the Russian-occupied Donbas in eastern Ukraine. After criticism from the German public, they canceled the trip.

In August 2023 The Insider and Der Spiegel published a joint investigation into actions of Russian citizen Vladimir Sergienko who proxied money and instructions from Russia to AfD politicians, who filed a constitutional complaint in Germany against its supplies of weapons to Ukraine. Sergienko coordinated a number of other AfD initiatives, such as sending letters to the Pope and drafting an anti-Ukrainian declaration of Harald Weyel in PACE.

== Media ==
The Russian state foreign media agency RT has had a German speaking outlet since 2014, which spread right wing conspiracy theories and several times promoted AfD-politicians and their positions. Often German AfD politicians got interviewed in the German and International RT programs. The daily show The Missing Part ("Der fehlende Part") with which RT claims to broadcast "what others do not say, what others do not show". RT invites such guests as AfD supporter Ken Jebsen, a journalist who was kicked out of public broadcaster rbb after antisemitic charges had been raised against him. RT DE was reporting intensively about pro-Russian Berlin Monday demonstrations, which are closely linked to the right-wing populist publicist Jürgen Elsässer, editor-in-chief of Compact. Compact has also been described as the de facto voice of AfD. In addition, troll and bot accounts with Russian backgrounds promote the party on social media.

=== "Voice of Europe"-Platform ===
In March 2024, several European intelligence services under the leadership of the Czech Service uncovered Russia's largest known influence operations on European politics with "Voice of Europe". According to the Czech government, the Internet and social media news platform "Voice of Europe" based in Prague, Czech Republic is the un-hidden part of the pro-Russia influencing operation. The platform operated behind the facade of a reputable news portal, primarily reporting on topics that were convenient for the Russian government, demonstrations against Western governments or disputes over the costs of migration. The oligarch and Putin profiteer Viktor Medvedchuk covertly finances the operation and network. The Platform had also the aim of questioning the territorial integrity, sovereignty and freedom of Ukraine. The site published statements from politicians calling on the EU to stop supporting Ukraine. Long interviews are published on the site, primarily with right-wing politicians. Several German AfD politicians have their say: Maximilian Krah and Petr Bystron, who are in first and second place on the AfD list for the 2024 European elections. Articles from other media were adopted, in particular from Compact and Unser Mitteleuropa as well as the AfD-member-magazine Deutschland-Kurier. In addition to articles in German, articles also appeared in fourteen other languages.

European politicians who worked with the news site were paid several hundred thousand euros with Russian money, Denník N reported. In some cases, the money also financed their election campaigns for the 2024 European elections. When the politicians visited Prague, the money was handed over to the politicians in cash. Other money was paid out in cryptocurrencies. AfD politicians from Germany and other right-wing radical politicians from Belgium, France, Hungary, the Netherlands and Poland received payments. When asked by Der Spiegel, Maximilian Krah denied that he himself had received money from "Voice of Europe". Petr Bystron has so far left a request unanswered.

The Czech Foreign Ministry put those behind the platform on the sanctions list.

=== SDA ===
In September 2024 intern material of the Moscow-based media agency SDA got leaked to German media. SDA is part of Russia's hybrid warfare against Western states and is considered a central tool for disinformation. As the agency's internal documents show, its work is aimed at unsettling the population in the EU and destabilizing the democratic political system. Right-wing parties, in Germany the AfD should be strengthened. Specifically, a document sets the goal that the AfD should achieve approval of 20 percent - from a survey institute whose results are published throughout Europe and which is considered trustworthy.

== Initiatives and networks ==
=== Vadar ===
AfD politicians Eugen Schmidt, Olga Petersen, and Ulrich Oehme founded the “Association for the Prevention of Discrimination and Exclusion of Russian-Germans and Russian-speaking Fellow Citizens in Germany” (Vadar e.V.) in June 2022. The association attests that Germany has an “anti-Russian mood” and wants to offer legal help to “Russian-Germans and Russian-speaking fellow citizens” who would be discriminated against or excluded by the war of aggression. The association says it financed the legal representation of pro-Russian influencer Alina Lipp and is opposed to the German ban on the Russian military and propaganda symbol Z. The association denies Russian war crimes in the Russo-Ukrainian War.

According to a report in the Sächsische Zeitung, Vadar shares a bank account with an institution that is majority Russian-owned. According to German public broadcaster ARD, German security authorities are investigating the association connections to Russian authorities.

=== International Agency for Current Policy ===
An Organized Crime and Corruption Reporting Project (OCCRP) investigation from February 2023 found evidence that AfD is a key ally for the International Agency for Current Policy, an organization established by Russian parliamentary staffer Sargis Mirzakhanian whose internal documents describe it as a “closed association of professionals" engaged in a variety of pro-Russian activities. These include organizing street protests against NATO, bringing European delegations to Moscow and Crimea, and targeting “national parliaments of the EU” with resolutions to end EU sanctions on Russia and to grant recognition to Russia's annexation of Crimea. Internal emails, including some from Mirzakhanyan, document substantial payments to EU politicians made in exchange for pro-Kremlin motions in their home countries, and to journalist and AfD member Manuel Ochsenreiter for publishing pro-Russian propaganda in his Zuerst! magazine.

== Notable people ==
=== Tino Chrupalla ===
In 2021 Tino Chrupalla (the co-chairman of the AfD) – at the invitation of the Russian Defense Ministry – gave a speech at a conference in which he spoke of the Western Allies' "psychological warfare" right after World War II. He alleged that the Allied victors' reeducation (de) of ordinary Germans after the war had had a lasting impact on the country's national identity. Chrupalla also compared the policies of the Allies after 1945 with Nazi propaganda.

=== Markus Frohnmaier ===
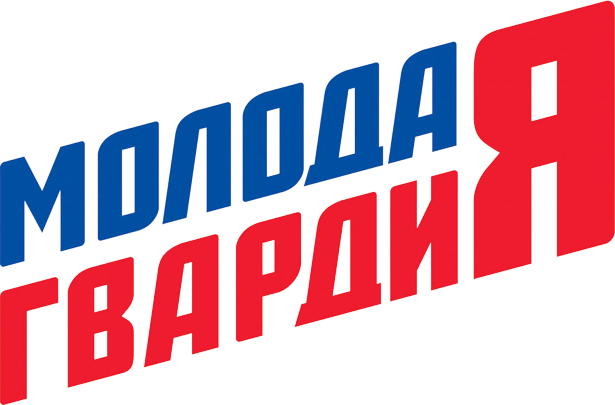
Frohnmaier had meetings with the youth organisation of United Russia "The Young Guards" up from 2016.

Markus Frohnmaier has been an AfD member of the Bundestag since 2017. The public broadcaster ZDF, as well as Spiegel and other media had reported that the Kremlin had specifically supported Frohnmaier to promote Russian interests in the Bundestag. In a strategy paper of the Presidential Administration of Vladimir Putin, which is to come from the time before the general election in 2017, it is said that Frohnmaier "will be under absolute control". Further on "our people could also set up a non-profit organization, which will be registered with the Bundestag and can be promoted through the pro-Russian positions."

=== Udo Hemmelgarn ===
Udo Hemmelgarn has been an AfD member of the Bundestag since 2017. He supported the Assad government of Syria and demanded German support of the Russian involvement there. In 2019 Hemmelgarn organized a secret trip of four AfD members of the Bundestag to Syria. He is a strong supporter of a "new Syria-policy" in the Bundestag. For AfD that meant backing the Assad government and supporting the Russian government.

=== Waldemar Herdt ===
Waldemar Herdt has been an AfD member of the Bundestag from 2017 to 2021. Herdt has regularly appeared on Vladimir Solovyov's and Olga Skabeyeva's shows and has connections to Amram Petrosyan, an associate of the Russian FSB.

=== Steffen Kotré ===
Steffen Kotré has been an AfD member of the Bundestag since 2017. In February 2023, Kotré appeared in a Russian TV show of Vladimir Solovyov. Kotré stated that German mainstream media were doing all they could to turn Germans against Russia; he also criticised German weapon deliveries to Ukraine.

=== Stefan Kreuter ===
Stefan Keuter has been an AfD member of the Bundestag since 2017. He is known for his strong ties to the Russian government. In May 2022 he took part in a conference entitled "Economy against sanctions" with representatives of Russian politics and business. One of the topics discussed was how best to deal with the international sanctions.

=== Robby Schlund ===
Robby Schlund has been an AfD member of the Bundestag since 2017. He delineates himself as a member of the right-wing factional cluster 'Der Flügel' (the wing) around Björn Höcke Under the chairmanship of Robby Schlund, for the first time in years, a German-Russian parliamentary group in 2019 was making efforts to establish better contacts from Germany with Russia.

Schlund is a member of the Russian "Great Brotherhood of Cossack Hosts" organization and is considered to be the ataman of the Bera stanitsa by it. Both he and Waldemar Herdt have connections to Amram Petrosyan, an associate of the Russian FSB, who considers Schlund to be his "dear friend". He and Herdt also have Russian-language pages on VKontakte and Odnoklassniki.

=== Eugen Schmidt ===
Eugen Schmidt has been an AfD member of the Bundestag since 2021. Schmidt was employing Wladimir Sergijenko "as translator and media worker". Sergijenko is a pro-Russian activist in Germany. German magazine Spiegel titled "Moscow's Man in the Bundestag" in 2023. According to a report by Der Spiegel, Western secret services suspected Sergijenko of influencing the AfD on behalf of the Russian government, and of possibly providing the party or its environment with money. In April and June 2023, after Sergijenko had traveled to Russia, German customs found him with 9,000 euros in cash. He denied financially supporting the AfD. Sergijenko's contact in Moscow was a man named "Alexei" and in February 2024 journalist investigation of The Insider confirmed the identity of the person to be Ilya Vechtomov, officer of 5th Service of FSB.

=== Petr Bystron ===
In 2024 joint Czech and German media investigation revealed that Petr Bystron has been receiving funding from a Russian agency Voice of Europe. The party rejected calls for his removal.

=== Olga Petersen ===
Olga Petersen is a founding member of Vadar. In February 2025 she shared pictures of herself traveling along Russian soldiers in Russian-occupied territories of Ukraine.

=== Martin Kühne ===
In August 2023 Martin Kühne, an AfD councillor of Baden-Baden, was charged by prosecutor of defacing two cars with Ukrainian number plates by painting large swastika and "fuck UA" text on them. The incident happened in January and March 2023. After the charges became public Kühne handed his resignation as councillor.

=== Harald Weyel ===
Harald Weyel has been an AfD member of the Bundestag since 2021 and deputy party treasurer. At the beginning of May 2023, a video from Weyel was distributed in which he reported that Russian Orthodox churches in western Ukraine were being attacked. The video was embedded in a pro-Russian campaign on Facebook.

== Literature ==
- A. Shekhovtsov (2017): Russia and the Western far right: Tango Noir. Routledge.
