= Olga Petersen =

German politician (born 1982)

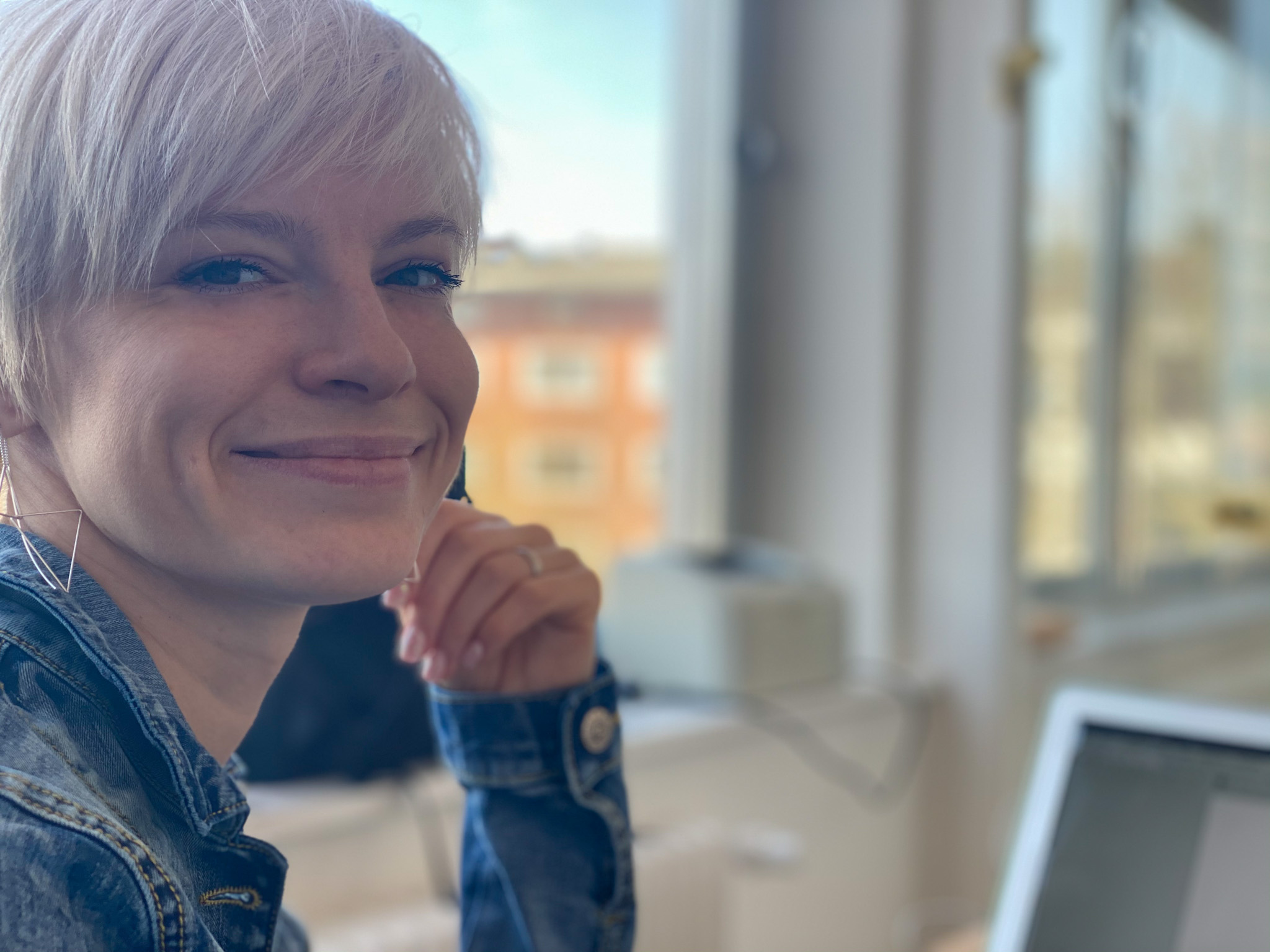
Olga Petersen

Olga Petersen (born 12 September 1982 in Omsk, Russia) is a Russian German politician of the Alternative for Germany (AfD). She is member of Hamburg Parliament.

== Life ==
Olga Petersen was born into a Russian-German family in 1982 in Siberia, which then was then part of the Soviet Union. At the age of 16, she moved to Hamburg with her family. Petersen completed training as a medical assistant. She now lives in Russia.

== Politics ==
Petersen is part of the Pro-Russia movement within AfD. She advocates improving "the bilateral relationship" with Russia. Germany and Russia need a solid relationship based on trust, she said. In July 2023, over a year after Russia's invasion of Ukraine began, Petersen appeared on Russian state television's Russia-1 "60 Minutes" program. The program is moderated by journalist Yevgeny Popov, who is also a member of the Duma for the United Russia party and supports Putin's policies there.

Petersen opposes environmental, nutritional and sexual education at school, "left-wing gender policy", and vaccination obligations. She advocates financial relief for freelance midwives.

In the 2020 Hamburg state elections Petersen was elected to the Bürgerschaft of Hamburg. With 4,018 votes, she achieved the third best result of her party in candidates. Petersen is member of the board of the AfD Hamburg and deputy chair on the district board of Harburg.

In February 2025 she shared pictures of herself traveling along Russian soldiers in Russian-occupied territories of Ukraine.
