= Compact (German magazine) =

German far-right magazine

- August 8, 2026 issue
- Editor-in-Chief: Jürgen Elsässer
- Editor: Daniell Pföhringer
- Categories: Politics
- Frequency: Monthly
- Publisher: Compact-Magazin GmbH
- Founder: Jürgen Elsässer, Kai Homilius, Andreas Abu Bakr Rieger
- Founded: 2010
- Based in: Falkensee, Germany
- Language: German
- Website: compact-online.de
- OCLC: 724419039

Compact (stylized COMPACT, published with the subtitle "Magazine for Sovereignty" (German: Magazin für Souveränität) since October 2013) is a German media outlet, based on a monthly magazine. Compact is a popular magazine of the far-right in Germany. It united different right-wing political milieus through strategic topic setting. The magazine was banned on 16 July 2024 in Germany. The ban was lifted on 14 August 2024 by a German federal administrative court in Leipzig.

The editor-in-chief of Compact is Jürgen Elsässer; the CEO of the publishing company Compact-Magazin GmbH is Kai Homilius and Elsässer. The editorial office is in a family home in Falkensee in Brandenburg, on the western outskirts of Berlin.

In March 2020, the head of the Federal Office for the Protection of the Constitution, Thomas Haldenwang, classified Compact as a "certainly far-right extremist" ("gesichert rechtsextremistisch") publication, citing "revisionist, conspiracy-theoriest, and xenophobic motives", antisemitism, Islamophobia, and contempt for the principles of the Federal Republic of Germany. Compact was classified as a Verdachtsfall (suspected case), the first step to the censorship of a publication in Germany. Since 2015, Compact has aligned itself with the far-right party Alternative for Germany (AfD) and the Islamophobic Pegida movement.

On 16 July 2024 the Federal Ministry of the Interior banned the Compact entity for "anti-human hate speech and agitation" with immediate effect. Police searched nationwide business premises as well as the residences of a number of persons, which had financed or edited Compact, including editor-in-chief Elsässer. The Federal Administrative Court finally revoked the ban on 24 June 2025.

== History and business ==
In 2008, the editorial Kai Homilius Verlag began publishing a book series called Compact, which was edited by Elsässer. The following year, it began publishing DVDs in cooperation with Schild Verlag. In December 2010, the "zeroth" (Nullnummer) issue of the Compact magazine was published. Since August 2011, the magazine has been published by Compact-Magazin GmbH, which is located in Werder (Havel). Compact-Magazin GmbH was founded by Jürgen Elsässer, Kai Homilius, and the German Muslim convert Andreas Abu Bakr Rieger; each owned one third of the company at the beginning.

Since mid-2013, Compact magazine has advertised under the motto "Courage to the Truth" (German: Mut zur Wahrheit), which the AfD has also used as a slogan. Elsässer distributed the magazine initially on AfD political conventions. In spring of 2015, he decided to make the magazine an election campaign for the AfD. Especially since the 2015 migrant crisis in Europe, Compact advertises regularly with front pages and theme books for AfD politicians and their positions. Three days before the regional election in Saxony-Anhalt in 2016, Elsässer hosted a live conference with leading AfD candidate André Poggenburg, giving him space to present the AfD goals. He presented Compact as the voice of the "silent majority" and the AfD as their party. On election night Poggenburg did not answer questions from the public broadcasters, but instead only spoke to Compact. Thus Compact has positioned itself as the mouthpiece of the kind of AfD and Pegida supporters who completely reject the mainstream media, calling it the "lying press" (German: Lügenpresse).

The magazine's domain was temporarily seized by a German court in January 2018 after Compact failed to pay litigation fees. The journalist Richard Gutjahr had obtained a preliminary injunction against the vile suspicions about him that had been spread via Compact. The magazine suggested that the journalist had known about terrorist attacks in advance.

In the Russian-Ukrainian war, Compact advocates for Russian positions and blames NATO for the war. The stories also echo in the positions of many AfD politicians.

As of February 2024, the distribution of Compact was stopped by numerous bookstores and newsagents, because of the anti-democratic content. First, the company Valora ("Press & Books", 150 train station bookstores in Germany and various sales outlets in airports) announced that it would be removing Compact from its range, followed by the "Dr. Eckhart" group, which owns around 400 locations, including around 240 self-managed retail stores. "Dr. Eckhart" also stopped distributing other right-wing titles such as "Knight's Cross biographies", "Junge Freiheit", "Eigentümlich Frei", "Zuerst" and the "German Military Magazine" out of stores.

However, compact remains in press distribution; the "General Press Wholesale Association" (Gesamtverband Pressegroßhandel e.V.) stated, they want to preserve the "neutral supply mandate of the press wholesale trade" and Compact is not banned.

== Structure ==
=== Compact Magazine GmbH ===
"Compact-Magazin GmbH" is the main company and headed by the right-wing extremist Jürgen Elsässer. Kai Homilius and Jürgen Elsässer owned shares in the company in 2024. Homelius other business is to sell online nutritional supplements by his "9 Leben GmbH" in Magdeburg. The main products of the multimedia-oriented company are the monthly "Compact Magazine" with a recent circulation of 40,000 copies (2024) and the online video channel "Compact-TV".

In addition, "Compact-Magazin GmbH" is present in numerous social media channels and operates an online shop. In the online shop the company sold its own print products, and also books, audio books, CDs and DVDs. Merchandise items such as clothing, posters, stickers, mugs and medals were also sold.

The magazine's domain was temporarily seized by a German court in January 2018 after Compact failed to pay litigation fees. The journalist Richard Gutjahr had obtained a preliminary injunction against the vile suspicions about him that had been spread via Compact. The magazine suggested that the journalist had known about terrorist attacks in advance.

== Crossmedia presence ==
In addition to the print magazine "Compact", other Compact formats are published several times a year. In the "Compact Special" series, dossiers with background information on topics such as "Corona lies", "Russia as an enemy" and "Deep State" are published.

The "Compact History" series offers revisionist representations of German history. Speeches and quotes from people who are politically close to Compact are published as a "Compact Edition". Vladimir Putin, Donald Trump, Björn Höcke and Xavier Naidoo, and others have their say in "Compact Edition".

Compact combines different publication formats and cross-media communication strategies. The print offerings are supplemented by the online news program "Compact. Der Tag" (Compact. The Day). The "Compact Shop" offers ideological and esoteric books and merchandise.

=== Conspect Film GmbH ===
The sub-organization "CONSPECT FILM GmbH" also based in Hirschsprung Street in Falkensee produced a weekday news program as a service provider for "COMPACT-Magazin GmbH". The company was founded in 2021 by Mario Nieswandt, which runs the AfD-affiliated channel "Seelow TV". Stefanie Elsäßer, the wife of Jürgen Elsäßer was managing director since October 2022.

== Target groups ==
Compact claims to want to address the broad masses of the German population. Editor-in-chief Jürgen Elsässer is experienced in writing for different target groups and adapting his content and language accordingly. At demonstrations he usually begins speeches with the sentence: "My name is Jürgen Elsässer and my target group is the people ("das Volk")."

In some articles, the use of relevant codes and hidden messages ("dog whistling") also specifically addresses New Right, conspiracy ideologies or so-called Reich citizens.

Since the success of Pegida, Compact has placed a focus on the eastern German states. This is demonstrated on the one hand by specifically addressing East German experiences of collective devaluation in texts and images, and on the other hand by regional advertising campaigns and events.

According to the publisher, the majority of readers are over 40 years old. Another target group are Russian-German communities, which Compact serves both through pro-Russian perspectives and through the spread of Russian disinformation campaigns. Compact's homepage was also temporarily available in Russian.

== Ban in 2024 ==
On 16 July 2024, Federal Minister of the Interior Nancy Faeser imposed a ban on "COMPACT-Magazin GmbH" and "CONSPECT FILM GmbH". The organizations aims were "against the constitutional order within the meaning of Article 9 of the Basic Law and Section 3 of the Association Act."

On the morning of July 16, state police searched the properties and apartments of leading players, management, and significant shareholders of Compact and Conspect in order to seize assets and other evidence, such as propaganda material. The editorial headquarters in Weisensee was searched. The building of the co-founder and partner of Compact-Magazin GmbH Kai Homilius in Magdeburg was also searched.

In Hesse, a couple who were involved in the Compact Shop were searched and a mailbox company was closed. A lot of cash, collector coins, two vehicles as well as flyers and magazines were confiscated from the couple.

On 14 August 2024, the Federal Administrative Court suspended the ban on the magazine. On 24 June 2025, the court completely struck down the ban on the magazine and Compact-Magazin GmbH, saying that the publication did not meet conditions that justified the prohibition.

== Impact and reception ==
Since Compact was founded in 2010 as a "Querfront" project, it has become a central hinge between the large völkisch movement of AfD and its political for-front. Editors of the magazine became AfD employees in the Bundestag several times. Jürgen Elsässer managed to recruit right-wing extremist activists from the National Democratic Party of Germany (today: Die Heimat) and the Identitarian Movement such as Mario Müller, Paul Klemm and Martin Sellner as editors and authors. The magazine supported the far-right groups within AfD, like Young Alternative and politicians like Maximilan Krah.

Elsässer himself appears as a speaker at AfD rallies and at right-wing extremist demonstrations for the common people. However, strategically he is well connected. He is active in the scene property Villa Adlon in Potsdam, which was used to work with representatives of the AfD, CDU and extreme right-wing activists to find donors for the right-wing scene.

=== Media and science ===
In 2024 Die Zeit wrote: "Jürgen Elsässer is a man with a mission. ... [He] likes to openly state his goal. "We want to overthrow this regime." In 2018 he wrote: "The task of the opposition media is to contribute to the overthrow of the regime."

The media journalist Benjamin Friedrich wrote in 2016: "The journalistic performance of the magazine is low. Elsässer paraphrases or copies articles from the "mainstream press" and at the end adds to them the toughest possible opinion." According to Friedrich, Elsässer has copied and rephrased passages from the renowned Frankfurter Allgemeine Zeitung without attribution. He wrote that the right-wing scene in Germany could probably give more readers to Compact and Junge Freiheit, but he assumed that right-wing sympathizers mistrust printed newspapers in general and tend to use more online media.

Compact is described as "Querfront-Magazin" ("Querfront" literally meaning "cross-front", a term whose use in modern times mostly describes attempts at forming an alliance of left- and right-wing groups against globalism and in favour of populism).

According to Mathias Brodkorb, an anti-right-wing extremism activist and Social Democratic Party of Germany politician, Compact has an anti-American and anti-imperialistic veneer. These traditionally left-wing positions are employed by Compact to reach pro-Russian and nationalistic conclusions.

Andre Haller showed in a study from 2018, based on empiric observations undertaken in the U.S. and Germany, that populist politicians and right-wing alternative media are drawing ever closer to each other and that mutual dependencies are arising. He identified Compact as one of the main right-wing media outlets in Germany.

In 2016, the magazine won a negative prize Goldener Aluhut ("Golden Tin Foil Hat") in the category "media and blogs" for its receptivity towards conspiracy theories.

In August 2020, the magazine's Facebook and Instagram accounts were banned. Facebook said: "[We] prohibit organizations and individuals from using our services if they systematically attack people based on characteristics such as origin, gender and nationality. Therefore, we have removed Compact magazine from Facebook and Instagram."

=== State institutions ===
In December 2021, the magazine was designated a far-right extremist publication by the Federal Office for the Protection of the Constitution.

The Brandenburg Office for the Protection of the Constitution describes "Compact" as an "ideological superspreader that offers conspiracy theories a cross-milieu platform, bundles them, strengthens them and spreads them in a targeted manner."

== Literature ==
- Felix Schilk: Souveränität statt Komplexität. Wie das Querfront-Magazin ›Compact‹ die politische Legitimationskrise der Gegenwart bearbeitet. Edition DISS, 2017, ISBN 978-3-89771-768-8
- Kevin Culina, Jonas Fedders: Im Feindbild vereint. Zur Relevanz des Antisemitismus in der Querfront-Zeitschrift Compact. Edition Assemblage, 2016, ISBN 978-3-96042-004-0

== Literature ==
- Schilk, Felix; Gegenfurtner, Gregor (2022): Visuelles Framing im Compact-Magazin. Ergebnisse einer quantitativen Bildtypenanalyse. Zeitschrift für Rechtsextremismusforschung. Verlag Barbara Budrich
