= Gutjahr =

Gutjahr (German pronunciation: [ˈɡuːtjaːɐ̯]) is a surname. Notable people with the surname include:

- Diana Gutjahr (born 1984), Swiss politician
- Jeremiah Gutjahr (born 1997), American soccer player
- Nico Gutjahr (born 1993), German footballer
- Richard Gutjahr (born 1973), German journalist
