= Einat Wilf =

Israeli politician (born 1970)

- עינת וילף
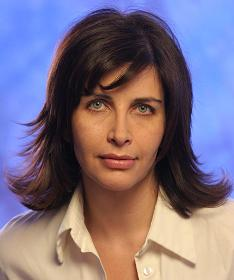
- Einat Wilf in 2008

Faction represented in the Knesset
- 2010–2011: Labor Party
- 2011–2013: Independence

Personal details
- Born: December 11, 1970 (age 55) Jerusalem, Israel
- Education: Harvard University (BA); INSEAD (MBA); University of Cambridge (PhD)

Einat Wilf (Hebrew: עינת וילף; born 11 December 1970) is an Israeli public diplomat and politician who served as a member of the Knesset for the Labor Party and Ehud Barak's Independence. In late 2025, on the background of the October 7 attacks and the ensuing war, she founded the Oz Party, based on her interpretation of Zionism vs Palestinianism and on the separation of state and religion. She became a member of The Reservists party in September 2026 and was placed third on a joint list with the New Economic Party.

== Biography ==
Einat Wilf was born in Jerusalem and raised in a Labor Zionist family. She studied at the Hebrew University High School in Jerusalem. She completed her military service as an intelligence officer in Unit 8200 with the rank of Lieutenant.

Wilf graduated from Harvard University with a BA in government and fine arts, then earned an MBA from INSEAD in France and her PhD in political science from Wolfson College, Cambridge.

Wilf married German journalist and television personality Richard Gutjahr in 2007. She gave birth to their son in 2010.

Wilf describes herself as a Zionist, a feminist and an atheist.

== Political and business career ==
Wilf served as a Foreign Policy Advisor to Vice Prime Minister Shimon Peres, a strategic consultant with McKinsey & Company in New York City, and a General Partner with Koor Corporate Venture Capital in Israel. Upon her return to Israel, Wilf worked as a Senior Fellow with the Jewish People Policy Planning Institute and a weekly columnist for the daily newspaper Israel HaYom. Wilf also taught social entrepreneurship at Sapir College, as became a frequent guest on Israeli radio and television talk shows and a member of the President's Conference Steering Committee.

In 2007, she ran for the presidency of the World Jewish Congress. However, she withdrew before the actual vote, and Ronald Lauder was elected president.

A member of the Israeli Labor Party, Wilf was placed 39th on the party's list for the 2003 elections, but failed to win a seat. She won fourteenth place on the party's list for the 2009 Knesset elections. Although Labor won only 13 seats, Wilf entered the Knesset on 10 January 2010 as a replacement for Ophir Pines-Paz, who had retired from politics. However, in January 2011, she was one of five MKs to leave the party to establish the new Independence party under the leadership of Ehud Barak. She lost her Knesset seat in January 2013 when the party chose not to contest the elections.

In June 2024, she joined the Israeli Citizen Spokespersons' office and launched a new podcast titled, Deep Dive.

In late 2025, she founded the Oz Party.

Wilf joined The Reservists on 7 September 2026 and was placed third on a joint slate between the party and the New Economic Party.

== Political views ==
Wilf advocates the legalization of soft drugs, citing the argument that the existing circumstances contribute to elevated levels of criminal activity.

According to Wilf, the core of the Israel-Palestinian conflict is not primarily territorial, but lies in the main goal of "Palestinianism", a term she has elaborated on, this being the absolute rejection and ultimate destruction of any form of Jewish sovereign state in Israel. She sees the issue of Palestinian refugees, i.e. the "right of return" claimed by the Palestinians and totally denied by Wilf, as the proof for the underlying tactic of all Palestinian negotiators to pursue the elimination of Israel. She claims that without addressing the refugees issue, a resolution to the conflict remains elusive. Wilf has consistently emphasized the imperative of taking action in the UN to dissolve UNRWA, contending that it perpetuates the Palestinian refugee problem. During Operation Protective Edge Wilf frequently engaged with the media, expressing concerns about UNRWA's nature, characterizing it not as a humanitarian organization but as a "hostile Palestinian organization that work to perpetuate the dream of return".

== It’s NOT the Electoral System, Stupid ==
In her book It’s NOT the Electoral System, Stupid (2013), Einat Wilf contributes to the academic debate about political culture as well as to the political debate on whether Israels political system should be reformed or not. Here key arguments are:

- The main thesis: She argues that it is not the electoral system that determines politics, but the political culture. With an international comparative analysis she wants to show that Israel’s electoral system is no worse than those of other democracies and therefore should not be changed. „All electoral systems in democracies suck equally“. The Israeli one is „no worse than other systems, and (…) in order to deal with problems that we do have, we have to deal with them directly rather than by hoping that there’s a shortcut.“
- The starting point: The demand to change the israel electoral system is widespread in Israel. The rule that every party that gains at least 2% of the vote enters parliament leads to a multi-party system is widely regarded as the reason for difficult negotiations and unstable governments. There were and are several attempts to change that rule (to 3%, 6% or 10%), believing that having two big parties would lead to stable governments.
- The comparative analysis: Wilf argues that Israel's political system is very stable. The first indicator is continuity: Israel is one of the only 23 states on the planet that have been continuously democratic since 1948, „without civil wars or overruled elections“. The second indicator is the frequency of elections: since 1949 there have been only 18 Knesset elections, an average of an election every three-and-a-half years. The third indicator is the number of prime ministers or presidents: the USA, the UK and Israel are three countries that, from 1948 to the present had 12 of them. The fourth indicator is the complexity and length of political negotiations: as an example, she compares the negotiations for Barack Obama's healthcare reform with the one in Israel 30 years ago and found that the Israeli negotiations were settled way faster. Wilf's conclusion is that „there is no comparative problem of stability“.
- The political culture: many Israelis criticize Israel's political system for allowing the Haredim, the orthodox, conservative Jews, a minority of around 14% of the Israeli population, to be highly overrepresented in the Knesset. Wilf compares this with the National Rifle Association of America or the pro-Israel Lobby in the USA that are not mass movements, but have enormous influence in Washington. Wilf's answer to this is that the Haredim and other such successful minorities a) are operating under an "umbrella of passive sympathy“ of the society tolerating their ideas and b) are mobilized, disciplined, organized, and typically single-issue. If the political system of Israel would change into a two-party system, the Haredim would simply change their lobby model and organize themselves as the Haredim of party A and the Haredim of party B. To the Israeli criticizing the Haredim, Wilf's answer is "There are no easy solutions. You want to fight the Haredim? Be as organized, as disciplined as they are.“
- The cost of electoral reforms: Wilf argues that all government systems are based on negotiations. "The notion that you can somehow do away with interests, with negotiations, is by definition a nondemocratic idea“. Her first argument: If a reform would force smaller parties to merge with larger parties, negotiations would merely move from over the table to under the table and be less visible to the public. Her second argument: If a reform would create a presidential system, the executive would weaken. Wilf cites the analysis of political scientist Avraham Diskin, that in the 20th century about 50% of the suggestions made by the president of the USA were accepted by Congress, whereas in Israel over 90% of the prime minister's policies are implemented. Her third argument: The Israeli reform of the electoral system in the 1990s led to more instability. A separate vote for prime minister was introduced, failed, and was quickly reversed. It led to more frequent elections.
- The interests behind reform projects: In Wilf's view, the demands for reforms of the political system are driven by academics or think tanks searching for reputation and fundraising as well as politicians searching for „easy targets“, presenting simple solutions for complex problems to the public in order to gain votes.
- Reception:
  - Shany Mor, political theorist and D.Phil. Oxford, co-author of Einat Wilf at various occasions, supports her positions. He says that Israel’s system is not only no worse than any other democracy, but with Wilf comes to the conclusion that "it has been our saving grace. Contrary to the view of many ‘solutionists’ in Israel, not only would Israel’s problems not have been easier to ‘solve’ in another system, but it is that particular system, with its possibility of debate, that has contained the danger of dictatorship, civil war, and violence. In Israel’s electoral system, practically every worldview is represented, and so has a voice." Mor concentrates on the weight of political culture and coins the term of the "habit of legitimate debate". He states with Wilf that every dictatorship has elections and parliaments, thus they can not be the defining trait of democracies. "The essence of a democracy emerges not from its formal structures, not from its constitutions, and not even from its laws. Rather, it emerges, over time, in the continuous demonstration of the habit of legitimate debate. This means that debate is a habit — a muscle that is regularly flexed — and it is seen as legitimate. It means that the parties to the debate, having yelled at each other, accept that they are all legitimate members of the body that debates."
  - Dubi Kanengisser, politician and PhD in political science (Toronto), reviewed the book in a blog post at haayal. He says that the book fills a gap. In the debate about a reform of the Israeli political system there were not many organized argumentations. "The main contribution of the book to the discussion is not by presenting new arguments, but rather by the fact that it concentrates them in an orderly, accessible and readable manner. In the 167 short pages of the book, Wilf presents an eloquent, simple and convincing argument." He points out her argument of the "optimism bias" that leads many people to see the flaws in the existing system and the possible advantages of the proposed reforms instead of doing a balanced calculation. The second argument he highlights are the costs of reforms, leading to years of incertainty during the decade-long adaptation of politicians and voters to the new system, resulting in lower efficiency of the system. The third argument Kanengisser emphasizes he calls "more fundamental": the attempt to fix existing flaws with changes of the constitution and the political system is a dangerous misrepresentation. The "center" of the Israeli political spectrum is worried about the influence of extremist settlers and Haradrim and tries to solve this problem with changes of the electoral system. "Technical solutions solve technical problems; fundamental problems will not be solved in this way". "Minority groups do not disappear when we change the system. (...) The fundamental problems will arise in new ways if we try to hide them by changing the method. Thus, for example, Wilf simulates the voices of the minorities in society to the flow of water: if we block them in one way, they will find another way. (...) Wilf reminds that no minority will succeed in achieving its goals if the public does not support these goals at least partially. (...) Wilf says that “constitutionality is a worldview. It is not a document,” and that the goal should be “to constantly promote a healthy civil society and not technical changes in the writing of a constitution."
  - Avraham Diskin, political scientist with focus on comparative studies, essentially agrees with Wilf: "I don’t think that Einat Wilf really knows much about [the science of electoral systems], but at least she has the appropriate instincts, and because of that I’ll say that her general tendency is the correct one,” He argues that most people who demand electoral reform don’t really understand how the system works. “They propose reforms that are really counterproductive.”
  - Arye Carmon, founding president of the think tank Israel Democracy Institute, says that it is "a ridiculous book ... full of mistakes" that does not describe the situation in Israel correctly. In his view, the book avoids "the crisis the political situation here is in" and Wilf stands alone with her views. "No one, but really no one, would argue that a reform is not needed".

== The War of Return ==
In the 2020 book The War of Return, Wilf and Adi Schwartz argue that the Palestinian right of return is not a right, but a thinly veiled attempt for the destruction of Israel, and is the most salient reason there has not been peace between Israel and the Palestinians.

== Published works ==
- My Israel, Our Generation, BookSurge Publishing (2007), ISBN 1-4196-5913-8
- Back to Basics: The Road to Saving Israel's Education (at no extra cost), Yedioth Ahronot (April 2008)
- Global actors and global politics : the case of the World Jewish Congress campaign against the Swiss Banks (thesis, Cambridge 2008) Cambridge, UK.
- (with Zvi Bisk): It’s NOT the Electoral System, Stupid. (Hebrew: Zu Lo HaShita, Tambal). 167 p. Tel Aviv: Tepper Publishing Ltd. (2013)
- Symposium on Rabin's legacy, Fathom, Autumn 2015
- Winning the War of Words: Essays on Zionism and Israel, CreateSpace Independent Publishing Platform (November 3, 2015), ISBN 978-1515072973, Full text on SCRIBD (pdf)
- Perry Anderson's House of Zion: A Symposium, Fathom, Spring 2016
- Telling Our Story: Essays on Zionism, the Middle East, and the Path to Peace, CreateSpace Independent Publishing Platform (March 19, 2018), ISBN 978-1515072973
- The War of Return: How Western Indulgence of the Palestinian Dream Has Obstructed the Path to Peace, with Adi Schwartz, St. Martin’s Publishing Group (2020), ISBN 978-1250252760
- Peace Not Now: Time for the Jews to Determine their Fate, Sella Meir Publishing House (2025), ISBN 979-8198903043
