= Russophilia =

Admiration and fondness of Russia

Flag of Russia

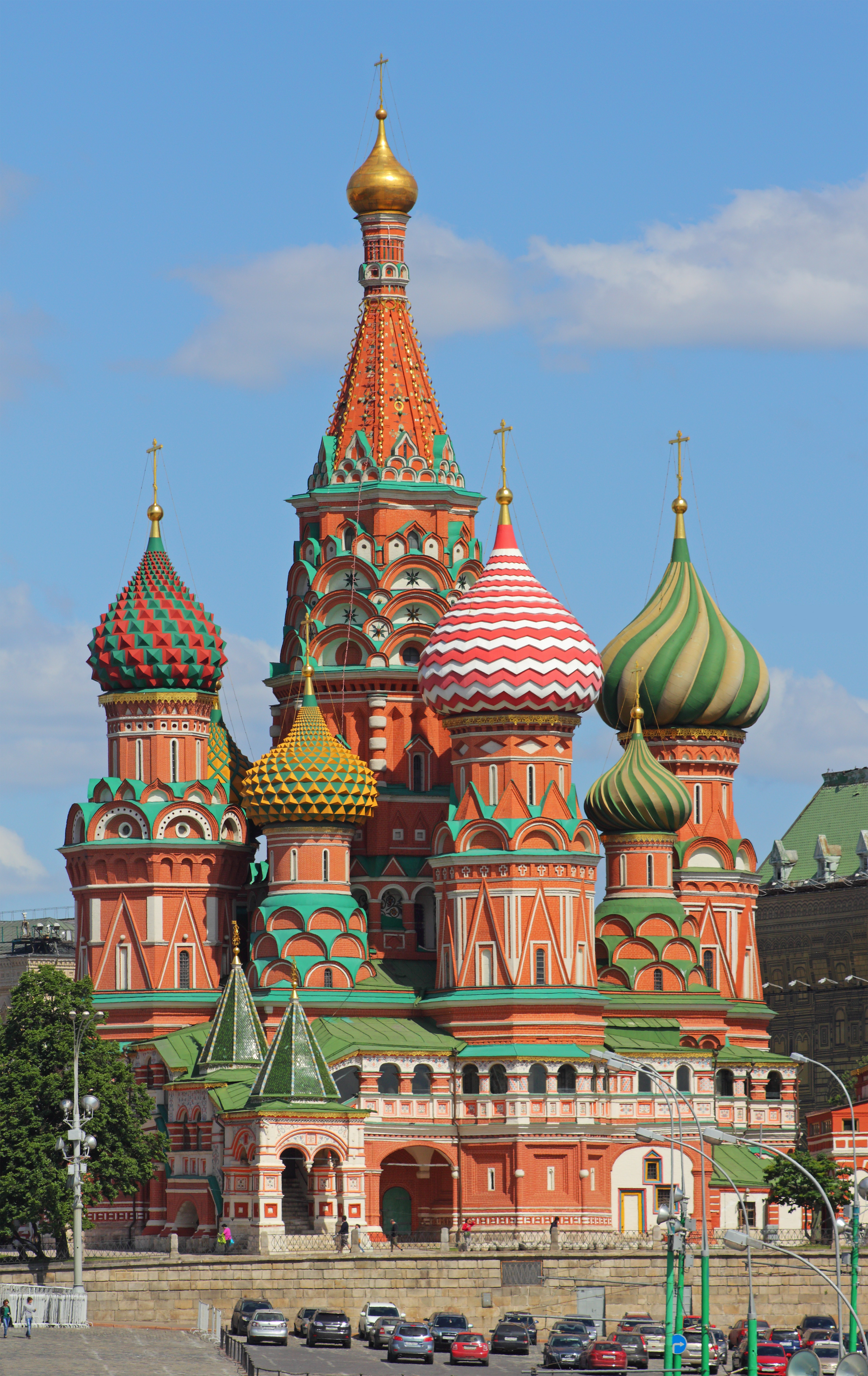
Saint Basil's Cathedral on Red Square in Moscow is often considered as a cultural symbol of Russia.

Russophilia is the identification or solidarity with, appreciation of, or support for the country, people, language, and history of Russia. One who espouses Russophilia is called a Russophile. Its antonym is Russophobia. In the 19th century, Russophilia was often linked to variants of pan-Slavism, since the Russian Empire was the only Slavic sovereign state during and after the Springtime of Nations.

In politics, the term has been used to describe political actors who support closer relations with the Russian government or support its policies. Particularly in the post-Soviet states, Russophile politicians may also support maintaining or increasing Russification policies, such as Alexander Lukashenko.

== By country ==
=== Armenia ===
The Armenian Revolutionary Federation, Republican Party of Armenia, and Prosperous Armenia are the main pro-Russian political parties in Armenia.

=== Belarus ===
Belarus has close political and economic ties with Russia, both being part of the Union State, the Collective Security Treaty Organization, the Commonwealth of Independent States, and the Eurasian Economic Union. Following the 2020–2021 Belarusian protests and the Russian invasion of Ukraine, many observers have described Belarus as a Russian puppet state or a satellite state.

=== China ===
The People's Republic of China under the leadership of General Secretary of the Chinese Communist Party Xi Jinping has supported the Russian Federation closely following international sanctions after Russia invaded Ukraine. China had close ties with the Soviet Union prior to the Sino-Soviet split, owing to ideological kinship between the two communist states. Previous anti-Russian sentiment in China has greatly downgraded, due to perceived common anti-Western sentiment among Russian and Chinese nationalists. Ethnic Russians are one of the 56 ethnic groups officially recognized by the People's Republic of China.

According to a 2019 survey by the Pew Research Center, 71% of Russians have a favourable view of China. A YouGov survey conducted in the same year found that 71% of the Chinese think Russia has a positive effect on world affairs. During the 2022 Russian invasion of Ukraine, many social media users in China showed sympathy for Russian narratives due in part to distrust of US foreign policy. According to a Carter Center China Focus survey in April 2022, approximately 75% of respondents agreed that supporting Russia in the war in Ukraine was in China's best interest. On the other hand, a Genron NPO poll published seven months later found that 50.6% of Chinese respondents expressed some level of opposition to Russia’s wartime actions, compared with the 39.5% who expressed that its wartime actions were "not wrong".

=== Finland ===
The Communist movement in Finland during the Cold War inclined towards pro-Soviet tendencies, of which the Taistoist movement was especially pro-Soviet. Into the 2020s, Russophilic sentiment in Finland has persisted in various forms. In 2023, former Social Democrat representative Mikko Elo, together with Mauno Saari, founded the Russophilic organization Naapuriseura ('Neighbour Society'), which promotes closer ties and cultural exchange with Russia.

The modern Finnish political landscape has also seen some pro-Russian political parties. The Power Belongs to the People (VKK) party was notable for being the only political party in Finland with a strong, openly pro-Russian platform in 2022. VKK opposed economic sanctions imposed on Russia and expressed support for the Russian invasion of Ukraine. However, the party has since dissasociated from the connections to Russia after Ano Turtiainen was replaced by Antti Asikainen. Nevertheless, other political entities have also since echoed pro-Russian positions to varying degrees. The Truth Party in Finland, had also refused to condemn Russia's 2022 invasion of Ukraine and advocates for stronger bilateral relations with Russia. And some who have promoted pro-Russian sentiment have also been found in the Freedom Alliance party of Finland, as a former National Coalition member who argued that Ukraine should be Russian territory was allowed to be among the candidates of the Freedom Alliance party in the 2025 Finnish municipal elections. Pro-Russian viewpoints have also been advocated by the Freedom Alliance member Armando Meman, who has been seen on Russian national television.

Certain individual political activists in Finland have also been prominent for their support of Russia. Johan Bäckman is widely recognized for his pro-Russian views and has actively recruited Finnish volunteers to participate in the conflict in Ukraine on Russia’s side, even for a time joining the VKK party, led by Ano Turtiainen. Similarly to Bäckman, another Finnish influencer Janus Putkonen is known for pro-Russian rhetoric, and maintains the extremely pro-Russian Finnish language MV-media website from Russian occupied Donbas, which is known for sharing pro-Kremlin rhetoric. Some members of the Finns Party also held pro-Russian views in the past.

=== Germany ===
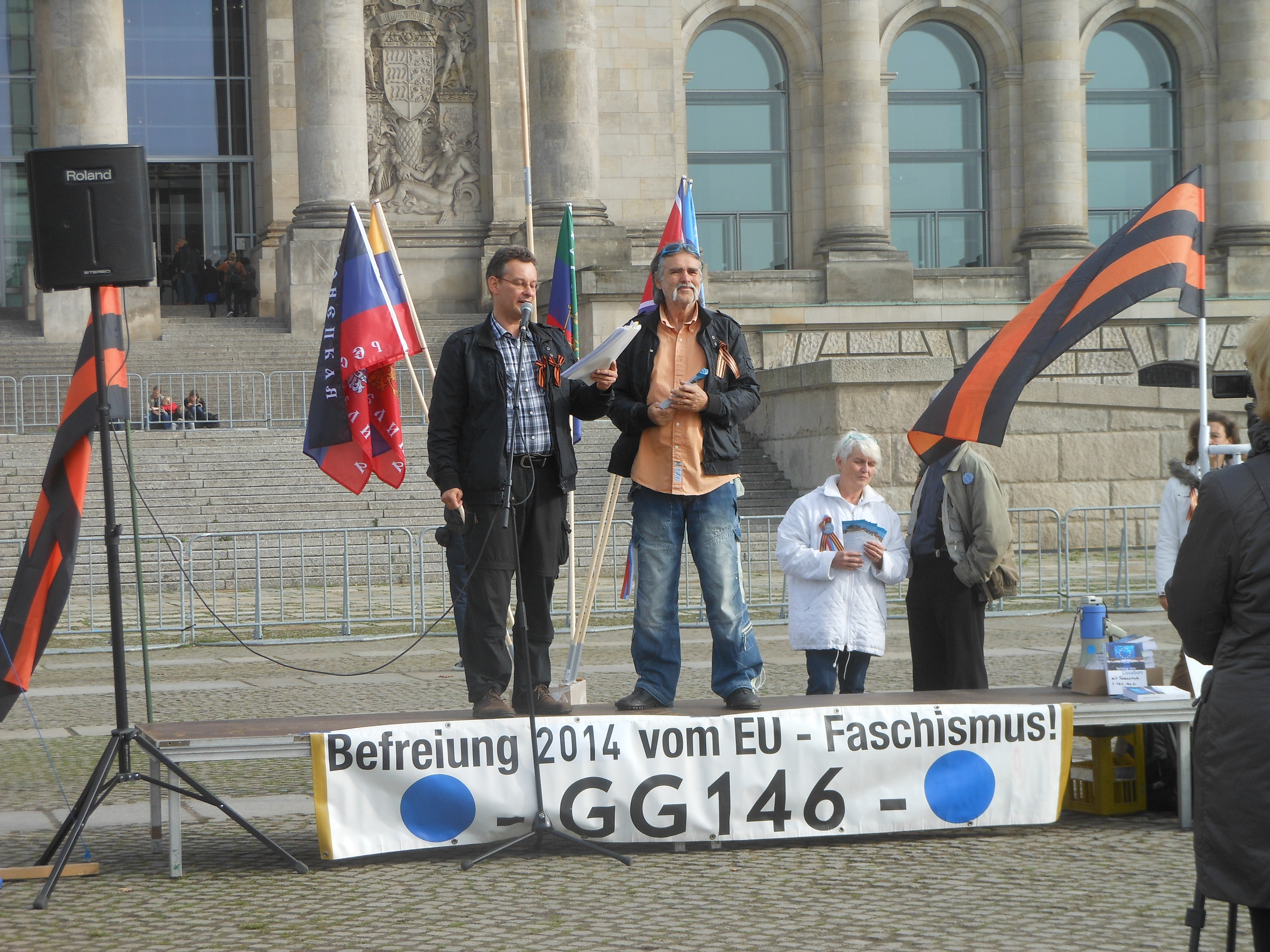
Members of the "Reichsbürger movement" protesting in Berlin, featuring flags of the Ribbon of Saint George, of the Donetsk People's Republic, and of the Federal State of New Russia, 2014

German philosopher Friedrich Nietzsche described Russia as "the only power that has durability in it, which can wait, which can still produce something... the antithesis of that pitiable European petty-state politics and nervousness, with which the foundation of the German Reich has entered its crucial phase..." in his 1895 book The Antichrist. Many members of the far-right political party Alternative for Germany (AfD) have expressed pro-Russian or pro-Kremlin sentiments on various issues. The left-populist party Sahra Wagenknecht Alliance has expressed pro-Russian sentiments and opinions.

=== India ===
A poll conducted in summer 2022 shows that Indians most frequently named Russia their most trusted partner, with 43% naming Russia as such compared to 27% who named the US.

=== Indonesia ===
Some Indonesians have positively compared support for Russian president Vladimir Putin in the Russo-Ukrainian war to support for former president Suharto in the Indonesian invasion of East Timor. Russophiles are also found among the political left, who support Russia due to the inaugural Indonesian president, Sukarno's closeness to the Soviet Union. Pro-Russian sentiment is especially strong among members of the governing Indonesian Democratic Party of Struggle, led by Sukarno's daughter Megawati Sukarnoputri, who publicly criticized Ukraine and President Volodymyr Zelenskyy.

=== Romania ===
Traditionally, relations between Romania and Russia were shaped by the political system applied in both countries. Relations were cordial prior to the 19th century, and Russia helped Romania achieving its independence from the Ottoman Empire, the royal families of both countries later being allied. Relations developed after the Second World War, when Romania fell under the communist umbrella led by the Soviet Union, becoming a satellite state of the USSR. However, after Ceaușescu's rise to power in 1965, relations became strained; Romania became the first country to free itself fully from the Soviet Union, and relations were mostly only cordial, as Ceaușescu promoted his own view of communism, inspired by the Chinese and North Korean systems, rather than the Soviet vision.

After the fall of the Eastern Bloc, Romania became an ally of the United States, joining both NATO and the European Union, which faced criticism from Moscow. Romania's strategic position in NATO was seen as undesirable by Russia. As nationalist movements grew in Romania during the early 2020s, parties such as the Alliance for the Union of Romanians or S.O.S. Romania, parties seeking closer ties with Russia, rose to power, inadvertently dragging Romania back into a potential Russian influence zone.

Revelations of Russian interference in the 2024 Romanian presidential election strained bilateral relations, with numerous large protests erupting across Romania after pro-Russian far-right candidate Călin Georgescu won the first round of elections through supposedly corrupt means, such as falsifying his budget for the electoral campaign, alongside Russian state-sponsored troll farms and hackers artificially increasing his support on social media, particularly TikTok. Due to those accusations, the Constitutional Court of Romania annulled the election, while Romania's Permanent Electoral Authority barred Georgescu from running at next year's repeated election. Subsequently, George Simion replaced Georgescu as a candidate in the 2025 Romanian presidential election; however, despite securing a victory in the first round, he was eventually defeated in the runoff on 18 May by his pro-European and pro-Western opponent, Nicușor Dan.

=== Serbia ===
Serbia has historically been regarded as one of the most pro-Russian countries not only in Europe but also globally, with sympathies towards Russia remaining widespread to this day. Many Serbs consider Russia to be one of their country's closest allies, particularly due to the countries' shared (or similar) Slavic heritage, culture, language, and Eastern Orthodox Christian faith. According to the European Council on Foreign Relations' 2021 opinion poll, 54% of Serbians considered Russia as an ally. In comparison, 11% perceived the European Union as an ally, and only 6% regarded the United States in the same manner.

In 2017, the inhabitants of the Serbian village of Adžinci renamed their village Putinovo, in honor of Vladimir Putin. Following the 2022 Russian invasion of Ukraine, People's Patrol, a far-right group, organized pro-Russian rallies in Belgrade, which were attended by 4,000 people.

Public opinion surveys have shown that, even after many years into the Russian full-scale invasion and occupation of Ukraine, Serbian citizens' support for Russia has remained, on average, higher than in any other European country. Results of opinion polls that were conducted by the International Republican Institute across Western Balkan countries in the summer of 2025 found that 52% of Serbian citizens hold "very favorable" views of Russia, while Russian President Vladimir Putin is viewed "very favorably" by 50% of Serbian citizens. Similarly, the results of WeBalkans' opinion polls, which were conducted during the same time, found that Russia is considered as "trustworthy" by 59% of Serbian citizens, which was significantly higher than Serbian citizens' trust in any other country or international institution, including European Union, United States, United Kingdom, and NATO, which were regarded as "trustworthy" only by 38%, 17%, 13%, and 5% of Serbian citizens respectively.

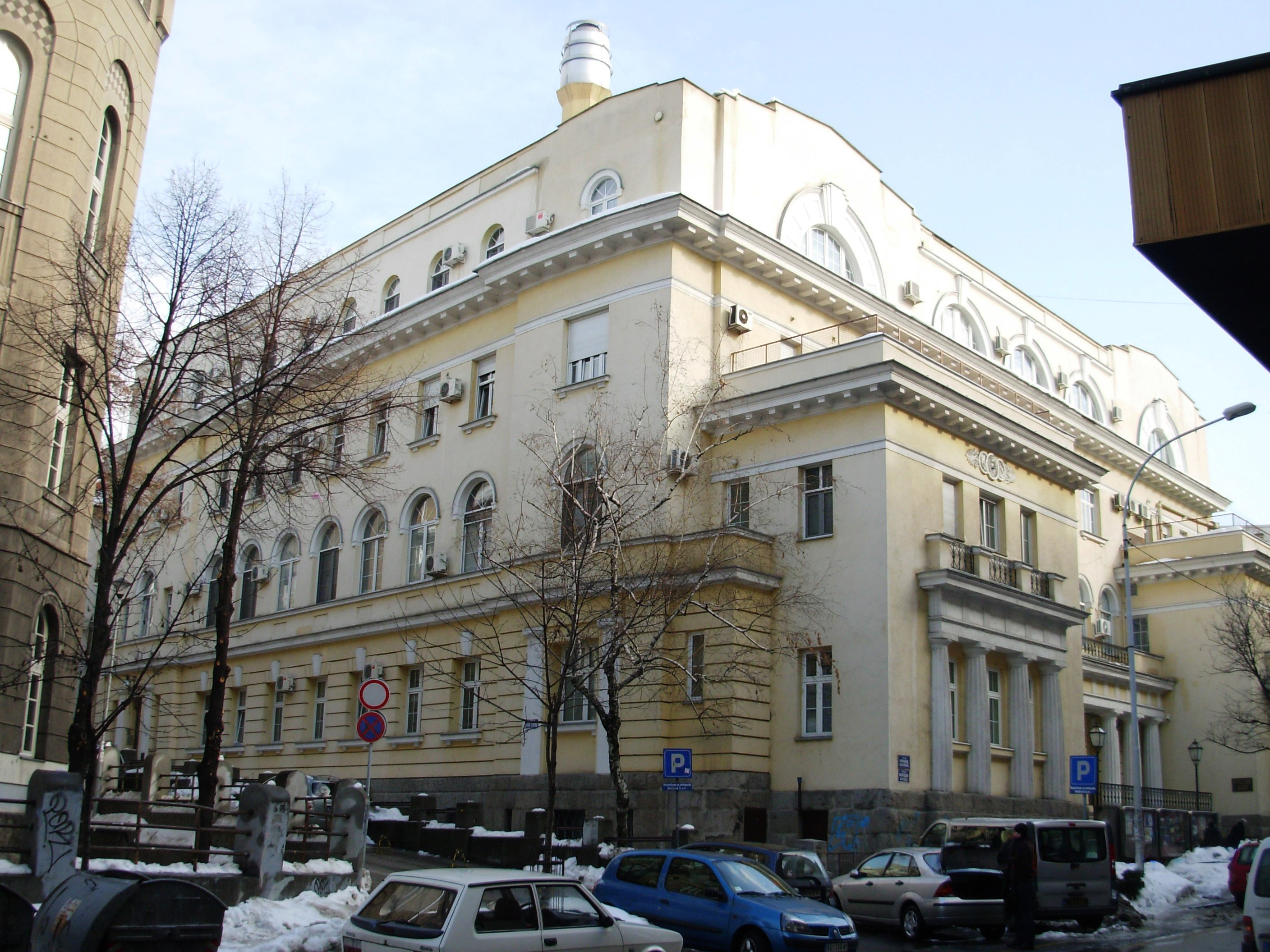
Russian Center of Science and Culture, Belgrade

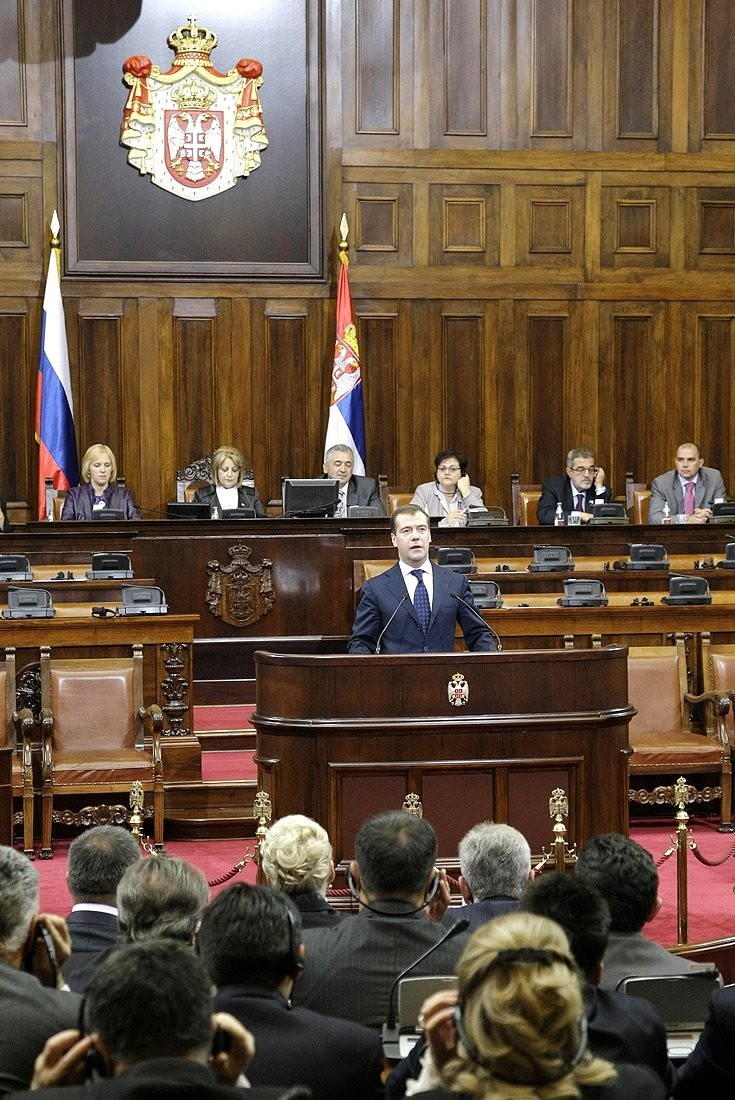
Dmitry Medvedev in the National Assembly of Serbia

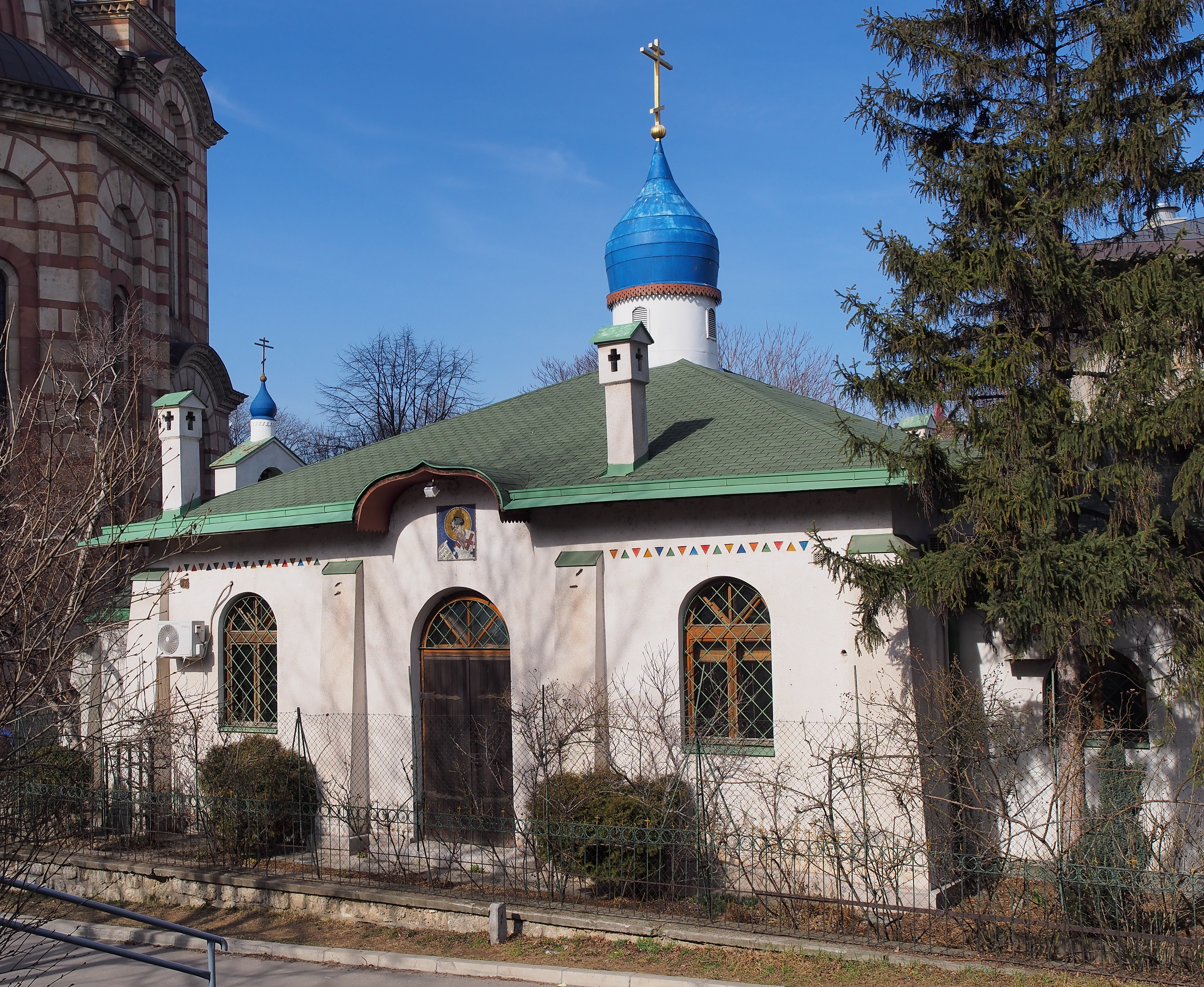
Russian Orthodox Church of the Holy Trinity in Tašmajdan Park, Belgrade

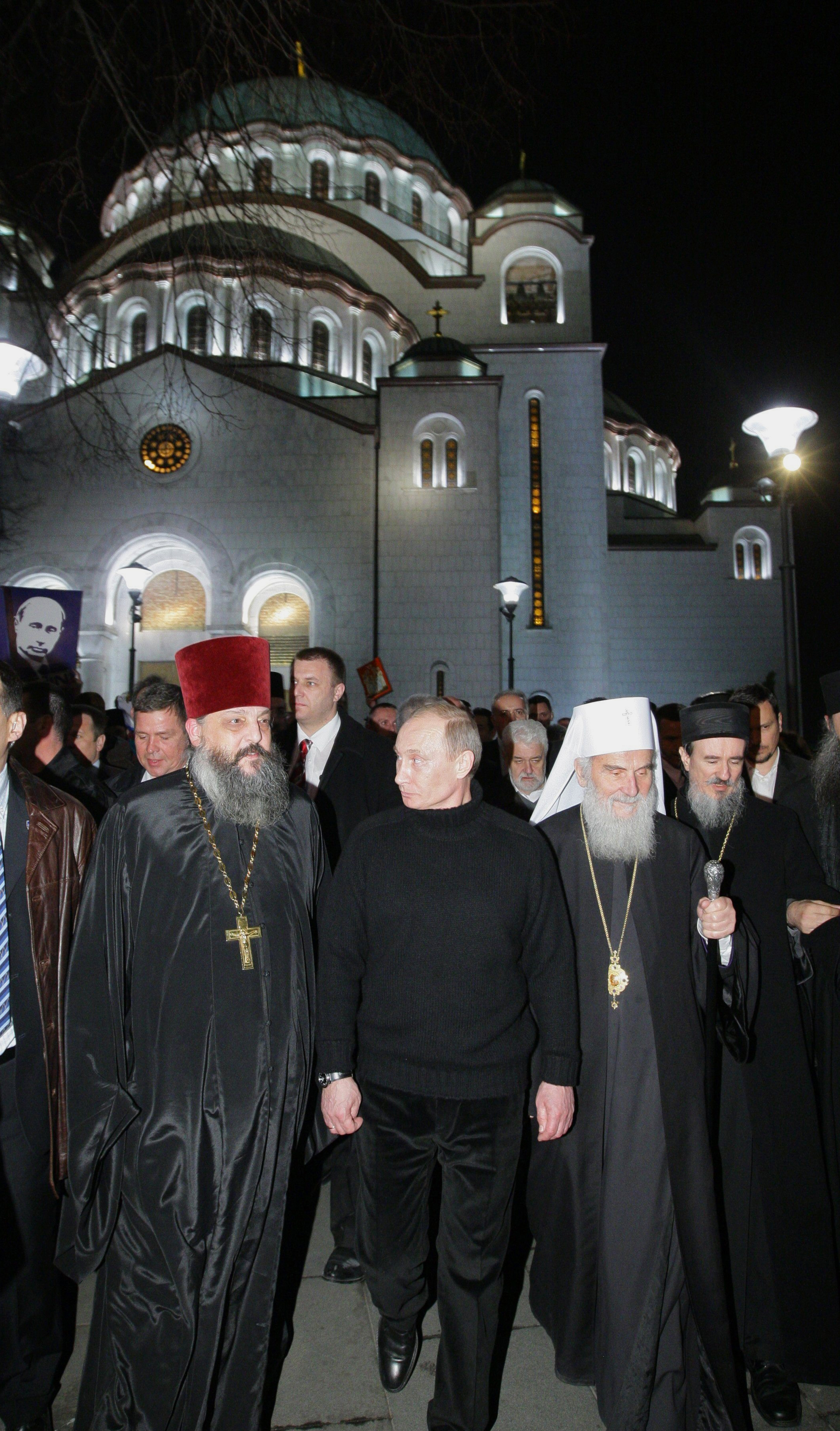
Vladimir Putin in front of the Church of Saint Sava

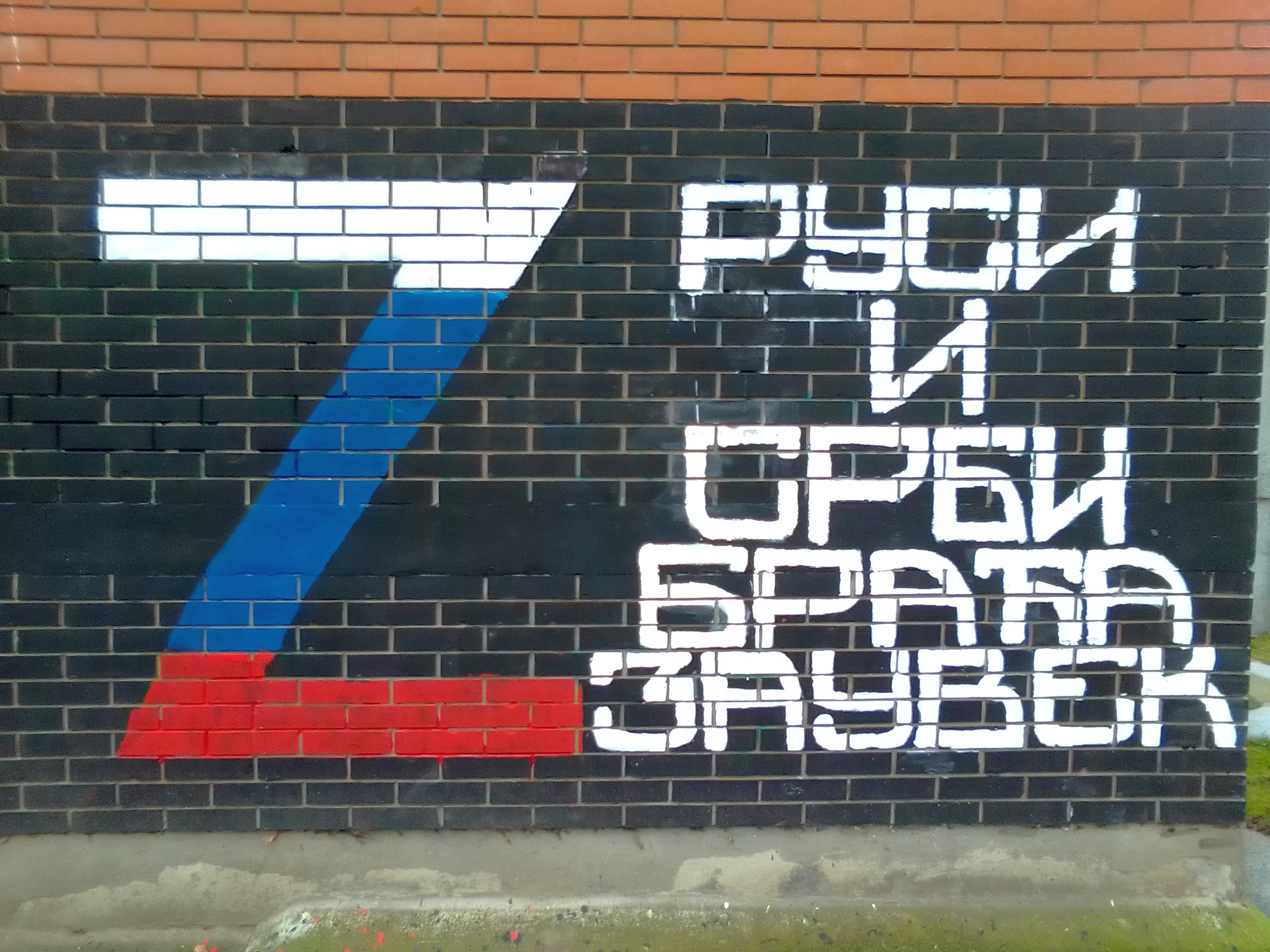
"Z" symbol in support of Russia's war against Ukraine with an inscription "Russians and Serbs brothers forever"

=== Ukraine ===
Map showing the Russian Federation in dark red with Russian-occupied territories in Europe in light red

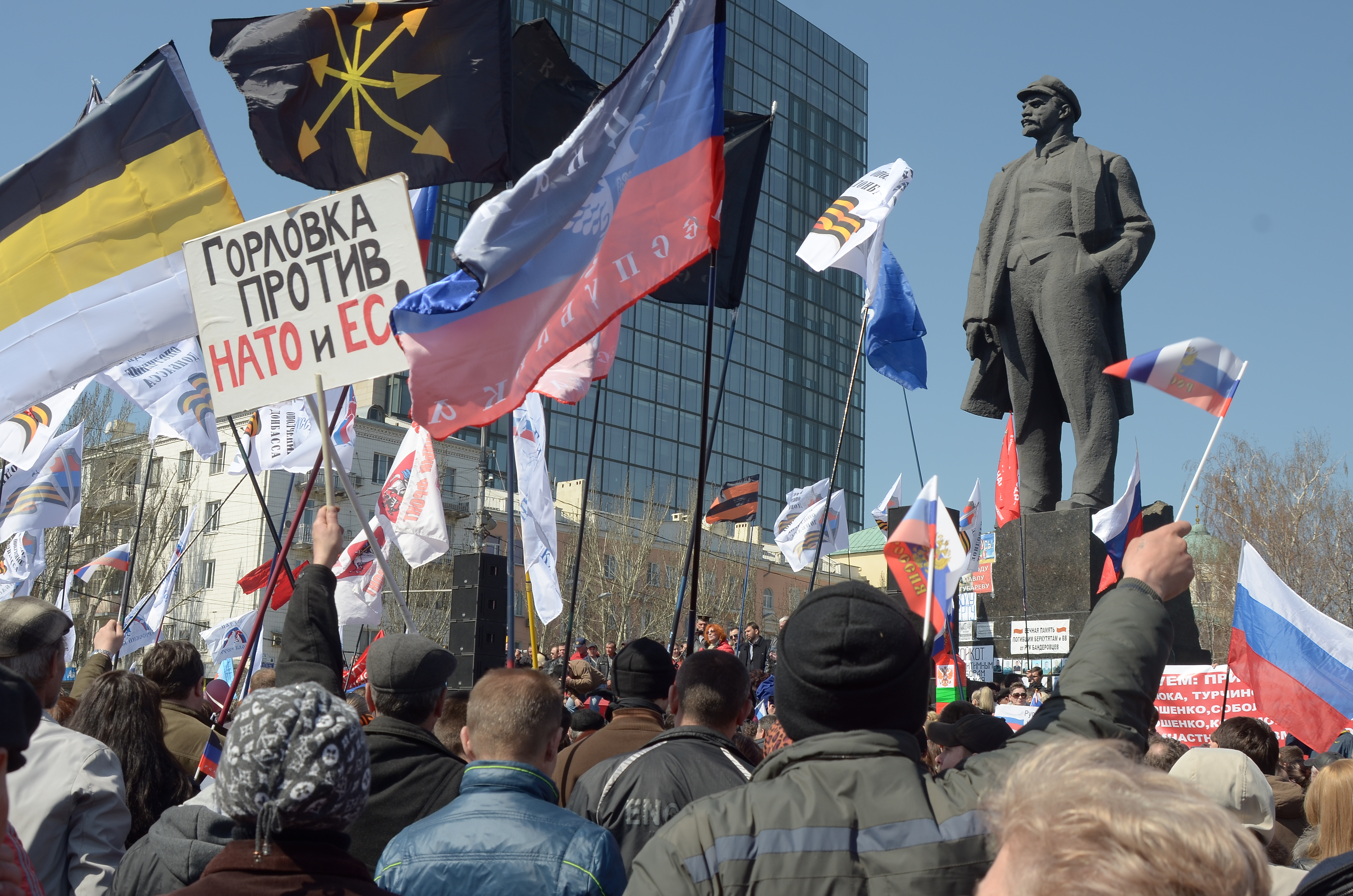
Pro-Russian rally in Donetsk, eastern Ukraine, April 2014

Following Ukrainian independence in 1991, in the 1991 Ukrainian independence referendum, 92% (including 55% of ethnic Russians) voted for independence from the Soviet Union, but some Ukrainians, mostly in the east and south of the country, voted to see a more Russophile attitude of the government, ranging from closer economic partnership to full national union. Russia and Ukraine had especially close economic ties, and the Russophilic political party, the Party of Regions, became the largest party in the Verkhovna Rada in the 2006 Ukrainian parliamentary election, receiving 33% of the votes. It would remain a dominant force in Ukrainian politics until the 2014 Revolution of Dignity. Following the 2014 Russian military intervention in Ukraine, the overall attitude of Ukrainians towards Russia and Russians has become much more negative, with most Ukrainians favoring NATO and European Union membership. Their views on Russia would further deteriorate following the 2022 Russian invasion of Ukraine.

A survey by the Kyiv International Institute of Sociology in 2016 found that 67% of Ukrainians had a positive attitude to Russians, but that only 8% had a positive attitude to the Russian government. According to a February 2021 poll of the country's population, 41% of Ukrainians had a "good" attitude towards Russians (42% negatively), while in general, 54% of Russians had a positive attitude towards Ukraine. However, this sentiment among Ukrainians collapsed following the Russian invasion of Ukraine in 2022. In a poll in August 2022, 81% of Ukrainians expressed negative views towards Russia, 14% have neutral attitudes, and only 3% have positive ones.

This change following the invasion in 2022 is also reflected in political attitudes. According to two polls conducted by the Kyiv International Institute of Sociology in February and May 2022, Russophilic attitudes in Ukraine plunged in just three months, with positive attitudes towards Russia falling from 53% to 4% in the East, and from 45% to just 1% in the South. Conversely, support for Ukrainian membership in NATO skyrocketed, from 36% to 69% in the country's east, and from 48% to 81% in the south. From a poll in April 2022, 90% of surveyed Ukrainians support stripping deputies from pro-Russian parties of their mandates, and 86% support banning the activities of these parties entirely. As a result, the Carnegie Endowment for International Peace announced that regardless of how the war ends, pro-Russian parties and sentiments in Ukraine are "firmly in the past".

Besides politics, there is also increasing support for the removal of symbols of Russian culture in Ukraine, including monuments and streets named after notable Russians, along with limiting Russian literature and music. Massive decommunization campaigns coupled with intensive derussification have been carried out since 2014, most notably the toppling of several statues of Vladimir Lenin (termed Leninfall) and the renaming of many places with Soviet-associated names. Since the invasion, Ukrainian cities demolished monuments to Russian writer Alexander Pushkin across the country, and there are also hundreds of renamed placenames due to their affiliation with Russia.

=== United Kingdom ===
In a 2023 interview conducted by the Ukrainian Rada TV, former Prime Minister of the United Kingdom Boris Johnson admitted he had a favorable view of Russian language, civilisation and culture, despite his criticism of Russia's war on Ukraine.

MP for Clacton and Reform UK leader Nigel Farage has made multiple comments praising Russian president Vladimir Putin and pushing pro-Russian views since the beginning of the Russo-Ukrainian war in 2014 as well as after the Russian invasion in 2022. Along with Farage, Your Party leader Jeremy Corbyn is also noted for not sharing the dislike of Russia promoted by mainstream politicians and he was called "UK's Russophile-in-chief" in 2018 for his dissenting stance on the poisoning of Sergei and Yulia Skripal.

=== United States ===
From the end of World War II to the end of the Cold War and also several decades afterward, the Republican Party was considered to have more negative attitudes towards Russia than the Democratic Party, with the former overwhelmingly perceiving Russia as one of the biggest (if not the biggest) US adversaries and threats to US's friends and allies across the world, as well as a threat to US interests on international level, which it pursued by supporting US's enemies. However, the perception of Russia among Republican Party members began to shift gradually from negative to positive in the 2010s, with an increasing number of Republicans and their supporters expressing positive views on Russia. A 2017 poll highlighted that around 32% of respondents had favorable views of Russian President Vladimir Putin. Following the Russian invasion of Ukraine, these numbers surged. A YouGov poll found nearly 62% of Republicans preferred Vladimir Putin over Joe Biden, noting that the former was a stronger leader than the latter. Many notable Republican politicians and conservative public figures, including US President Donald Trump, US Vice President JD Vance, Trump's Senior Counselor and media executive Steve Bannon, politician and commentator Pat Buchanan, Kentucky Senator Rand Paul, Georgia Representative Marjorie Taylor Greene, Florida Representative Matt Gaetz, political commentator and live streamer Nick Fuentes, social media influencer Jackson Hinkle, television presenter Tucker Carlson, political commentator and journalist Megyn Kelly, political activist and author Candace Owens, and Turning Point USA's founder Charlie Kirk, have expressed support for Russia or Putin in the war against Ukraine.

=== Vietnam ===
Favorable perceptions of Russia in Vietnam have 83% of Vietnamese people viewing Russia's influence positively in 2017. This stems from historic Soviet support for North Vietnam and the Viet Cong during the Vietnam War, as well as support for Vietnam since 1975 by both the Soviet Union and Russia.

== See also ==
Media related to Russophiles at Wikimedia Commons

- Eurasianism – Socio-political movement in the Russian Federation
- Euroscepticism – Body of criticism of the European Union
- List of pro-Russian political parties
- Nostalgia for the Soviet Union
- Putinism – Political system in Russia under Vladimir Putin
- Russian nationalism – Russian political ideology
- Slavophilia – Intellectual movement in Russia opposed to Western European influences
- Soviet patriotism – Patriotism theory developed by Vladimir Lenin
- Z (military symbol) – Russian military and propaganda symbol
