= Putinovo =

Settlement in Medveđa, Serbia

Putinovo Adžinci Путиново
- Village
- Location within Serbia
- Coordinates: 42°58′24″N 21°28′44″E
- Country: Serbia
- Region: Southern and Eastern Serbia
- District: Jablanica District
- Municipality: Medveđa

Population (2017)
  - Total: 40
- Time zone: UTC+1 (CET)
  - Summer (DST): UTC+2 (CEST)

Putinovo (Serbian Cyrillic: Путиново), formerly known as Adžinci (Аџинци), is a hamlet of the Gornji Gajtan rural mountain village in Serbia's Medveđa municipality. It is notable for having been renamed in 2016 after Russian President Vladimir Putin.

== Geography ==
Putinovo is one of 10 hamlets that make up the village of Gornji Gajtan, located on the slopes of the Radan Mountain, in the Medveđa municipality. It is roughly 250 kilometres (160 mi) from Belgrade, and close to the Kosovo border.

== History and name change ==
The area is mostly populated by Serbs whose ancestors arrived in the area from Montenegro in 1878. The village was called Adžinci for centuries, when in November 2016, locals decided to rename it to Putinovo (lit. 'Putin's [village]') in honor of Russian president Vladimir Putin. According to locals, the Turkish origin of the name, which referred to the seat of a "Hadžija" (a local dignitary), was unsuitable. All 12 households in the village voted in favour of the name change, and the president of Medveđa municipality at the time confirmed that they would not need any special permission to enact the renaming. In September 2018, the construction of a new road was completed, and it was opened in a ceremony attended by Russian ambassador to Serbia Aleksandr Chepurin.

== Economy and society ==
Putinovo, like the rest of the Gornji Gajtan area, has historically had a cattle farming and agriculture-based economy. The village has an inn, which serves local rakija (plum brandy) produced in the village and named Putinovka, also in honour of Vladimir Putin. The village has been described as impoverished, remote and isolated. The nearest school and shop are located nearly 20 kilometres (12 mi) away.

A notable resident of the village is Goran Petronijević, a lawyer who defended Bosnian Serb war criminal Radovan Karadžić at the International Criminal Tribunal for the former Yugoslavia in The Hague.

== Demographics ==
In 2017, NBC News reported the population of the village to be 40. According to a 2018 report by Radio Free Europe, however, of the roughly 20 houses in the village (a number that has also been given as variously 12 or 30), only 2 are inhabited year-round. The village population is also generally elderly.
