= Eugen Schmidt (politician) =

German politician

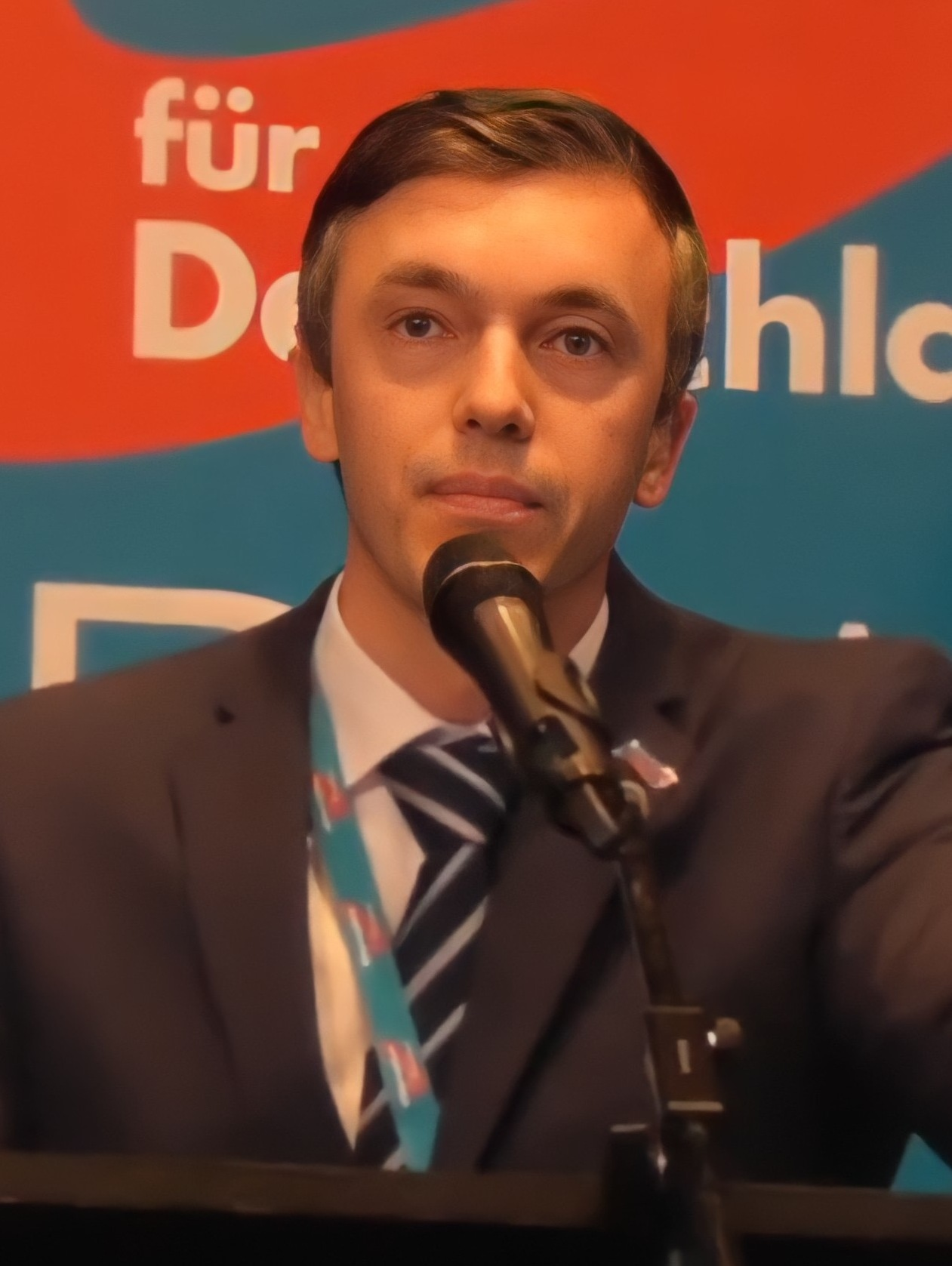

Member of the Bundestag
- In office 26 September 2021 – 23 February 2025

Personal details
- Born: 23 October 1975 (age 50) Ust-Kamenogorsk, Kazakh SSR, Soviet Union
- Party: AfD

Eugen Schmidt (born 23 October 1975 in Ust-Kamenogorsk) is a German politician for the AfD and from 2021 to 2025 member of the Bundestag, the federal parliament.

== Life and politics ==
Schmidt was born 1975 in the city of Oskemen in the Kazakh SSR into a family of German descent and later became a German citizen. Schmidt was elected to the Bundestag in 2021.

Schmidt has maintained a pro-Russian position and his employee Wladimir Sergijenko was confirmed to be a FSB contact.
