= Olga Skabeyeva =

Russian television host (born 1984)

- Ольга Скабеева
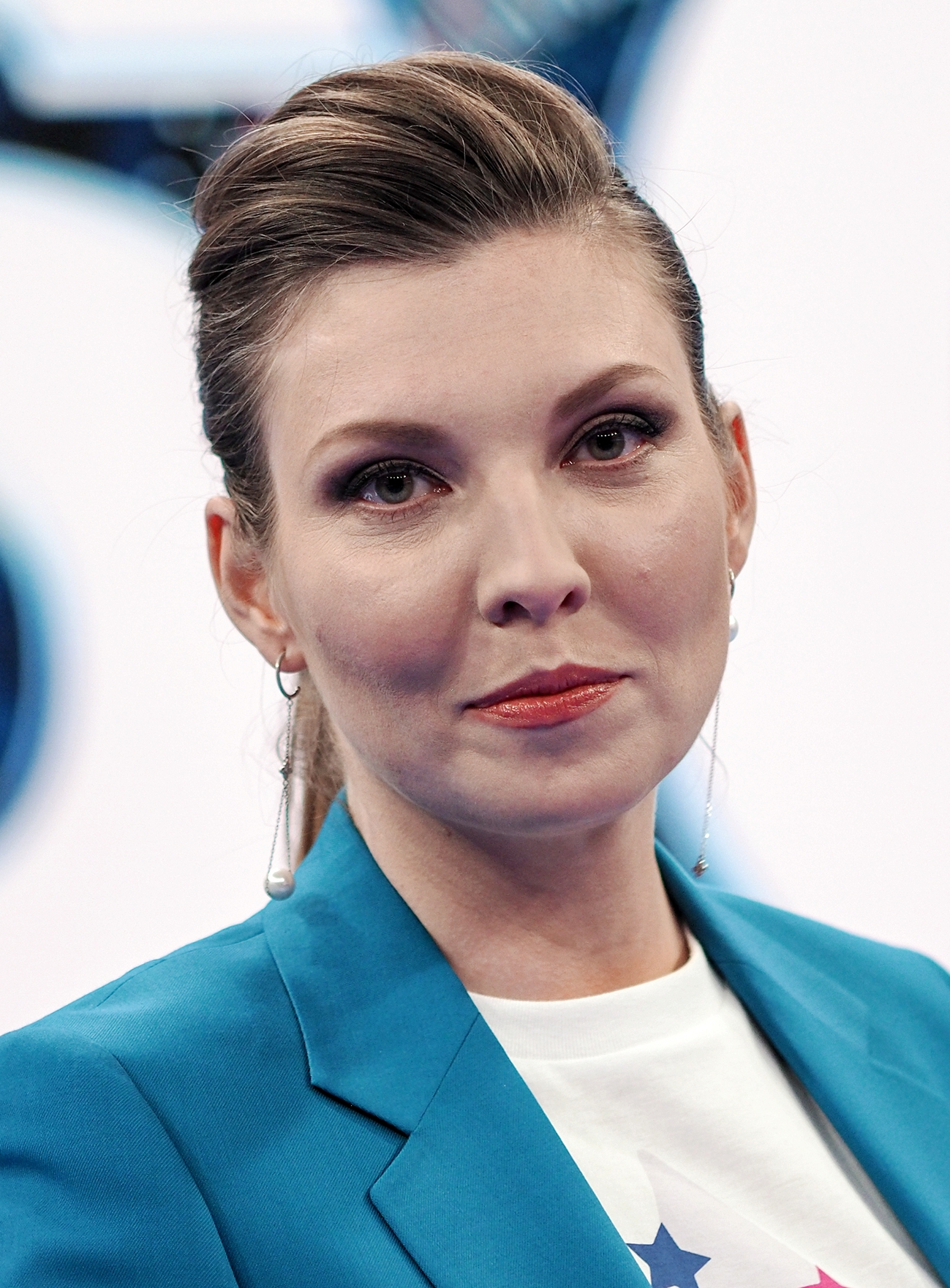
- Skabeyeva in 2019
- Born: 11 December 1984 (age 41); Volzhsky, Russian SFSR, Soviet Union
- Other name: Iron Doll
- Education: Saint Petersburg State University
- Occupations: Television presenter, political pundit, propagandist
- Years active: 2012–present
- Spouse: Yevgeny Popov (m. 2013)

Olga Vladimirovna Skabeyeva (Note: Alternative spelling: Skabeeva) (Russian: Ольга Владимировна Скабеева; born 11 December 1984) is a Russian television presenter and political commentator, commonly described as a governmental propagandist. Skabeyeva is also known by the nickname "Iron Doll of Putin's TV", due to her criticism of the Russian opposition. She is known for supporting the Putin regime and Russia's war against Ukraine.

== Early life and education ==
Skabeyeva was born in 1984 in Volzhsky, in the Volgograd Oblast of the Soviet Union. At first, she studied at a private Russian-American school, from which she graduated with honors.

In the tenth grade, she decided to become a journalist. She studied at the Faculty of Journalism at Saint Petersburg State University, where she graduated from with honors in 2008. Her journalistic career began at a local newspaper.

== Career ==
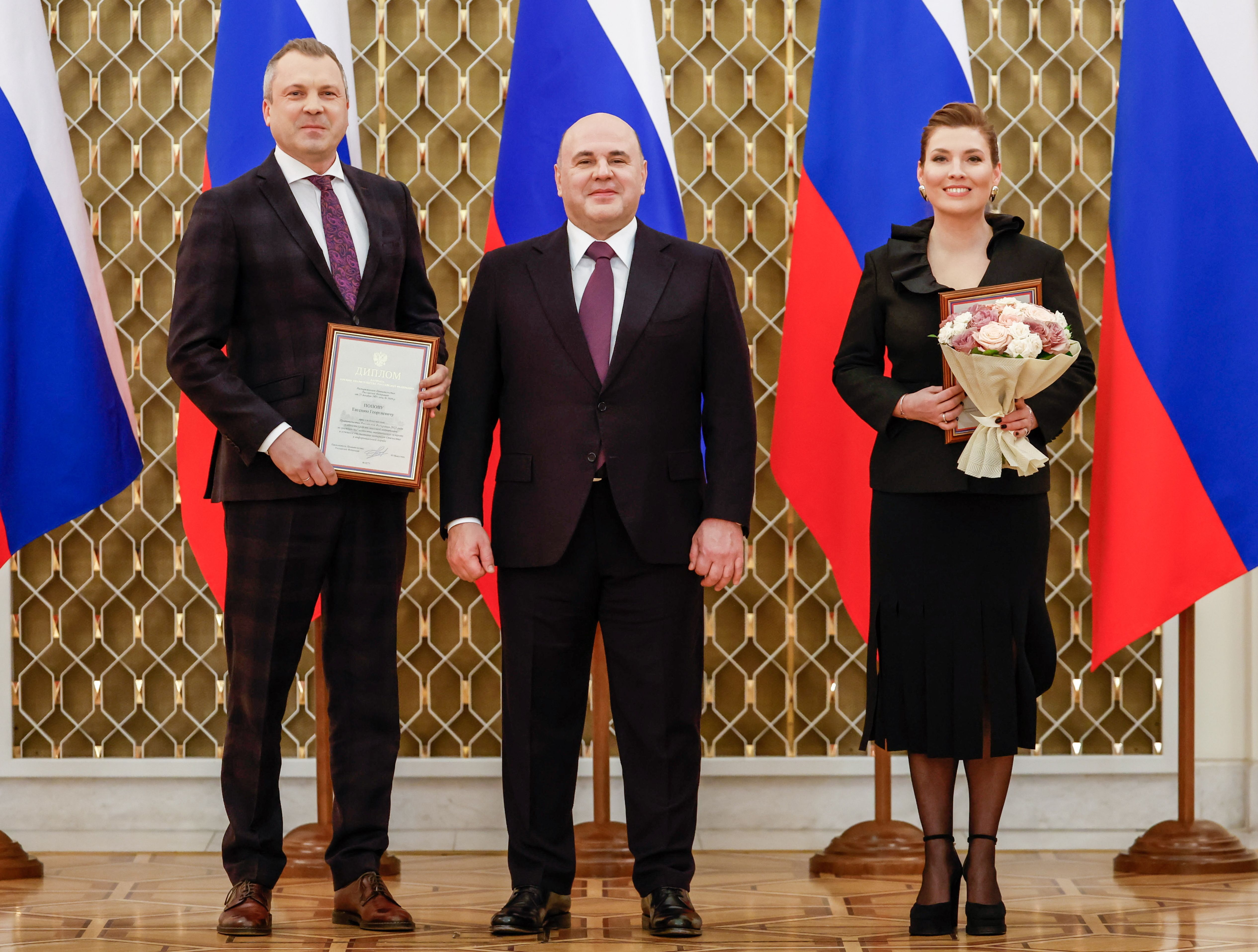
Skabeyeva (right), Russian Prime Minister Mikhail Mishustin (centre) and Yevgeny Popov attend a ceremony to present government awards in the field of mass media for 2023.

Skabeyeva rose to prominence in 2012–2013 with her coverage of the Pussy Riot trial, the concurrent surge in anti-government rallies and subsequent criminal investigations into the activities of Russian opposition supporters. Her critical reports of the Russian opposition prompted TV critic Irina Petrovskaya to describe her as a member of Russian state TV's "special operation forces", and her tone as "prosecutorial and accusatory".

Since 2015–2016, Skabeyeva has hosted the author's program Vesti.doc on the Russia-1 state TV channel. Since 12 September 2016, together with husband Yevgeny Popov, she has hosted the 60 Minut (60 minutes), a social and political talk show on Russia-1, billed as a discussion program on high-profile topics.

In 2018, Skabeyeva was involved in an attempt to discredit the British investigation into the poisoning of Sergei and Yulia Skripal. Her television program said the Skripal poisoning case was 'an elaborate British plot to smear Russia'.

Skabeyeva is a two-time winner of the Russian television TEFI Award, receiving the distinction in 2017 and 2018.

She called the Russian invasion of Ukraine an effort "to protect the people of Donbas from a Nazi regime" and said it was "without exaggeration, a crucial junction in history". On 15 April 2022, she reacted to the sinking of the Russian cruiser Moskva by the Ukrainian forces, saying: "One can safely call that it has escalated into World War III."

In September 2023, she said that Russia should have nuked Queen Elizabeth II's funeral in London.

Skabeyeva criticized Israel's actions in the Gaza Strip during the Gaza war, saying that "Only the Americans can stop this bloodbath but they are doing exactly the opposite."

=== Sanctions ===
Skabeyeva was sanctioned by the United Kingdom on 15 March 2022. On 24 February 2023, the United States Department of State imposed financial sanctions on Skabeyeva and her husband Yevgeny Popov. In a press release, the State Department described them as "hosts of a Russian talk show where they predominately disseminate pro-Russia propaganda for the war against Ukraine." Four days later, she was sanctioned by the European Union.

== Personal life ==
Skabeyeva is married to State Duma member Yevgeny Popov, who is also a co-host of her TV production, for both it was the second marriage. On January 14, 2014 they had a son, Zakhar.

According to an Anti-Corruption Foundation (FBK) investigation published 29 July 2021, Skabeyeva and her husband own real estate in Moscow with a total value of over 300 million rubles (US$4 million). A 2020 investigation by The Insider website found that Skabeyeva officially earns 12.8 million rubles a year, and her husband 12.9 million. Their only reported sources of income are the state-owned media holding VGTRK and its subsidiary TV channel Russia-1.
