= Christian Blex =

German politician (born 1975)

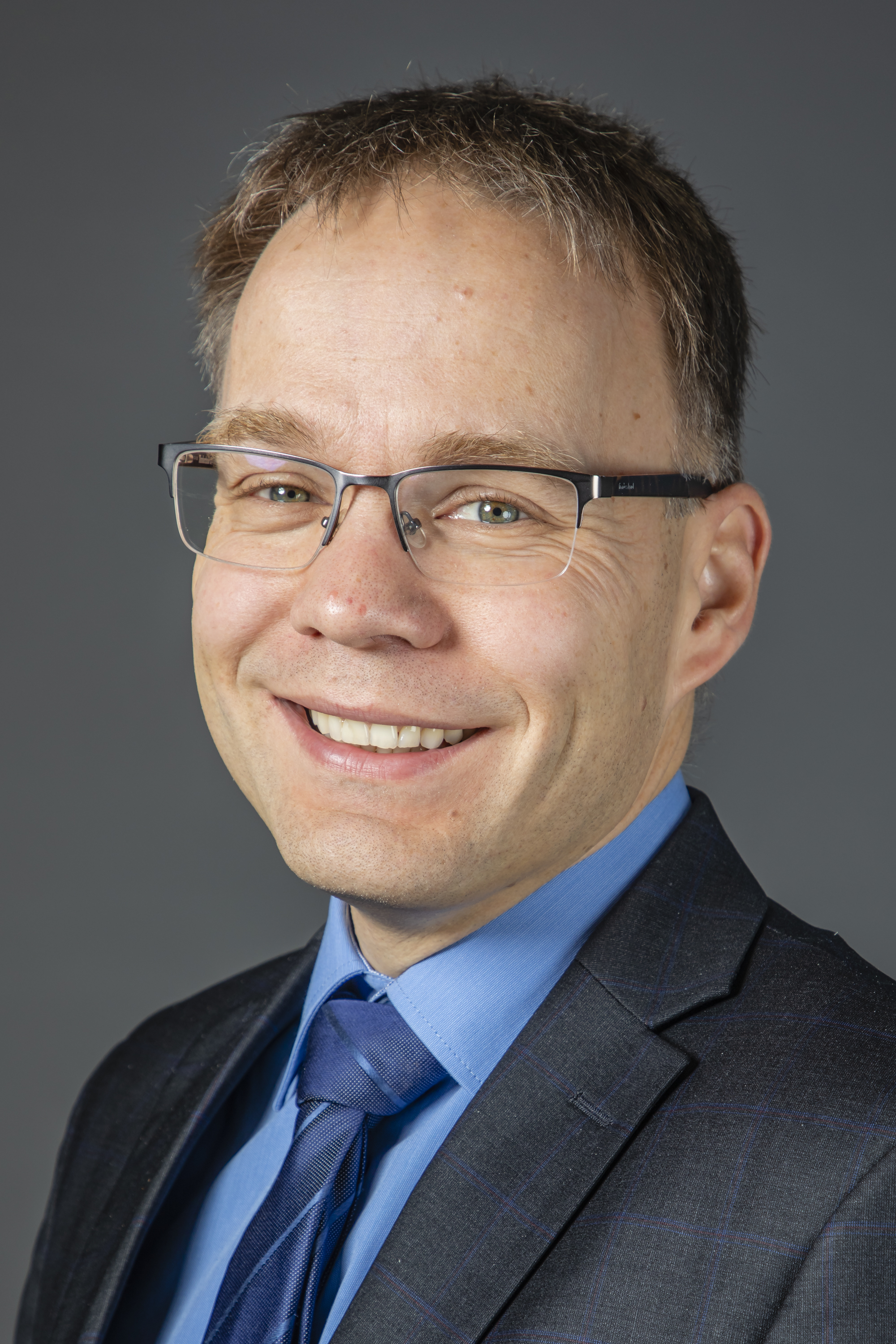
- Blex in 2019

Member of the Landtag of North Rhine-Westphalia
- Incumbent
- Assumed office 1 June 2017

Personal details
- Born: 11 November 1975 (age 50) Lippstadt
- Party: Alternative for Germany (since 2013)

Christian Blex (born 11 November 1975 in Lippstadt) is a German politician serving as a member of the Landtag of North Rhine-Westphalia since 2017. He has served as chairman of the Alternative for Germany in Warendorf since 2013.
