= Jürgen Elsässer =

German journalist and political activist (born 1957)

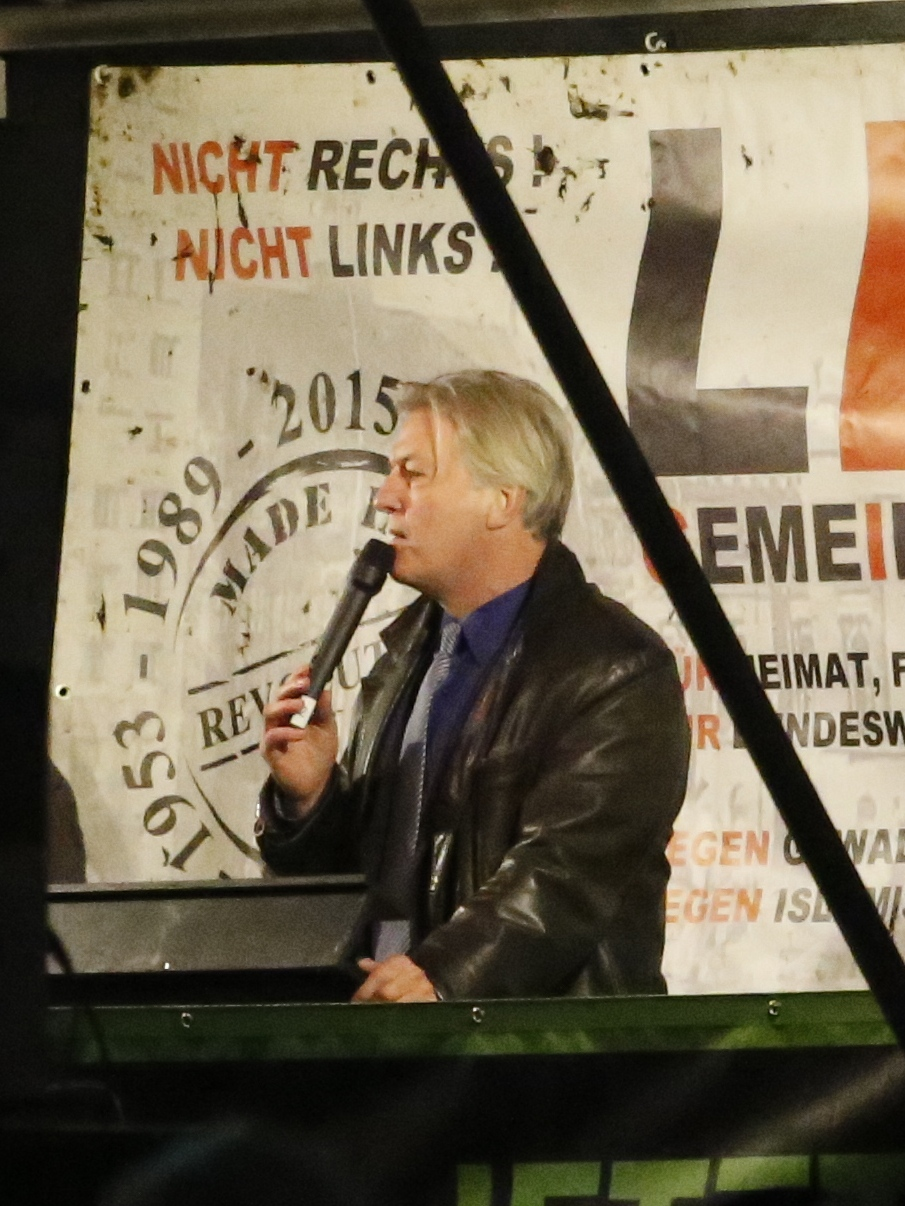
- Elsässer in 2015 at a PEGIDA gathering
- Born: 20 January 1957 (age 69); Pforzheim, Baden-Württemberg, West Germany
- Occupations: Journalist, political activist

Jürgen Elsässer (born 20 January 1957) is a German journalist and far-right political activist. Once active in left-wing circles, he later became a prominent figure in Germany's far-right scene. He is the founder of Compact, a magazine classified as extremist by the BfV in 2021 and banned by the BMI in 2024, though the ban was later overturned, with a final decision pending.

== Life ==
Jürgen Elsässer was born in Pforzheim in 1957, the son of a watchmaker and a secretary. He described himself and his two sisters in their youth as typical admirers of left-wing values, influenced by the 1968 protest movement a few years earlier. His father, in contrast, was a conservative CDU voter.

In order to secure a teaching position, Elsässer pledged support for the Liberal democratic basic order, a prerequisite for employment in the German public sector aimed at preventing political extremists from holding state-funded jobs. At the time, he was still active in communist organizations. He worked as a teacher in a vocational school in Baden-Württemberg for 14 years before beginning his career as journalist for left-wing magazines in 1994. Elsässer published his early works in Arbeiterkampf (Workers' Struggle), a newspaper published by the Kommunistischer Bund (Communist League), an organization he was involved with for several years. In 1990, he was a sharp critic of German reunification, fearing it might lead to the rise of a Viertes Reich (Fourth Reich).

In 2010, he founded Compact magazine, where he continues to serve as editor-in-chief.

In 2011, Elsässer expressed his admiration for Serbian leader Slobodan Milošević. During the 2014 pro-Russian unrest in Ukraine, Elsässer was an outspoken supporter of Russian president Vladimir Putin and received much criticism from the German media for his position. He was a sharp critic of the migration policy of the former German chancellor Angela Merkel.

Since 2016, Elsässer has positioned Compact magazine as a political campaign platform for the far-right AfD. He aims to expand its reach through a Querfront strategy, seeking to unite far-left and far-right groups under nationalist themes.

== Ideological Development ==
Elsässer was one of the political creators of the Anti-Germans movement.

From about 1975 to 2008, Elsässer was an author, editor and co-publisher of various left-wing print media such as “Jungle World”, “junge Welt”, “konkret” and “Neues Deutschland”. In 1994, he was editor of the leftist Junge Welt (Young World). He was also co-editor of the largest left-wing monthly magazine konkret until he was dismissed.

Starting in 2010, Elsässer publicly aligned himself with the far-right movement. Since then, he has promoted positions that are conspiracy-driven, anti-American, pro-Russian, homophobic, and racist. Some of his statements have been classified as anti-Semitic.

== Reception ==
Melanie Amann of Der Spiegel described Elsässer's presence as "a mixture of evangelical preacher and teleshopping moderator", noting his style would "work independently of his message." In a 2018 interview with Der Spiegel, Dietmar Koschmieder (editor in chief of Junge Welt) remarked: "If you ask me, [Elsässer] has no convictions at all... He is an expert at emotional manipulation, adapting his message to suit his target audience."

== Publications ==
- 2010: Der Euro-Crash. Griechenland war nur der Anfang (The Euro crash. Greece was just the beginning). Hoemlius Verlag ISBN 9783897064225
- 2009: Angriff der Heuschrecken. Zerstörung der Nationen und globaler Krieg. (Attack of the locusts. Destruction of nations and global war). Pahl-Rugenstein Nachfolger ISBN 9783891443965
- 1998: Braunbuch DVU. Eine deutsche Arbeiterpartei und ihre Freunde. Vorw. v. Jürgen Trittin (Brownbook DVU. A German workers party and their friends. Preface: Jürgen Trittin). Konkret Literatur Verlag ISBN 9783930786183
