= Alina Lipp =

German social media influencer

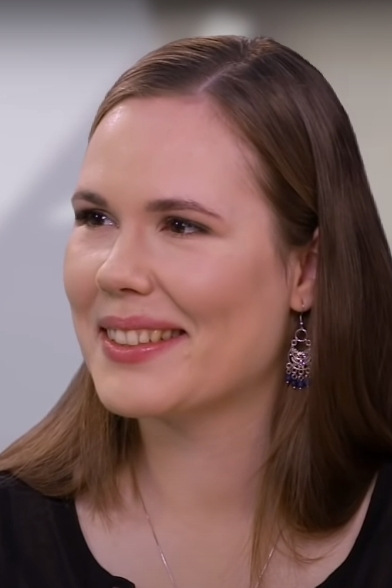
- Lipp in 2022
- Born: 1993 or 1994 (age 32–33); Hamburg, Germany

Alina Lipp is a German social media influencer and self-described independent journalist. She is known for spreading pro-Russian disinformation about the Russian invasion of Ukraine online, including on YouTube and Telegram.

== Career ==
Lipp began her career as an activist with the German Green party. Lipp said she left the party in 2016, after her first stay in Crimea. The Greens state that Lipp was a member of the party from 2015 until her withdrawal in 2020.

Lipp created her YouTube channel, Glücklich auf der Krim (English: Happy in Crimea) in 2019. She created her Telegram, Neues aus Russland (English: News from Russia) in 2021, sharing content in both Russian and German. In addition to her own accounts, Lipp has appeared on a variety of right-wing alternative media outlets. On her social media accounts, she has positioned herself as a war correspondent, delivering news of the war with a pro-Russian spin, including pro-Putin propaganda. Screenings of Lipp's documentaries, "Auf der Suche nach der Wahrheit" (English: "In Search of the Truth") and "Donbass: Der Ursprung des Konflikts" (English: "Donbas: The Origin of the Conflict"), at the Brotfabrik in Pankow prompted protests resulting in the cancellation of the screenings.

Since 2022, Lipp has been investigated by the Lüneburg and Göttingen public prosecutors' offices for publicly supporting the commission of criminal acts, specifically with relation to the Russian invasion of Ukraine. She has framed these investigations as an attack on free speech, a claim which has been repeated by right wing media outlets.

A three-part documentary series about Lipp and her spreading of disinformation, The Princess of Disinformation – Alina Lipp und Putins Krieg (English: The Princess of Disinformation – Alina Lipp and Putin's War), aired on ZDF in 2023.

== Personal life ==
Lipp grew up in Northern Germany and is the daughter of a Russian immigrant father and a German mother. She studied sustainability at Lüneburg University.
