= Richard Gutjahr =

German TV presenter and blogger (born 1973)

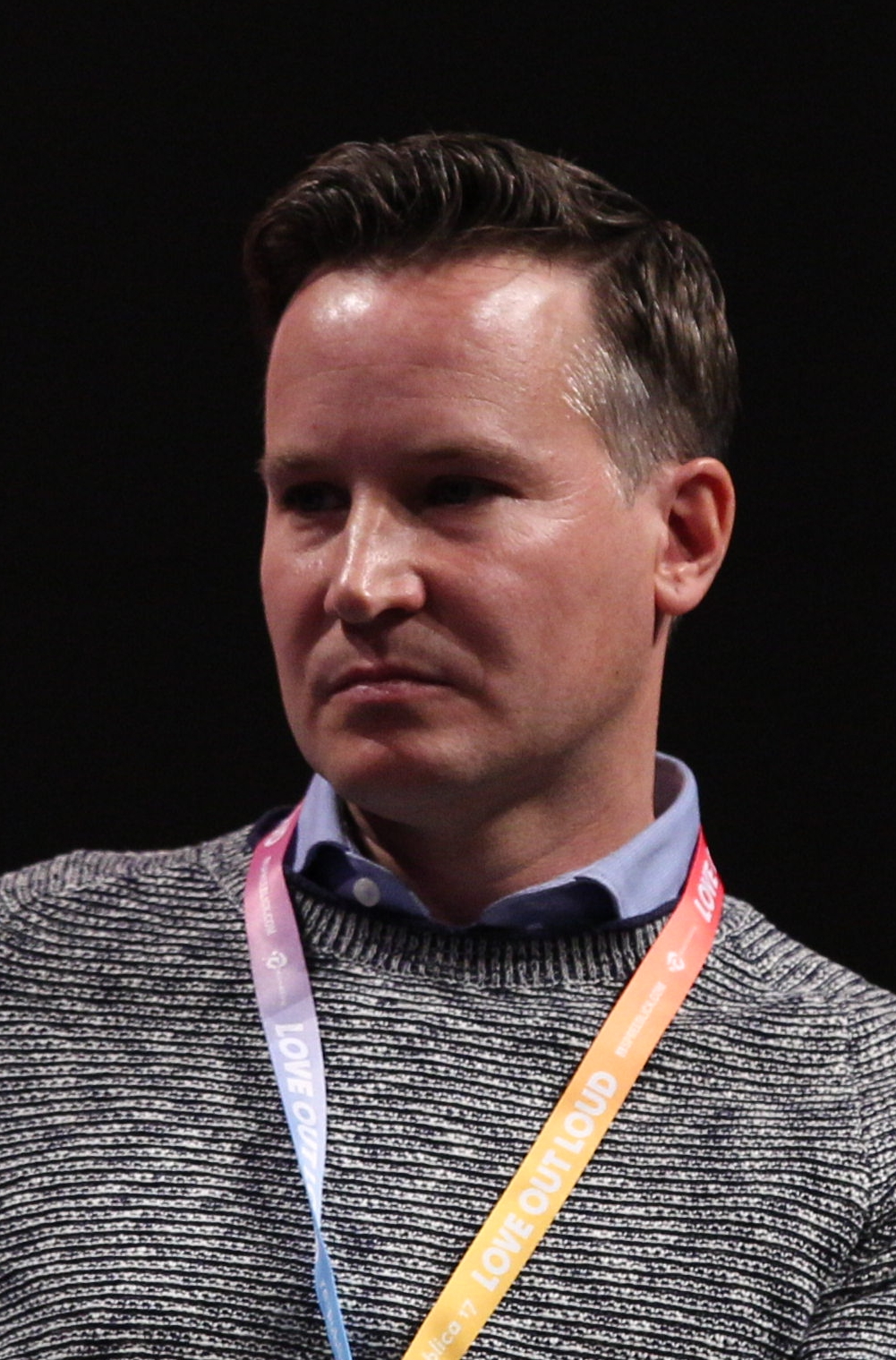

Richard Gutjahr (German pronunciation: [ˈʁɪçaʁt ˈɡuːtjaːɐ̯]; born 1973 in Bonn) is a German TV presenter and blogger. He is known for covering the terror attacks in Nice and Munich in mid-2016 with a mobile phone, and he "explained how basic mobile technology allowed him to cover the two attacks".

== Training and affiliations ==
Gutjahr is an alumnus of the German School of Journalism in Munich where he studied from 1993-1998. During this time he also studied political science and communications studies at LMU Munich. He completed his studies with a degree in journalism. He took part in an exchange of the Centre de formation des journalistes of Paris and between 1998 and 1999 in a semester program of the American University in Washington, D.C.

From 1992 to 1996, he worked as a news editor, live reporter and presenter for Radio Gong, followed by a stint at Bayern 3 from 1996 to 1999. For the Süddeutsche Zeitung, Gutjahr worked as a freelancer and cartoonist. From January 1999, he spent five months as an intern for the CNN office in Washington. He subsequently worked for the national German public television channel Das Erste and its regional outlet for Bavaria, Bayerischer Rundfunk, where, among other things he hosted a program called "Live aus dem Alabama", a live broadcast from a popular concert venue.

Gutjahr currently works for Bayerischer Rundfunk, hosting the late night edition of Rundschau, Rundschau Nacht (Rundschau Night). In spring 2012, Gutjahr developed and hosted a social media TV format; called Rundshow, it ran from 14 May to 7 June 2012, with alternating co-hosts, including Daniel Fiene, Sascha Lobo and Sandra Riess. He also writes a weekly column since mid-2010 in the Abendzeitung. He also writes for other newspapers, including the Berliner Tagesspiegel and Frankfurter Allgemeine Zeitung.

== Coverage of the Egyptian Revolution ==
Gutjahr traveled to Cairo during the Egyptian revolution of 2011 and used social media for reporting, when all he could use was his smartphone, because the internet had been blocked by the Egyptian regime.

== Web platform against lobbyists ==
Gutjahr was a co-initiator of LobbyPlag, a web platform aimed at publicizing the influence of lobbyists on politicians in connection with the proposed EU Data Protection Regulation. The research results, which may prove among other things that parliamentarians have written off large parts of their bills from lobbies, made international headlines.

== In Nice and Munich ==
On 14 July 2016 Gutjahr was on vacation in Nice, when the city was struck by a terrorist attack He reported on Twitter and in the ARD night magazine (Nachtmagazin) and the Bayerischer Rundfunk. He made available to the WDR German television network a video that apparently shows the beginning of the attack; he explicitly objected to publishing the material on social networks, because he wanted to leave it to professional journalists to decide which images should be shown.

On 22 July 2016 Gutjahr was reporting live for the national news program Tagesschau and other media about the shooting rampage at the Olympia-Einkaufszentrum in Munich. Originally en route to the Bayerischer Rundfunk, he said that he was alerted by his daughter about the incident and arrived as one of the first reporters at the scene.

His coincidental presence at events gave rise to conspiracy theories, alleging his presence at both events could not have been a coincidence. Gutjahr has pressed charges against those who make the allegations, which he sees mostly motivated by antisemitism against his wife considering the often antisemitic nature of the hostilities. Siegmund Gottlieb, the German chief editor of the "Bayerischer Rundfunk", voiced his support. A German court ultimately ruled against Gutjahr.

== Personal life ==
Gutjahr has been married to former Israeli Knesset member and ex-intelligence officer Einat Wilf since 2007. They have a son, born in 2010. Gutjahr also has a daughter, born in 1994.

== Awards ==
Jointly with Rundschau editorial director Peter Marten Gutjahr received the Ernst Schneider Award for Business Journalism in 2006. The newspaper Die Zeit named him in early 2012 the Networked Journalist of the Year 2011; Medium Magazin (media magazine) called him the 2011 "Newcomer of the Year". In 2013, the Grimme Institute honored Richard Gutjahr for his personal achievement. It was the first time in the history of the Grimme Online Awards that such a prize was given to an individual.

== Writings ==
- G! book: 50 ausgewählte Blogposts von Gutjahrs Blog, epubli 2012, ISBN 3-8442-1735-5
