= AfD Saxony-Anhalt =

AfD Saxony-Anhalt AfD Sachsen-Anhalt
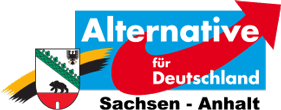
- Leader: Martin Reichardt
- Founded: 5 April 2013; 13 years ago
- Headquarters: Schönebecker Strasse 11-13 39104 Magdeburg
- Membership (2020): 1,366
- Ideology: Right-wing populism
- Political position: Far-right
- National affiliation: Alternative for Germany
- Colours: Light blue
- Landtag of Saxony-Anhalt: 39 / 83
- Bundestag delegation: 4 / 18

Website
- https://afd-lsa.de/
- Politics of Germany; Political parties; Elections; A: The AfD is considered to be part of the radical right, a subset of the far-right that does not oppose democracy.

The AfD Saxony-Anhalt is the state association of the Alternative for Germany (AfD) party in the state of Saxony-Anhalt. The state association is led by the member of parliament Martin Reichardt as state chairman. With André Poggenburg as the top candidate, the AfD Sachsen-Anhalt ran for the first time in a state election in 2016 and subsequently represented the second largest parliamentary group in the seventh state parliament of Saxony-Anhalt.

In January 2021, the Office for the Protection of the Constitution of Saxony-Anhalt classified it as a suspected right-wing extremist movement. In November 2023, the state association was classified as a “definite right-wing extremist effort”. This classification gives the State Office for the Protection of the Constitution in Saxony-Anhalt broader discretion in using intelligence efforts to monitor the group.

On October 2026, Tobias Rausch from the AfD was elected speaker of Saxony-Anhalt's state parliament. This was the AfD party's first time in such position and the first time a far-right party has held such a post in the country since 1945. Hans-Thomas Tillschneider was elected deputy speaker.

== History ==
At the 2026 Saxony-Anhalt state election, AfD got 43,8 percent of the votes. All other parties refused to work with AfD, except the BSW, who were indifferent. The BSW narrowly entered the state parliament with 5.3 percent and considered abstaining during the parliamentary vote for the Minister-President.

Lead candidate Ulrich Siegmund promised, before and after the election, that he would only become Minister-President if he was elected in the first ballot in the state parliament. His party leader, Alice Weidel, contradicted him: "Ulrich Siegmund will become Minister-President—whether in the first, second, or third round of voting. It doesn´t matter for us."

== Controversies ==
The AfD parliamentary group in the state parliament of Saxony-Anhalt called for a demonstration in Magdeburg at the end of January 2022 against the CORONA protective measures. It remained unclear whether the AfD Saxony-Anhalt or the AfD parliamentary group organized and financed the demonstration. The parliamentary group receives state money and is therefore forbidden to finance political events.

== AfD fraction in Landtag ==
In the last Landtag of Saxony-Anhalt, the AfD fraction consisted of 2 women and 21 men:

	Name
1	Matthias Büttner
2	Matthias Büttner
3	Christian Hecht
4	Oliver Kirchner
5	Gordon Köhler
6	Hagen Kohl
7	Nadine Koppehel
8	Thomas Korell
9	Matthias Lieschke
10	Frank Lizureck
11	Hannes Loth
12	Jan Moldenhauer
13	Daniel Rausch
14	Tobias Rausch
15	Daniel Roi
16	Jan Scharfenort
17	Florian Schröder
18	Thomas Korell
19	Hans-Thomas Tillschneider
20	Lothar Waehler
21	Daniel Wald
22	Margret Wendt
23	Felix Zietmann

== Stategroup in Deutschen Bundestag ==
=== Since 2025 ===
MoP	Elected by	function / membership
Martin Reichardt	Listenplatz 1	State chairmen
Jan Wenzel Schmidt	Direktmandat	not longer part of AfD group in Bundestag
Christina Baum	Direktmandat Anhalt	
Thomas Korell	Direktmandat	–
Volker Scheurell	Direktmandat	
Claudia Weiss	Direktmandat Magdeburg	
Kay-Uwe Ziegler	Direktmandat	

=== 2021–2025 ===
MoP	Elected by	function / membership
Martin Reichardt	Listenplatz 1	State chairmen
Jan Wenzel Schmidt	Listenplatz 2	member of state board
Kay-Uwe Ziegler	Direktmandat Anhalt	Vice state chairmen
Robert Farle	Direktmandat Mansfeld	–

== Election results ==
State Parliament (Landtag)

State election, year	No. of overall votes	% of overall vote & ranking	No. of overall seats won	+/–
Saxony-Anhalt, 2016	272,496	24.4 (#2)	25 / 87	
Saxony-Anhalt, 2021	221,487	20.8 (#2)	23 / 87	▼2
Saxony-Anhalt, 2026	576,037	43.8 (#1)	39 / 83	▲16

== See also ==
- AfD Thuringia
- AfD Saxony
- AfD Brandenburg
- AfD Saxony-Anhalt
- New states of Germany
