= Burgenland – Saalekreis =

Federal electoral district of Germany

72 Burgenland – Saalekreis
- Electoral district for the Bundestag
- Burgenland – Saalekreis in 2025
- State: Saxony-Anhalt
- Population: 225,700 (2019)
- Electorate: 184,352 (2021)
- Major settlements: Weißenfels; Merseburg; Naumburg
- Area: 1,753.27 km^{2}

Current electoral district
- Created: 1990
- Party: AfD
- Member: Martin Reichardt
- Elected: 2025

Burgenland – Saalekreis is an electoral constituency (German: Wahlkreis) represented in the Bundestag. It elects one member via first-past-the-post voting. Under the current constituency numbering system, it is designated as constituency 72. It is located in southern Saxony-Anhalt, comprising the Burgenlandkreis distinct and eastern parts of the Saalekreis district.

Burgenland – Saalekreis was created for the inaugural 1990 federal election after German reunification. From 2009 to 2025, it was represented by Dieter Stier of the Christian Democratic Union (CDU). Since 2025 it has been represented by Martin Reichardt of the AfD.

== Geography ==
Burgenland – Saalekreis is located in southern Saxony-Anhalt. As of the 2025 federal election, it comprises the entirety of the Burgenlandkreis district and the municipalities of Bad Dürrenberg, Braunsbedra, Leuna, Merseburg, and Schkopau from Saalekreis district.

== History ==
Burgenland – Saalekreis was created after German reunification in 1990, then known as Zeitz – Hohenmölsen – Naumburg – Nebra. In the 2002 and 2005 elections, it was named Burgenland. It acquired its current name in the 2009 election. In the 1990 through 1998 elections, it was constituency 294 in the numbering system. In the 2002 through 2009 elections, it was number 74. In the 2013 through 2021 elections, it was number 73. From the 2025 election, it has been number 72.

Originally, it comprised the districts of Zeitz, Hohenmölsen, Naumburg, and Nebra. It acquired its current borders in the 2002 election, but without the municipality of Merseburg. Merseburg was acquired ahead of the 2025 election.

Election	No.	Name	Borders
1990	294	Zeitz – Hohenmölsen – Naumburg – Nebra	Zeitz district; Hohenmölsen district; Naumburg district; Nebra district
1994	294	Zeitz – Hohenmölsen – Naumburg – Nebra	Zeitz district; Hohenmölsen district; Naumburg district; Nebra district
1998	294	Zeitz – Hohenmölsen – Naumburg – Nebra	Zeitz district; Hohenmölsen district; Naumburg district; Nebra district
2002	74	Burgenland	Burgenlandkreis district; Saalekreis district (only Bad Dürrenberg, Braunsbedra, Leuna, and Schkopau municipalities)
2005	74	Burgenland	Burgenlandkreis district; Saalekreis district (only Bad Dürrenberg, Braunsbedra, Leuna, and Schkopau municipalities)
2009	74	Burgenland – Saalekreis	Burgenlandkreis district; Saalekreis district (only Bad Dürrenberg, Braunsbedra, Leuna, and Schkopau municipalities)
2013	73	Burgenland – Saalekreis	Burgenlandkreis district; Saalekreis district (only Bad Dürrenberg, Braunsbedra, Leuna, and Schkopau municipalities)
2017	73	Burgenland – Saalekreis	Burgenlandkreis district; Saalekreis district (only Bad Dürrenberg, Braunsbedra, Leuna, and Schkopau municipalities)
2021	73	Burgenland – Saalekreis	Burgenlandkreis district; Saalekreis district (only Bad Dürrenberg, Braunsbedra, Leuna, and Schkopau municipalities)
2025	72	Burgenland – Saalekreis	Burgenlandkreis district; Saalekreis district (only Bad Dürrenberg, Braunsbedra, Leuna, Merseburg, and Schkopau municipalities)

== Members ==
The constituency was first represented by Harald Schreiber of the Christian Democratic Union (CDU) from 1990 to 1994, followed by Margarete Späte from 1994 to 1998. It was won by the Social Democratic Party (SPD) in 1998, and Eckhart Lewering served until 2005, followed by Maik Reichel until 2009. Dieter Stier of the CDU was elected in 2009, and re-elected in 2013, 2017, and 2021.

Election	Member	Party	%
1990	Harald Schreiber	CDU	45.5
1994	Margarete Späte	CDU	43.6
1998	Eckhart Lewering	SPD	38.6
2002	Eckhart Lewering	SPD	35.5
2005	Maik Reichel	SPD	31.6
2009	Dieter Stier	CDU	33.0
2013	Dieter Stier	CDU	44.8
2017	Dieter Stier	CDU	34.0
2021	Dieter Stier	CDU	26.3
2025	Martin Reichardt	AfD	44.4

== Election results ==
=== 2025 ===
Federal election (2025): Burgenland – Saalekreis
Notes:	Blue background denotes the winner of the electorate vote. Pink background denotes a candidate elected from their party list. Yellow background denotes an electorate win by a list member, or other incumbent. A ✓ or ✗ denotes status of any incumbent, win or lose respectively.						
Party	Candidate	Votes	%	±%	Party votes	%	±%
AfD	Martin Reichardt	69,071	44.4	▲18.7	66,134	42.3	▲17.7
CDU	✗ Dieter Stier	37,716	24.2	▼1.7	29,389	18.8	▼2.4
BSW					18,090	11.6	New
Left	Michael Scholz	17,032	10.9	▲1.0	13,524	8.7	▲0.1
SPD	Norman Steigleder	15,652	10.1	▼12.1	14,168	9.1	▼13.9
FW	Rebecca Resch	6,312	4.1	▲3.7	2,381	1.5	▲0.2
FDP	Moritz Eichelmann	4,615	3.0	▼6.4	5,127	3.3	▼6.9
Greens	Enrico Gemsa	3,751	2.4	▼1.1	4,583	2.9	▼1.2
Independent	Matthias Sanftleben	1,428	0.9	New			
PARTEI					1,261	0.8	0.0
Volt					1,010	0.6	▲0.5
BD					430	0.3	New
MLPD					109	0.1	0.0
Informal votes		1,771			1,142		
Total valid votes		155,577			156,206		
Turnout		157,348	77.3	▲9.5			
AfD gain from CDU	Majority	31,355	20.2	N/A			

=== 2021 ===
Federal election (2021): Burgenland – Saalekreis
Notes:	Blue background denotes the winner of the electorate vote. Pink background denotes a candidate elected from their party list. Yellow background denotes an electorate win by a list member, or other incumbent. A ✓ or ✗ denotes status of any incumbent, win or lose respectively.						
Party	Candidate	Votes	%	±%	Party votes	%	±%
CDU	✓ Dieter Stier	32,649	26.3	▼7.3	26,535	21.3	▼8.6
AfD	Martin Reichardt	32,328	26.0	▲2.7	31,000	24.9	▲0.3
SPD	Jens Wojtyscha	27,165	21.9	▲8.7	28,460	22.8	▲9.6
Left	Birke Bull-Bischoff	12,419	10.0	▼6.9	10,630	8.5	▼7.8
FDP	Carsten Sonntag	11,764	9.5	▲2.8	12,785	10.3	▲2.4
Greens	Martina Hoffmann	4,207	3.4	▲0.9	5,002	4.0	▲1.4
dieBasis	Jens Jahr	3,761	3.0		2,647	2.1	
FW					1,629	1.3	0.0
Tierschutzpartei					1,507	1.2	
Tierschutzallianz					1,184	1.0	▼0.4
PARTEI					1,006	0.8	▼0.1
Gartenpartei					761	0.6	▲0.3
NPD					412	0.3	▼0.8
Pirates					404	0.3	
Volt					158	0.1	
du.					156	0.1	
Humanists					121	0.1	
MLPD					99	0.1	0.0
ÖDP					83	0.1	
Informal votes		1,573			1,287		
Total valid votes		124,293			124,579		
Turnout		125,866	68.3	▼0.2			
CDU hold	Majority	321	0.3	▼9.9			

=== 2017 ===
Federal election (2017): Burgenland – Saalekreis
Notes:	Blue background denotes the winner of the electorate vote. Pink background denotes a candidate elected from their party list. Yellow background denotes an electorate win by a list member, or other incumbent. A ✓ or ✗ denotes status of any incumbent, win or lose respectively.						
Party	Candidate	Votes	%	±%	Party votes	%	±%
CDU	✓ Dieter Stier	43,254	33.6	▼11.3	38,678	29.9	▼12.9
AfD	Uwe Gewiese	30,112	23.4		31,781	24.6	▲20.3
Left	Birke Bull-Bischoff	21,819	16.9	▼8.8	21,042	16.3	▼7.5
SPD	Hans-Jürgen Schmidt	16,930	13.1	▼2.3	17,098	13.2	▼3.1
FDP	Eiko Precht	8,538	6.6	▲5.1	10,132	7.8	▲5.1
FW	Ronny Schneider	3,495	2.7	▲0.6	1,687	1.3	▼0.1
Greens	Miriam Matz	3,198	2.5	▼1.4	3,366	2.6	▼0.5
Tierschutzallianz					1,768	1.4	
NPD	Steffen Thiel	1,569	1.2	▼2.8	1,470	1.1	▼2.1
PARTEI					1,127	0.9	
MG					407	0.3	
BGE					315	0.2	
DiB					207	0.2	
MLPD					134	0.1	0.0
Informal votes		2,304			2,007		
Total valid votes		128,915			129,212		
Turnout		131,219	68.5	▲6.9			
CDU hold	Majority	13,142	10.2	▼8.9			

=== 2013 ===
Federal election (2013): Burgenland – Saalekreis
Notes:	Blue background denotes the winner of the electorate vote. Pink background denotes a candidate elected from their party list. Yellow background denotes an electorate win by a list member, or other incumbent. A ✓ or ✗ denotes status of any incumbent, win or lose respectively.						
Party	Candidate	Votes	%	±%	Party votes	%	±%
CDU	✓ Dieter Stier	54,544	44.8	▲11.8	52,194	42.8	▲11.0
Left	Roland Claus	31,300	25.7	▼6.0	28,933	23.7	▼8.1
SPD	Florian Hüfner	18,791	15.4	▼3.4	19,850	16.3	▲0.7
AfD					5,234	4.3	
NPD	Hans Püschel	4,854	4.0	▲0.5	3,920	3.2	▲0.2
Greens	Dieter Kmietczyk	4,760	3.9	▲0.8	3,732	3.1	▼0.7
FW	Günther Weiße	2,581	2.1		1,695	1.4	
Pirates	Manfred Dott	2,488	2.0		2,097	1.7	▼0.3
FDP	Florian Hüfner	1,879	1.5	▼7.4	3,374	2.8	▼8.6
PRO					475	0.4	
Independent	Erich Jaschkowski	442	0.4				
ÖDP					192	0.2	
MLPD					151	0.1	▼0.1
Informal votes		2,170			1,962		
Total valid votes		121,639			121,847		
Turnout		123,809	61.6	▲2.0			
CDU hold	Majority	23,244	19.1	▲17.8			

=== 2009 ===
Federal election (2009): Burgenland – Saalekreis
Notes:	Blue background denotes the winner of the electorate vote. Pink background denotes a candidate elected from their party list. Yellow background denotes an electorate win by a list member, or other incumbent. A ✓ or ✗ denotes status of any incumbent, win or lose respectively.						
Party	Candidate	Votes	%	±%	Party votes	%	±%
CDU	Dieter Stier	41,281	33.0	▲3.6	39,777	31.8	▲5.8
Left	Roland Claus	39,610	31.7	▲5.5	39,876	31.9	▲5.3
SPD	✗ Maik Reichel	23,592	18.9	▼12.7	19,513	15.6	▼14.0
FDP	Wolf-Henry Dreblow	11,224	9.0	▲3.3	14,153	11.3	▲2.3
NPD	Andreas Karl	4,399	3.5	▼1.1	3,792	3.0	▼1.2
Greens	Jochen Dreetz	3,950	3.2	▲1.0	4,740	3.8	▲0.5
Pirates					2,541	2.0	
Independent	Erich Jaschkowski	912	0.7				
DVU					380	0.3	
MLPD					257	0.2	▼0.1
Informal votes		2,535			2,474		
Total valid votes		124,968			125,029		
Turnout		127,503	59.6	▼10.6			
CDU gain from SPD	Majority	1,671	1.3				

=== 2005 election ===
Federal election (2005):Burgenland – Saalekreis
Notes:	Blue background denotes the winner of the electorate vote. Pink background denotes a candidate elected from their party list. Yellow background denotes an electorate win by a list member, or other incumbent. A ✓ or ✗ denotes status of any incumbent, win or lose respectively.						
Party	Candidate	Votes	%	±%	Party votes	%	±%
SPD	Maik Reichel	47,739	31.6	▼4.0	44,757	29.6	▼11.1
CDU	Dieter Stier	44,587	29.5	▼5.0	39,413	26.0	▼5.3
Left	Roland Claus	39,635	26.2	▲9.6	40,293	26.6	▲11.7
FDP	Jens-Uwe Droese	8,551	5.7	▼2.1	13,592	9.0	▲1.4
NPD	Andreas Karl	7,039	4.7	▲3.1	6,361	4.2	▲2.7
Greens	Gunter Walther	3,235	2.1	▼1.0	5,023	3.3	▲0.8
Pro German Center – Pro D-Mark Initiative					617	0.4	
REP					591	0.4	
MLPD					492	0.3	
PBC	Dieter Steffen	482	0.3	▲0.1			
Schill					166	0.1	
Informal votes		3,842			3,805		
Total valid votes		151,268			151,305		
Turnout		155,110	70.2	▲1.7			
SPD hold	Majority	3,152	2.1				
