= Hecht =

Hecht may refer to:

- Hecht (surname)
- Hecht, a pop rock band from Lucerne, Switzerland.
- Hecht's, a chain of department stores, also known as Hecht Brothers, Hecht Bros. and the Hecht Company
- Hecht Museum at Haifa University in Israel
- Hecht (submarine), a German World War II two-person submarine
- Wolfpack Hecht ("Pike"), a group of German World War II U-boats
- Hecht is a gymnastics dismount skill performed on the horizontal bar or uneven bars
- Hecht vault, a type of vault in gymnastics

== See also ==
- Justice Hecht (disambiguation)
