= History of Germany (1990–present) =

Reunification era

Since 1990, Germany spans the period following German reunification, when West Germany and East Germany were reunited after being divided during the Cold War. It is referred to by historians as the Berlin Republic (Berliner Republik), or as the Third German Republic. This time period is also determined by the ongoing process of the "inner reunification" of the formerly divided country.

== Economics ==
=== Stagnation in 1990s ===
After the fall of the Berlin Wall, a wave of optimism for a more positive future swept across Germany, but that future proved difficult to realize. Western Germany invested over two trillion marks in the rehabilitation of the former East Germany, helping it to transition to a market economy and cleaning up the environmental degradation. By 2011 the results were mixed, with slow economic development in the East, in sharp contrast to the rapid economic growth in both west and southern Germany. Unemployment was much higher in the East, often over 15%. Economists Snower and Merkl (2006) suggest that the malaise was prolonged by all the social and economic help from the German government, pointing especially to bargaining by proxy, high unemployment benefits and welfare entitlements, and generous job-security provisions.

The German economic miracle petered out in the 1990s, so that by the end of the century and the early 2000s it was ridiculed as "the sick man of Europe." It suffered a short recession in 2003. The economic growth rate was a very low 1.2% annually from 1988 to 2005. Unemployment, especially in the eastern districts, remained stubbornly high despite heavy stimulus spending. It rose from 9.2% in 1998 to 11.1% in 2009. The worldwide Great Recession of 2008-2010 worsened conditions briefly, as there was a sharp decline in GDP. However unemployment did not rise, and recovery was faster than almost anywhere else. The old industrial centers of the Rhineland and North Germany lagged as well, as the coal and steel industries faded in importance.

=== Resurgence after 2010 ===
The economic policies were heavily oriented toward the world market, and the export sector continued to be very strong. Prosperity was pulled along by exports that reached a record of $1.7 trillion US dollars in 2011, or half of the German GDP, or nearly 8% of all of the exports in the world. While the rest of the European Community struggled with financial issues, Germany took a conservative position based on an extraordinarily strong economy after 2010. The labor market proved flexible, and the export industries were attuned to world demand.

As of December 2023, Germany is the fourth largest economy in the world after the United States, China and Japan and the largest economy in Europe. It is the third largest export nation in the world.

== Political History ==
=== Chancellorship of Helmut Kohl in a reunited Germany (1990–1998) ===
==== Five new states ====
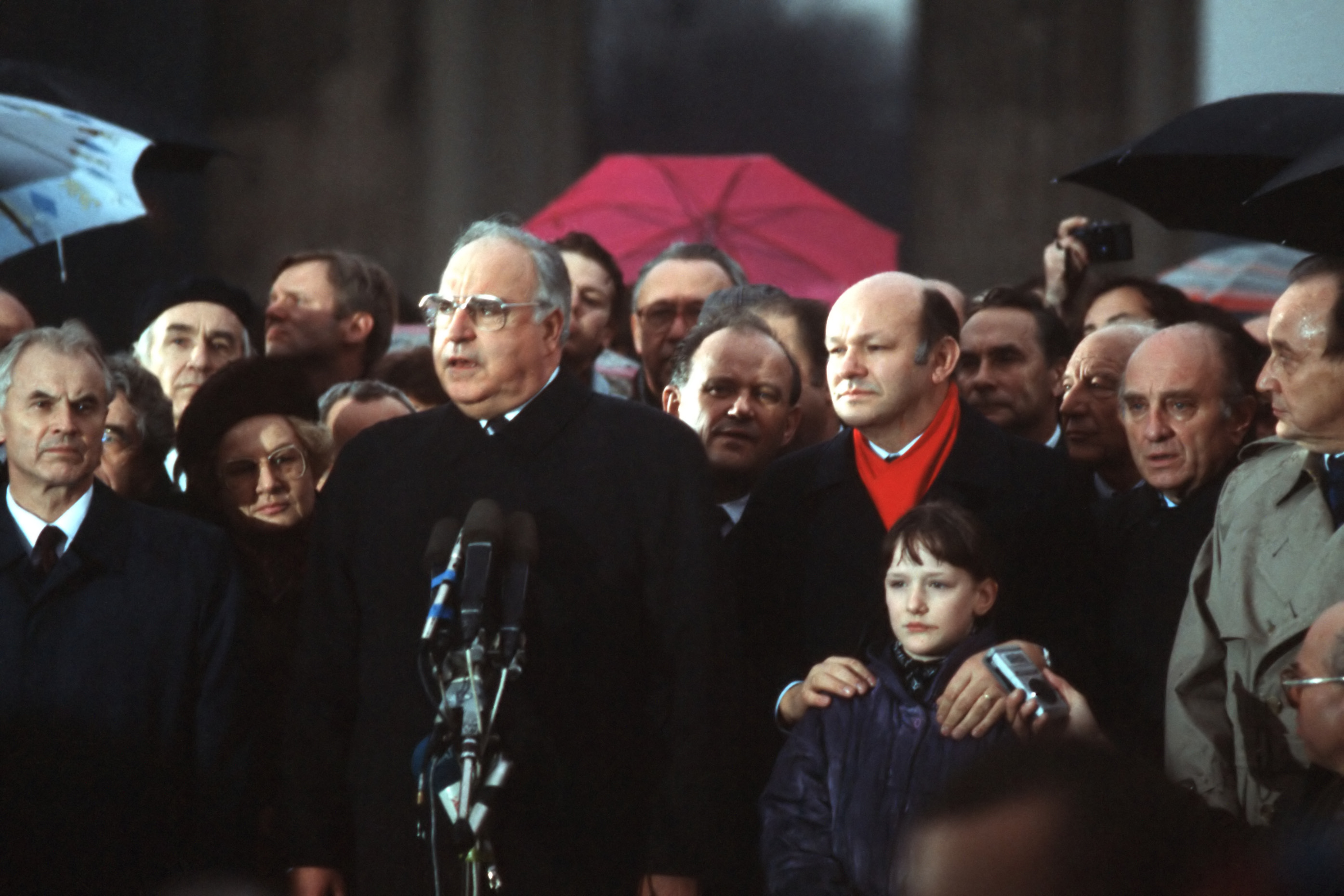
Helmut Kohl after the fall of the Berlin Wall in 1989

On October 3, 1990, the German Democratic Republic was dissolved, five states were recreated (Brandenburg, Mecklenburg-Vorpommern, Saxony, Saxony-Anhalt and Thuringia) and the new states became part of the Federal Republic of Germany, an event known as the German Reunification.

Elections for new state parliaments were held in the five states on October 14, and the Christian Democratic Union of Germany became the largest party in all states except Brandenburg, where the Social Democratic Party of Germany became the largest party.

The reunified Berlin became the capital of Germany on October 3, although the government continued to have its seat in Bonn until 1999. December 2 marks the first elections for the city parliament after reunification.

==== Kohl's fourth term, 1991–1994 ====
The first federal election after reunification, the 1990 federal election, took place on December 2 in that year. The CDU became the largest party with 43.8%, followed by the SPD (33.5%) and the Free Democratic Party of Germany (11%).

On June 20, 1991, the Bundestag decided that the parliament and parts of the government and central administration would be relocated from Bonn to the capital, Berlin. At this time, the term "Berlin Republic" (alluding to the Cold War era "Bonn Republic" and the interwar period "Weimar Republic") emerged.

Roman Herzog, a former Judge at the Federal Constitutional Court of Germany, was elected President of Germany in 1994, succeeding Richard von Weizsäcker.

==== Kohl's fifth term, 1994–1998 ====
Following the 1994 federal election, Helmut Kohl was reelected as Chancellor for his fifth and last term.

=== Chancellorship of Gerhard Schröder (1998–2005) ===
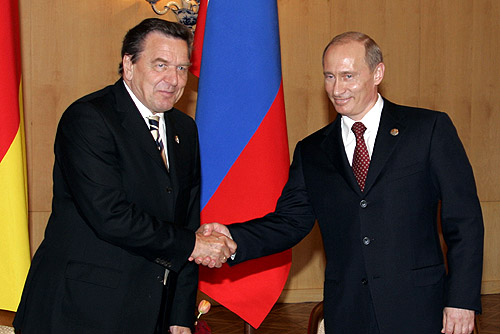
Schröder with Russian president Vladimir Putin in Moscow on 9 May 2005

==== First term, 1998–2002 ====
The ruling liberal-conservative coalition government, consisting of the CDU/CSU and the FDP, lost the 1998 federal election, and Gerhard Schröder was elected as Chancellor, at the head of a coalition government consisting of his own SPD party and The Greens. Joschka Fischer, a leading Green politician, became Vice Chancellor and Foreign Minister.

Shortly after the formation of the government, Minister of Finance Oskar Lafontaine, a former SPD chairman and rival of Schröder, resigned from the cabinet. He was succeeded as Minister of Finance by Hans Eichel.

In 1998, it became known that the CDU/CSU had received anonymous funding. Helmut Kohl subsequently resigned as honorary party chairman, and in 2000, Wolfgang Schäuble resigned as party chairman. Angela Merkel, the Secretary General of the CDU since 1998, emerged as a leading figure in the party and was elected chairwoman in 2000.

In 1999, Johannes Rau was elected President of Germany. Rau had tried to be elected president for several years.

A large tax reform was implemented in 2000. After 2003, the federal government enacted a number of reforms in social and health policy, known as Agenda 2010. The Schröder government also stressed environmental issues and promoted the reduction of greenhouse gas.

Germany took part in the NATO war against Yugoslavia in 1999, when German forces saw combat for the first time since World War II. Chancellor Schröder supported the war on terror following the September 11 attacks against the United States, and Germany sent forces to Afghanistan. Germany also sent forces to Kosovo and other parts of the world.

In 1999, Germany partially adopted the Euro, which completely replaced the Deutsche Mark as the currency of Germany in 2002.

Several German cities, notably Dresden and Magdeburg, experienced severe flooding during the 2002 European floods.

==== Second term, 2002–2005 ====
In 2002, Edmund Stoiber was the candidate for Chancellor for the CDU/CSU, the first time a CSU politician was chancellor candidate since the candidacy of Franz Josef Strauss in 1980. Both CDU/CSU and the SPD polled 38.5% in the 2002 federal election. Since the Greens became larger than the liberals, Gerhard Schröder's government was reelected.

Germany and France vehemently opposed the 2003 Iraq War, leading the administration of George W. Bush to label Germany and France as the Old Europe, as opposed to the countries (mainly former east bloc countries) that supported the war. However, Germany supported the United States militarily in other parts of the world, notably in the Horn of Africa and Kuwait.

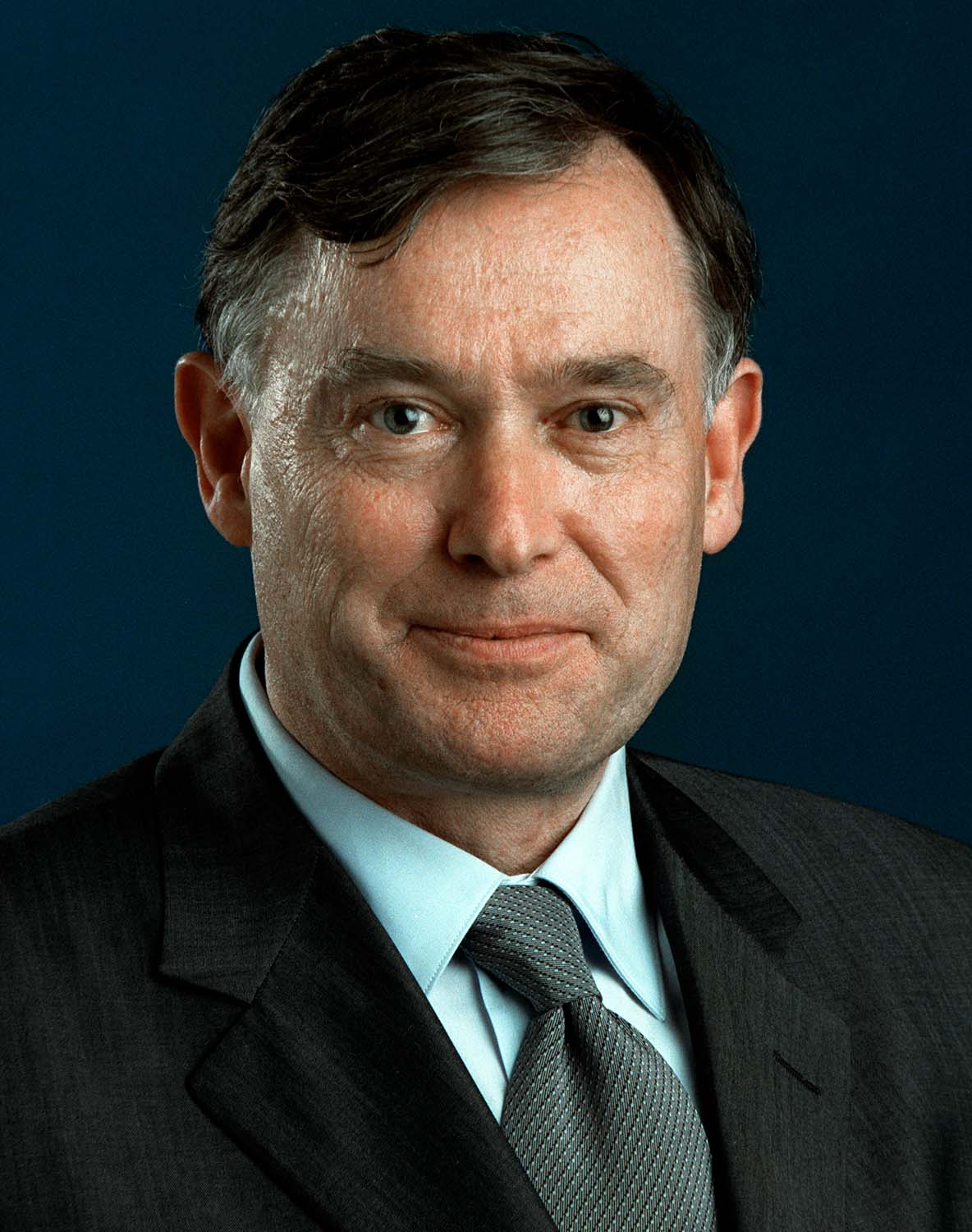
President Horst Köhler

The early 2000s saw increased unemployment and an aging population. The government instituted further reforms to meet these challenges, known as the Hartz reforms. However, as the Bundesrat of Germany had a CDU/CSU majority, the government of Gerhard Schröder was dependent on support from the conservatives in order to pass legislation.

On May 23, 2004, Horst Köhler, the former head of the International Monetary Fund and a CDU politician, was elected President of Germany. Köhler, who was previously relatively unknown in Germany, quickly became one of the country's most popular politicians.

After a bitter defeat for the SPD in state elections in the state of North Rhine-Westphalia (22 May 2005), Chancellor Schröder asked the German Bundestag (lower house of parliament) for a vote of no-confidence. Schröder argued that it had become increasingly difficult to push for the necessary socio-economic reforms because of the opposition majority in the upper house of the parliament, the Bundesrat, as well as the tensions within his own party. After losing this vote, as intended, on July 1, Chancellor Schröder was able to ask President Horst Köhler to call new federal elections. On 21 July 2005 the President agreed to Chancellor's request and dissolved the parliament, scheduling early parliamentary elections for 18 September.

=== Chancellorship of Angela Merkel (2005–2021) ===
==== First term, 2005–2009 ====
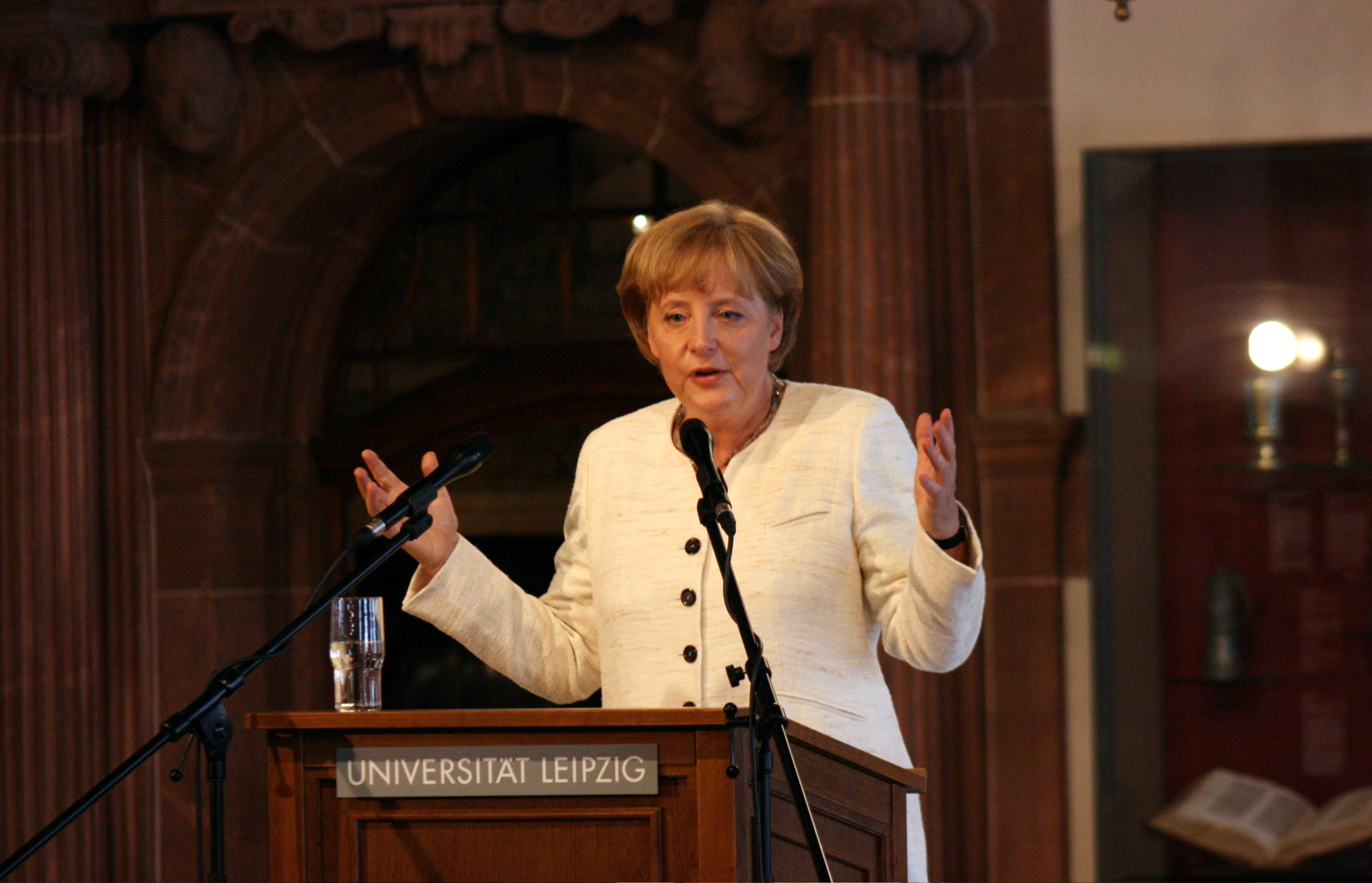
Angela Merkel, 2008

The 2005 federal election resulted in a stalemate for both major parties, SPD and CDU/CSU, as they won almost the same number of seats, but not enough to form a majority without the support of several smaller parties. This was resolved on November 11, 2005, when both parties agreed to form a grand coalition led by Angela Merkel who became the first female Chancellor of Germany.

Under Merkel, Germany hosted the 2007 G8 summit in Heiligendamm, Mecklenburg.

In January 2009 the German government approved a €50 billion economic stimulus plan to protect several sectors from a downturn and a subsequent rise in unemployment rates.

==== Second term, 2009–2013 ====
In the 2009 federal election, the CDU/CSU and the FDP won a majority and Angela Merkel could form a coalition with the liberals, the Cabinet Merkel II. Guido Westerwelle became the new Vice Chancellor. The Social Democrats did especially poorly in the election.

Among the major German political projects initiated in this term are the energy transition (Energiewende) [In fact, it was the previous government which initiated the exit from nuclear power. This policy was reversed by Merkel before she was forced into a U-turn by Fukushima.] for a sustainable energy supply, the "Debt Brake" (Schuldenbremse) for balanced budgets, the reform of German immigration laws, and high-tech strategies for the informatization and future transition of the German economy, summarized as Industry 4.0.

==== Third term, 2013–2018 ====
In December 2013, the grand coalition was re-established in a Third Merkel cabinet. The FDP Liberals are not present in the Bundestag for the first time. Since 2014, the newly established right-wing populist Alternative for Germany (AfD) party were elected for various Landtag mandates.

Major political projects of the second grand coalition under Merkel are the legislation for a general minimum wage in Germany and various welfare reforms, including pension reforms. Projects initiated with the Liberals in the second term are largely continued.

Germany was affected by the European migrant crisis in 2015 as it became the final destination of choice for many asylum seekers from Africa and the Middle East entering the EU. The country took in over a million refugees and migrants and developed a quota system which redistributed migrants around its federal states based on their tax income and existing population density. The decision by Merkel to authorize unrestricted entry led to heavy criticism in Germany as well as within Europe.

==== Fourth term, 2018–2021 ====
In 2017, Angela Merkel was elected to a fourth term as Chancellor. The FDP reentered the Bundestag, and for the first time the right-wing populist AfD also entered in the election. In March 2018, Angela Merkel formed another grand coalition with Social Democrats (SPD) after five months of political deadlock since September's election. Angela Merkel said on her fourth term that she would not seek another term in the next elections and that she would retire.

=== Chancellorship of Olaf Scholz (2021–2025) ===
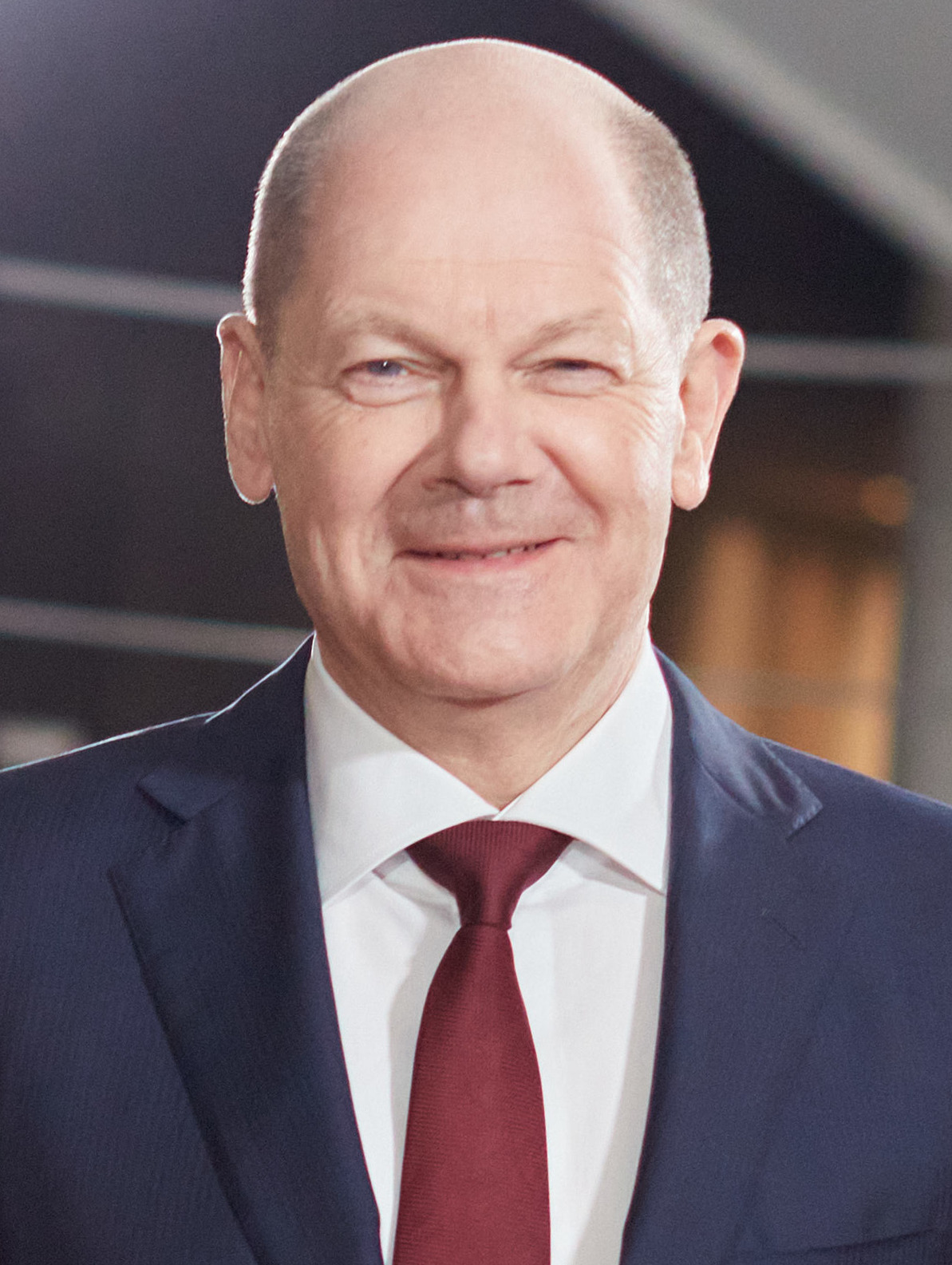
Olaf Scholz

On 8 December 2021, Social Democrat Olaf Scholz was sworn in as chancellor. He formed a traffic-light coalition government with the Greens and the FDP after the SPD won a plurality as a result of the 2021 federal election.

Frank-Walter Steinmeier was re-elected for a second five-year term as Germany's president, a first for an SPD president, attributed to his perception as a symbol of consensus and continuity.

Russia's invasion of Ukraine in 2022 and its economic effects dominated Scholz's early foreign and domestic policies. Germany's previous foreign policy towards Russia (traditional Ostpolitik) was criticized for having been too credulous and soft towards Russia. Scholz's Zeitenwende speech three days after the start of the invasion signaled a foreign policy shift in contemporary Germany, with billions of dollars in investments in the German military. Scholz also approved direct military and economic aid to Ukraine. Amid a global energy crisis, Scholz committed to weaken dependence on Russian energy imports by halting certification of Nord Stream 2 while also committing to Merkel's policy of phasing out nuclear energy. The country received over 1.2 million refugees from Ukraine.

As of December 2023, Germany is the fourth largest economy in the world after the United States, China and Japan and the largest economy in Europe. It is the third largest export nation in the world.

Scholz's premiership also attained attention when his government supported Israel during the Gaza war following the October 7 attacks by Hamas, which has attracted significant media attention and commentary.

=== Rise of the far right and the AfD ===
With the rise of National conservatism, right-wing populism, Völkisch Nationalism and the Neue Rechte during the 2020s, young conservatives became more likely to support far-right and hard-right parties such as the Alternative for Germany (AfD). The AfD particularly became successful among the region of East Germany within the states that were a part of the German Democratic Republic. During the 2025 German federal election the AfD won the majority of votes within the region.

On 5 June 2023, The Alternative for Germany (AfD) in Thuringia won its first district election in Sonneberg, despite all the other parties supporting the CDU Candidate.

On 17 December 2023, The AfD candidate for mayor of Pirna Saxony won in an election. it is the first mayor of a city with more than 20,000 inhabitants to be held by the AfD.

In the 2024 Thuringian state election, the AfD became the first far-right party in Germany since the Nazi Party to win a plurality of seats in a state election.

In February 2025, CDU/CSU, the conservatives, won Germany's 2025 federal election, becoming the biggest group in the parliament. However, far-right Alternative for Germany, AfD, doubled its support to become the second biggest political party in parliament with 20.8% of the vote. SPD, the Social Democrats, had its worst performance in decades with 16.4% of the vote.

On 2 May 2025, the AfD, which was at that time – since April 2025 – partially leading the federal-wide opinion polling for the first time in German history, was classified as a "proven right-wing extremist endeavor" by the Federal Office for the Protection of the Constitution. The classification was temporarily suspended by the Office a week after its announcement in May 2025. The expertise that led to the classification was later leaked to the public.

In October 2026, Tobias Rausch from the AfD was elected speaker of Saxony-Anhalt's state parliament. This was the AfD party's first time in such position and the first time a far-right party has held such a post in the country since 1945. AfD's Hans-Thomas Tillschneider was elected deputy speaker.

=== Chancellorship of Friedrich Merz (2025–present) ===
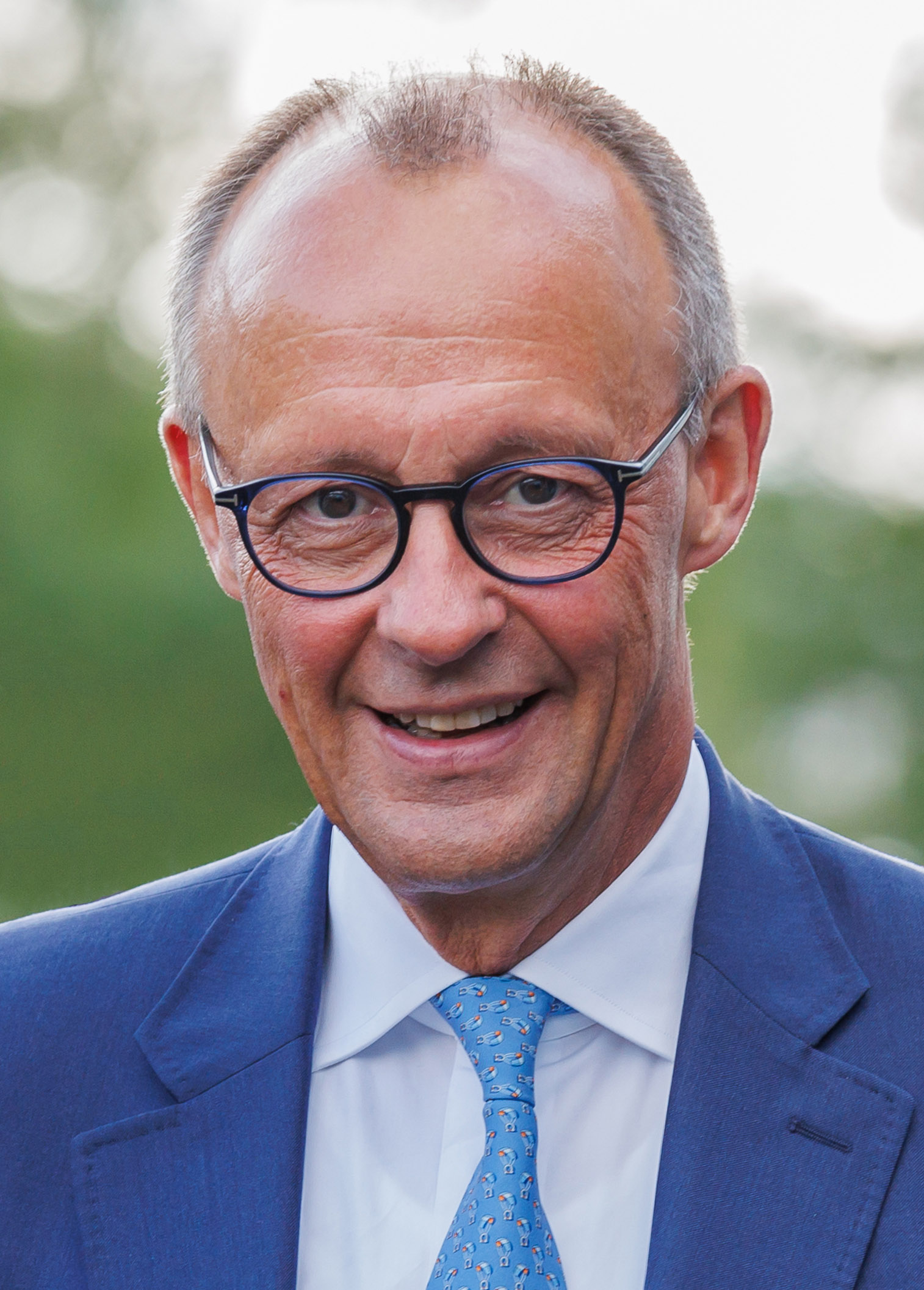
Friedrich Merz

On 6 May 2025, Friedrich Merz was sworn in as Germany's next chancellor by President Frank-Walter Steinmeier. Merz formed a coalition with his Christian Democrats, its sister party the Christian Social Union and the Social Democrats.
