= Hecht (surname) =

Hecht is a surname of German and Yiddish (העכט, hekht) origin. In both languages, the word means "pike".

Notable people with the surname include:

== Politics and law ==
- Burton Hecht (born 1927), New York politician and judge
- Chic Hecht, former U.S. Senator from Nevada and U.S. Ambassador to the Bahamas
- Christian Hecht (born 1971), German politician
- Daryl Hecht (1952–2019), American judge
- Evelyn Hecht-Galinski (born 1949), Jewish-German activist
- Greg Hecht, American politician
- Inge Hecht (1947–2019), German politician
- Jon Hecht (born 1958), Massachusetts legislator, attorney and China law expert
- Michael Hecht, birth name of Michael Howard, British politician and leader of the Conservative Party from 2003 until 2005
- Nathan Hecht, American judge
- Sue Hecht, American politician

== Academics ==
- Daniel Friedrich Hecht (1777–1833), German mathematician
- Eugene Hecht (born 1938), American physicist
- Friedrich Hecht (1903–1980), Austrian chemist and writer
- Frederick Hecht, American pediatrician, medical geneticist and teacher (descendant of Sam Hecht, Jr, co-founder of Hecht's)
- Michael Hecht (communication scientist), researcher in human communication
- Selig Hecht, American physiologist and atomic energy expositor
- Stefan Hecht, German chemist, professor at Humboldt University of Berlin
- Tobias Hecht, American anthropologist, ethnographer, and translator (descendant of Sam Hecht, Jr, co-founder of Hecht's)
- Robert Hecht-Nielsen, artificial intelligence and cognition theorist

== Literature ==
- Anthony Hecht (1923–2004), American poet
- Daniel Hecht, American novelist
- Jennifer Michael Hecht (born 1965), American poet, historian, philosopher, and author

== Entertainment ==
- Albie Hecht, former president of Spike TV and Nickelodeon
- Ben Hecht, prolific Hollywood screenwriter
- Erik Hecht, real name of German musician Eric Fish
- Gina Hecht (born 1953), American actress
- Harold Hecht, film producer
- Jessica Hecht, American actress
- Larry Hecht (1918-2008), better known as Larry Haines, American actor
- Paul Hecht, Canadian actor

== Sports ==
- Duvall Hecht, American Olympic champion row
- Gerhard Hecht (1923-2005), German boxer
- Jeff Hecht, Canadian football player
- Jochen Hecht, German ice hockey player
- Ladislav Hecht (1909–2004), Czech-American professional tennis player
- Michael Hecht, German soccer player
- Raymond Hecht, German javelin-thrower
- Sam Hecht (born 2003), American football player

== Business ==
- Ernest Hecht (1929–2018), British publisher
- Lotte Irene Hecht (1919-1983), German-Canadian entrepreneur, founder of "The 1945 Foundation", a Canadian charity organization
- Robert E. Hecht (1919–2012), American antiquities dealer
- Reuben Hecht (1909–1993), Israeli industrialist.
- Sam Hecht (born 1969), British industrial designer
- Sam Hecht, Jr., American retailer, co-founder of Hecht's

== Other ==
- Abraham Hecht (1922–2013), American Orthodox rabbi, Rabbi Emeritus of Cong. Shaarei Zion (largest Syrian community besides Israel).
- Anton Hecht, English artist and filmmaker
- Erwin Hecht, O.M.I. (1933–2016), German Roman Catholic bishop
- Estelle Hecht, Canadian artist and gallery owner
- Hans-Joachim Hecht, German chess grandmaster
- Jacob J. Hecht (1924–1990), American rabbi
- John Rudolf Hecht (1911-1988), Austrian-Canadian entrepreneur and Austrian Honorary Consul in Kanada, founder of "The 1945 Foundation", a Canadian charity organization
- Joan Hecht, American writer and activist
- Józef Hecht (1891–1951), also known as Joseph Hecht, Polish printmaker and painter
- Kenneth Hecht, American public interest attorney, health and nutrition advocate (descendant of Sam Hecht, Jr., co-founder of Hecht's)
- Kenneth Hecht (disambiguation)
- Lina Frank Hecht (1848–1920), Boston philanthropist
- Mary Hecht (1931–2013), American-born Canadian sculptor
- Nathan Hecht (born 1949), Texas Supreme Court Justice
- Sigmund Hecht (1849–1925), Hungarian-born Reform rabbi in Montgomery, Alabama; Milwaukee, Wisconsin; Los Angeles, California.

== Hechtman ==
- Gideon Gechtman (1942, Cairo - 2008), an Israeli artist, sculptor
- J. F. Hechtman (1854–1933), American politician
- Ken Hechtman (born 1967), a Jewish Canadian freelance journalist

== See also ==
- Lotte and John Hecht Memorial Foundation, a Canadian charitable foundation in Vancouver, founded 1962 as "The 1945 Foundation"
- Hecht Synagogue, Hebrew University, Jerusalem, Israel
- Reuben and Edith Hecht Museum, Haifa, Israel
- 10484 Hecht, an asteroid
