= Moldenhauer =

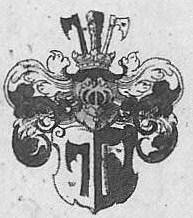
Wappen Moldenhauer

Moldenhauer is a German surname. Notable people with the surname include:

- Ernst Moldenhauer, German fencer
- Hans Moldenhauer (1901–1929), German tennis player
- Hans Moldenhauer (1906–1987), German-American collector, musician and philanthropist. Founder of the Moldenhauer Archives of the Library of Congress
- Chad and Jared Moldenhauer (born 1979 (Chad) and 1980 (Jared)), founders of Studio MDHR, the development studio notable for the indie video game Cuphead
- Hans-Georg Moldenhauer (born 1941), German footballer
- Henry R. Moldenhauer (1855-1925), American politician and businessman
- Jan Moldenhauer (born 1980), German politician
- Joanne Moldenhauer (1928–2016), American high school mathematics teacher
- Paul Moldenhauer (1876–1947), German Finance Minister, economist and politician
- Siegfried Moldenhauer (1915–1998), German military officer
