= Matthias Lieschke =

German politician (born 1970)

Member of the Landtag of Saxony-Anhalt
- Incumbent
- Assumed office 12 April 2016

Personal details
- Born: 30 September 1970 (age 56) Wittenberg
- Party: Alternative for Germany (since 2014)

Matthias Lieschke (born 30 September 1970 in Wittenberg) is a German politician serving as a member of the Landtag of Saxony-Anhalt since 2016. He has been a city councillor of Kemberg and a district councillor of Wittenberg since 2014.

Lieschke was accused of conduct that severely damaged both the party and the parliamentary group in January 2026. It is alleged that he secretly recorded a meeting of district-level leadership—held via video conference in early December 2025 and forwarded the audio file to the AfD politician Jan Wenzel Schmidt. Schmidt exposed how the party—specifically the AfD in Saxony-Anhalt—had become riddled with cronyism and the preferential treatment of relatives, all at the public's expense.

Since Lieschke despite the dispute was considered one of the few politicians with expertise in economic policy, the party leadership sought to resolve the conflict. On August 7, 2026, the AfD state branch officially announced that the proceedings to expel him from the party had been dropped. According to AfD Saxony Anhalt, an agreement had been reached with Lieschke. In the 2026 Saxony-Anhalt state election, he was re-elected and now holds a seat in the state parliament representing the AfD.
