= Anhalt – Dessau – Wittenberg =

Federal electoral district of Germany

70 Anhalt – Dessau – Wittenberg
- Electoral district for the Bundestag
- Anhalt – Dessau – Wittenberg in 2025
- State: Saxony-Anhalt
- Population: 205,100 (2019)
- Electorate: 169,749 (2021)
- Major settlements: Dessau-Roßlau; Wittenberg; Bitterfeld-Wolfen
- Area: 2,967.41 km^{2}

Current electoral district
- Created: 2009
- Party: AfD
- Member: Volker Scheurell
- Elected: 2025

Anhalt – Dessau – Wittenberg is an electoral constituency (German: Wahlkreis) represented in the Bundestag. It elects one member via first-past-the-post voting. Under the current constituency numbering system, it is designated as constituency 70. It is located in eastern Saxony-Anhalt, comprising the city of Dessau-Roßlau, the district of Wittenberg, and part of the district of Anhalt-Bitterfeld.

Anhalt – Dessau – Wittenberg was created for the 2009 federal election. From 2017 to 2025, it was represented by Sepp Müller of the Christian Democratic Union (CDU). Since 2025 it has been represented by Volker Scheurell.

== Geography ==
Dessau – Wittenberg is located in eastern Saxony-Anhalt. As of the 2025 federal election, it comprises the independent city of Dessau-Roßlau, the district of Wittenberg, and the municipalities of Bitterfeld-Wolfen, Muldestausee, Raguhn-Jeßnitz, and Zerbst from the Anhalt-Bitterfeld district.

== History ==
Anhalt – Dessau – Wittenberg, originally just Dessau – Wittenberg was created in 2009 and contained parts of the abolished constituencies of Elbe-Havel-Gebiet and Anhalt. In the 2009 election, it was constituency 71 in the numbering system. Since the 2013 election, it has been number 70. Until 2025, it comprised only the city of Dessau-Roßlau and the district of Wittenberg.

Election	No.	Name	Borders
2009	71	Dessau – Wittenberg	Dessau-Roßlau city; Wittenberg district
2013	70	Dessau – Wittenberg	Dessau-Roßlau city; Wittenberg district
2017	70	Dessau – Wittenberg	Dessau-Roßlau city; Wittenberg district
2021	70	Dessau – Wittenberg	Dessau-Roßlau city; Wittenberg district
2025	70	Anhalt – Dessau – Wittenberg	Dessau-Roßlau city; Wittenberg district; Anhalt-Bitterfeld district (only Bitterfeld-Wolfen, Muldestausee, Raguhn-Jeßnitz, and Zerbst municipalities)

== Members ==
The constituency was first represented by Ulrich Petzold of the Christian Democratic Union (CDU) from 2009 to 2017. Sepp Müller of the CDU was elected in 2017, and re-elected in 2021.

Election	Member	Party	%
2009	Ulrich Petzold	CDU	36.0
2013	Ulrich Petzold	CDU	44.6
2017	Sepp Müller	CDU	35.2
2021	Sepp Müller	CDU	34.3
2025	Volker Scheurell	AfD	38.6

== Election results ==
=== 2025 election ===
Federal election (2025): Anhalt – Dessau – Wittenberg
Notes:	Blue background denotes the winner of the electorate vote. Pink background denotes a candidate elected from their party list. Yellow background denotes an electorate win by a list member, or other incumbent. A ✓ or ✗ denotes status of any incumbent, win or lose respectively.						
Party	Candidate	Votes	%	±%	Party votes	%	±%
AfD	Volker Scheurell	67,245	38.6	▲17.7	65,554	37.5	▲17.5
CDU	✗ Sepp Müller	51,473	29.5	▼1.3	37,579	21.5	▼1.2
BSW					18,950	10.8	New
SPD	Diana Bäse	18,253	10.5	▼9.9	18,381	10.5	▼15.4
Left	Doreen Hainich	17,744	10.2	▲0.9	16,654	9.5	▲0.8
Greens	Steffi Lemke	8,426	4.8	▼1.0	6,829	3.9	▼1.5
FW	Maik Mattheis	7,458	4.3	▲1.0	3,270	1.9	▼0.4
FDP	Henning Fliß	3,715	2.1	▼4.8	5,112	2.9	▼6.2
PARTEI					1,296	0.7	0.0
Volt					861	0.5	▲0.4
BD					406	0.2	New
MLPD					128	0.1	0.0
Informal votes		2,020			1,314		
Total valid votes		174,314			175,020		
Turnout		176,334	77.4	▲10.3			
AfD gain from CDU	Majority	15,781	9.1	N/A			

=== 2021 election ===
Federal election (2021): Dessau – Wittenberg
Notes:	Blue background denotes the winner of the electorate vote. Pink background denotes a candidate elected from their party list. Yellow background denotes an electorate win by a list member, or other incumbent. A ✓ or ✗ denotes status of any incumbent, win or lose respectively.						
Party	Candidate	Votes	%	±%	Party votes	%	±%
CDU	✓ Sepp Müller	39,042	34.3	▼0.9	26,740	23.5	▼8.4
SPD	Leonard Schneider	22,178	19.5	▲7.3	29,843	26.2	▲11.9
AfD	Andreas Mrosek	22,002	19.3	0.0	21,630	19.0	▼1.0
Left	Johannes Hüthel	9,003	7.9	▼10.3	9,635	8.5	▼8.9
Greens	Steffi Lemke	7,632	6.7	▲2.1	6,531	5.7	▲2.2
FDP	Alexander Martin Oppelt	7,591	6.7	▲1.7	10,402	9.1	▲1.8
FW	Steven Slavicek	3,530	3.1	0.0	2,543	2.2	▲0.6
dieBasis	Ernst Wolff	2,074	1.8		1,654	1.5	
Tierschutzpartei					1,275	1.1	
Tierschutzallianz					1,001	0.9	▼0.4
PARTEI					876	0.8	▼0.1
Gartenpartei					587	0.5	▲0.2
Pirates					423	0.4	
Independent	Günther Wassenaar	415	0.4				
Independent	Mario Rohne	352	0.3				
NPD					340	0.3	▼0.7
Volt					149	0.1	
Humanists					102	0.1	
du.					100	0.1	
MLPD					85	0.1	0.0
ÖDP					53	0.0	
Informal votes		1,385			1,235		
Total valid votes		113,819			113,969		
Turnout		115,204	67.9	▼1.9			
CDU hold	Majority	16,864	14.8	▼1.0			

=== 2017 election ===
Federal election (2017): Dessau – Wittenberg
Notes:	Blue background denotes the winner of the electorate vote. Pink background denotes a candidate elected from their party list. Yellow background denotes an electorate win by a list member, or other incumbent. A ✓ or ✗ denotes status of any incumbent, win or lose respectively.						
Party	Candidate	Votes	%	±%	Party votes	%	±%
CDU	Sepp Müller	42,781	35.2	▼9.3	38,751	31.8	▼10.7
AfD	Andreas Mrosek	23,520	19.4	▲14.7	24,327	20.0	▲14.9
Left	Jörg Schindler	22,086	18.2	▼3.7	21,102	17.3	▼5.5
SPD	Stefan Maria Stader	14,806	12.2	▼5.1	17,360	14.3	▼2.8
FDP	Jörg Schnurre	6,051	5.0	▲3.7	8,940	7.3	▲4.9
Greens	Steffi Lemke	5,607	4.6	▲0.3	4,299	3.5	▼0.4
FW	Angela Schwarz	3,717	3.1	▲1.2	2,006	1.6	▲0.2
Independent	Tobias Dieter Ulbrich	1,666	1.4				
Tierschutzallianz					1,572	1.3	
NPD	Danilo Wessel	1,165	1.0	▼1.4	1,205	1.0	▼1.4
PARTEI					1,094	0.9	
MG					429	0.4	
BGE					364	0.3	
DiB					168	0.1	
MLPD					127	0.1	0.0
Informal votes		2,067			1,722		
Total valid votes		121,399			121,744		
Turnout		123,466	69.8	▲4.8			
CDU hold	Majority	19,261	15.8	▼6.9			

=== 2013 election ===
Federal election (2013): Dessau – Wittenberg
Notes:	Blue background denotes the winner of the electorate vote. Pink background denotes a candidate elected from their party list. Yellow background denotes an electorate win by a list member, or other incumbent. A ✓ or ✗ denotes status of any incumbent, win or lose respectively.						
Party	Candidate	Votes	%	±%	Party votes	%	±%
CDU	✓ Ulrich Petzold	53,048	44.6	▲8.6	50,633	42.5	▲10.9
Left	Jörg Schindler	26,015	21.9	▼8.7	27,136	22.8	▼8.4
SPD	Arne Lietz	20,545	17.3	▼1.1	20,354	17.1	▲0.8
AfD	Arndt Klapproth	5,575	4.7		6,050	5.1	
Greens	Steffi Lemke	5,196	4.4	▲0.2	4,703	4.0	▼1.1
NPD	Thomas Lindemann	2,814	2.4	▼0.1	2,799	2.4	▲0.2
FW	Michael Marks	2,234	1.9		1,728	1.5	
Pirates	Sandra Tiedtke	2,053	1.7		2,160	1.8	▼0.7
FDP	Norbert Hentschke	1,489	1.3	▼6.1	2,892	2.4	▼8.0
PRO					327	0.3	
ÖDP					145	0.1	
MLPD					120	0.1	▼0.2
Informal votes		1,836			1,758		
Total valid votes		118,969			119,047		
Turnout		120,805	65.0	▲2.7			
CDU hold	Majority	27,033	22.7	▲17.2			

=== 2009 election ===
Federal election (2009): Dessau – Wittenberg
Notes:	Blue background denotes the winner of the electorate vote. Pink background denotes a candidate elected from their party list. Yellow background denotes an electorate win by a list member, or other incumbent. A ✓ or ✗ denotes status of any incumbent, win or lose respectively.						
Party	Candidate	Votes	%	±%	Party votes	%	±%
CDU	Ulrich Petzold	43,424	36.0	▲5.2	38,247	31.7	▲6.0
Left	Jörg Schindler	36,809	30.5	▲7.1	37,709	31.2	▲6.0
SPD	Engelbert Wistuba	22,187	18.4	▼15.5	19,739	16.3	▼15.5
FDP	Manfred Bähr	8,810	7.3	▲2.7	12,614	10.4	▲1.7
Greens	Stefan Krabbes	5,004	4.1	▲1.3	6,131	5.1	▲0.7
Pirates					3,000	2.5	
NPD	Thomas Lindemann	2,928	2.4	0.0	2,627	2.2	▼0.1
Independent	Peter Fitzek	878	0.7				
DVU					428	0.4	
MLPD	Klaus Fuchs	544	0.5	0.0	317	0.3	▼0.2
Informal votes		2,348			2,120		
Total valid votes		120,584			120,812		
Turnout		122,932	62.3	▼10.5			
CDU win new seat	Majority	6,615	5.5				
