= City of Masks =

City of Masks may refer to:

- City of Masks, a 2002 mystery novel by Daniel Hecht
- City of Masks, a fantasy novel by Mary Hoffman
- The City of Masks, a lost 1920 silent film
- City of Masks is a nickname given to the city of Venice, famous for their Venetian masks.
