= Nadine Koppehel =

German politician

Nadine Koppehel (born 1977 in Wolfen) is a German politician of the Alternative for Germany (AfD) party. She has been a member of the state parliament of Saxony-Anhalt since 2021. Koppehel is member of the right-wing extremist AfD state association Saxony-Anhalt.

Koppehel is an office clerk. She was office manager and financial accountant in the offices of AfD member of parliament Andreas Mrosek in Berlin, Dessau-Roßlau and Gräfenhainichen. According to herself, she became a member of AfD in 2015. She was elected to the city council of Oranienbaum-Wörlitz and then of Wittenberg in 2019. At the 2021 Saxony-Anhalt election Koppehel got elected to the Landtag. She is one of two womean in the AfD fraction, consisting of 23 MoP.

She is single and has one child.
