= Matthias Büttner =

German politician (born 1990)

Member of the Bundestag
- Incumbent
- Assumed office 24 October 2017

Personal details
- Born: 4 November 1990 (age 35) Stendal
- Party: AfD

Matthias Büttner (born 4 November 1990 in Stendal) is a German politician of the far-right party Alternative for Germany (AfD), having joined in 2014. Since 2017, Büttner is a member of the Bundestag, the German federal legislative body. Büttner is member of the right-wing extremist AfD state association Saxony-Anhalt.

Büttner was born 1990 in Stendal, Saxony-Anhalt and after his abitur became IT specialist.
