= Volker Scheurell =

German politician (born 1967)

Member of the Bundestag
- Assuming office TBD
- Succeeding: Sepp Müller
- Constituency: Anhalt – Dessau – Wittenberg

Personal details
- Born: 1967 (age 58–59)
- Party: Alternative for Germany
- Relatives: Frank Scheurell (brother)

Volker Scheurell (born 1967) is a German politician who was elected as a member of the Bundestag in 2025. He is the leader of the Alternative for Germany in the city council of Wittenberg.
