= Justice Hecht =

Justice Hecht may refer to:

- Daryl Hecht (1952–2019), associate justice of the Iowa Supreme Court
- Nathan Hecht (born 1949), chief justice of the Texas Supreme Court

== See also ==
- Hecht (disambiguation)
