= Daniel Wald =

German politician (born 1982)

Member of the Landtag of Saxony-Anhalt
- Incumbent
- Assumed office 16 April 2018
- Preceded by: Andreas Mrosek

Personal details
- Born: 25 February 1982 (age 44) Merseburg
- Party: Alternative for Germany (since 2015)

Daniel Wald (born 25 February 1982 in Merseburg) is a German politician serving as a member of the Landtag of Saxony-Anhalt since 2018. He has served as chairman of the Alternative for Germany in Merseburg since 2017.
