= Gunnar Schellenberger =

German politician

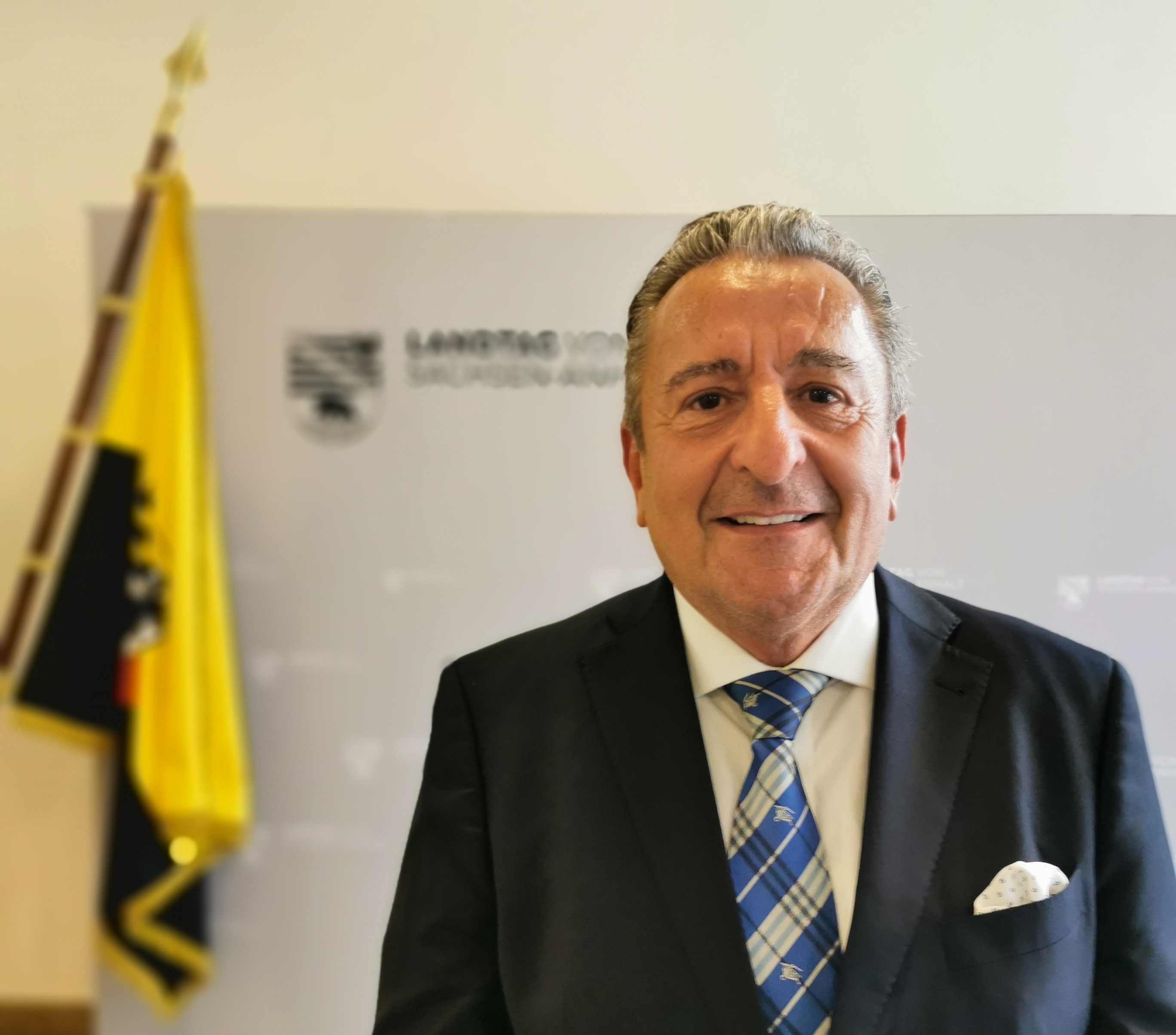

President of the Landtag of Saxony-Anhalt
- In office 6 July 2021 – 6 October 2026
- Preceded by: Gabriele Brakebusch
- Succeeded by: Tobias Rausch

Member of the Landtag of Saxony-Anhalt
- Incumbent
- Assumed office 6 July 2021
- Constituency: Schönebeck
- In office 2002–2016

Personal details
- Born: 12 January 1960 (age 66) Karl-Marx-Stadt, Bezirk Karl-Marx-Stadt, East Germany

Gunnar Schellenberger (born 12 January 1960) is a German politician for the CDU who served as president of the Landtag of Saxony-Anhalt from 2021 to 2026.

== Life and politics ==
Schellenberger was born in 1960 in the East German city of Karl-Marx-Stadt and became a teacher for mathematics and physics. Schellenberger entered the Christian democratic CDU in 1993 and became president of the state diet of Saxony-Anhalt in 2021.
