= Martin Reichardt =

German politician (born 1969)

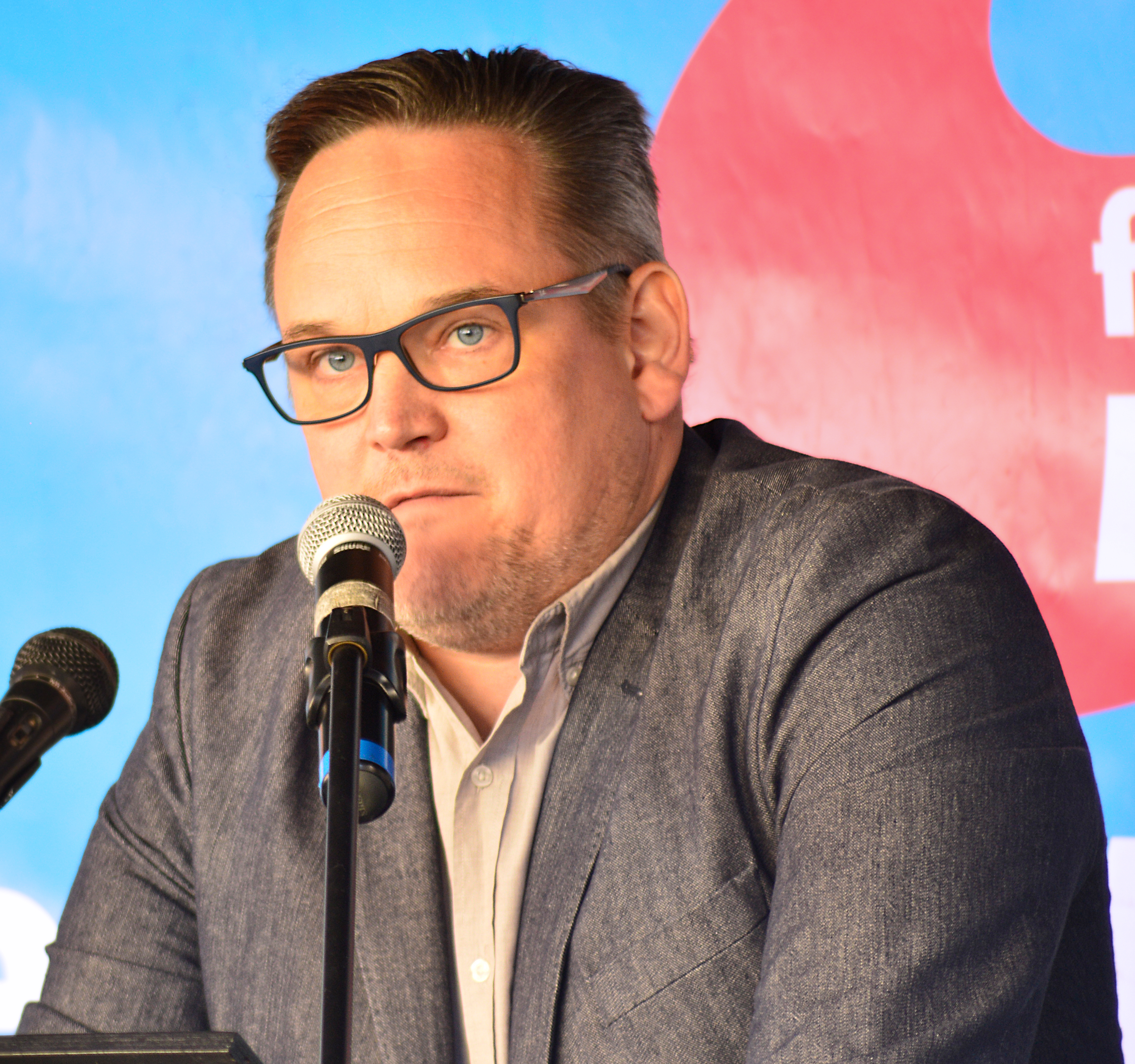
- Reichardt in 2018

Member of the Bundestag
- Incumbent
- Assumed office 2017

Personal details
- Born: 30 July 1969 (age 57) Goslar, West Germany
- Party: AfD

Martin Reichardt (born 30 July 1969) is a German politician. Born in Goslar, Lower Saxony, he represents Alternative for Germany (AfD). Reichardt has served as a member of the Bundestag from the state of Saxony-Anhalt since 2017. He is the chairman of AfD Saxony-Anhalt.

== Life ==
He became a member of the Bundestag after the 2017 German federal election. He is a member of the Committee for Family, Senior Citizens, Women and Youth and the Committee for Education, Research and Technology Assessment.
