= Florian Schröder =

German politician (born 1975)

Member of the Landtag of Saxony-Anhalt
- Incumbent
- Assumed office 6 June 2021

Personal details
- Born: 1975 (age 50–51)
- Party: Alternative for Germany (since 2015)

Florian Schröder (born 1975) is a German politician serving as a member of the Landtag of Saxony-Anhalt since 2021. He has been a city councillor of Petersberg since 2016, and a district councillor of the Saalekreis since 2019.
