= Mary Hecht =

Canadian sculptor

Mary Hecht (June 23, 1931 – April 2013) was an American-born Canadian sculptor.

Born in New York City, Hecht received her bachelor's degree from the University of Cincinnati in 1952 before doing graduate work at the University of Iowa, where she received her degree in 1957. She also had lessons at the Art Academy of Cincinnati, from 1948 to 1952; the Art Students League of New York, from 1949 to 1952; Columbia University, in 1950 and from 1952 to 1953; and the Camberwell School of Art, from 1958 to 1960. After moving to Canada, she taught for many years at McLaughlin College of York University. Hecht was very active in the Jewish community, as well as interfaith conferences about religion and art.

During her career she received several grants from the Ontario Arts Council. She took honorable mention at the International Exhibition of Liturgical Art and Architecture in Boston in 1976, and received the Excalibur bronze award at the Catherine Lorillard Wolfe Exhibition in 1983. In 1978, she was elected to the American Society of Contemporary Artists, and in 1982 to the Sculptors' Society of Canada. She taught and worked as a magazine illustrator, and exhibited widely in the United States, Canada and abroad. The Kitchener-Waterloo Art Gallery is among the public art galleries holding examples of her work.

Hecht was diagnosed with vascular dementia in later years, and began using a wheelchair after a series of strokes near the end of her life. Although she was unable to perform many simple tasks, she retained her artistic ability. She was the subject of a paper published after her death, discussing the possibility that art could be used to help stave off the effects of Alzheimer's disease. Hecht died in April 2013 at the age of 81.
