= Sepp Müller =

German politician (born 1989)

Member of the Bundestag
- Incumbent
- Assumed office 2017

Personal details
- Born: 22 January 1989 (age 37) Wittenberg, East Germany (now Germany)
- Party: CDU

Sepp Müller (born 22 January 1989) is a German politician of the Christian Democratic Union (CDU) who has been serving as a member of the Bundestag from the state of Saxony-Anhalt since 2017.

== Political career ==
Müller first became a member of the Bundestag in the 2017 German federal election, representing the Dessau – Wittenberg district. From 2018 to 2021, he was a member of the Finance Committee.

Since the 2021 elections, Müller has been serving as one of his parliamentary group's deputy chairs, under the leadership of successive chairs Ralph Brinkhaus (2021–2022), Friedrich Merz (2022–2025) and Jens Spahn (2025–present). In this capacity, he oversees the group’s legislative activities on health policy, sports and petitions. He was appointed to the role after he won an internal vote against Christian Hirte. Within the CDU/CSU parliamentary group, he has also been leading the group of CDU parliamentarians from Saxony-Anhalt since 2021.

== Political positions ==
Ahead of the Christian Democrats’ leadership election in December 2021, Müller publicly endorsed Norbert Röttgen to succeed Armin Laschet as the party’s chair.

== Personal life ==
Amid the COVID-19 pandemic in Germany, Müller volunteered at his local health department to help with contact tracing.

Müller has been in a relationship with fellow politician Wolfgang Stefinger since 2022. In July 2026 Müller married in Bavaria his husband Stefinger. They got a blessing ceremony in Archdiocese of Munich and Freising of Roman-Catholic church in Wildbad Kreuth.
