= Jan Scharfenort =

German politician (born 1972)

Member of the Landtag of Saxony-Anhalt
- Incumbent
- Assumed office 6 June 2021

Personal details
- Born: 1972 (age 53–54)
- Party: Alternative for Germany (since 2017)

Jan Scharfenort (born 1972) is a German politician serving as a member of the Landtag of Saxony-Anhalt since 2021. He has been a city councillor of Burg bei Magdeburg and a district councillor of Jerichower Land since 2019.
