= Matthias Büttner (politician, born 1983) =

German politician (born 1983)

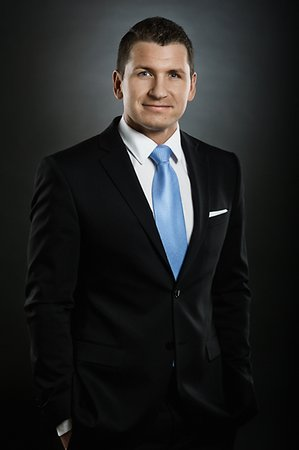
- Büttner in 2016

Member of the Landtag of Saxony-Anhalt
- Incumbent
- Assumed office 12 April 2016
- Preceded by: Peter Rotter
- Constituency: Staßfurt (2016–2021)

Personal details
- Born: 12 April 1983 (age 43)
- Party: Alternative for Germany (since 2014)

Matthias Büttner (born 12 April 1983) is a German politician serving as a member of the Landtag of Saxony-Anhalt since 2016. He has served as chairman of the Alternative for Germany in the Salzlandkreis since 2016.
