= Christian Hecht =

German politician (born 1971)

Member of the Landtag of Saxony-Anhalt
- Incumbent
- Assumed office 6 June 2021

Personal details
- Born: 19 February 1971 (age 55) Halberstadt
- Party: Alternative for Germany (since 2016)

Christian Hecht (born 19 February 1971) is a German politician serving as a member of the Landtag of Saxony-Anhalt since 2021. From 2017 to 2018, he served as president of the arbitral tribunal of the AfD Saxony-Anhalt.
