= Jan Wenzel Schmidt =

German politician (born 1991)

Member of the Bundestag
- Incumbent
- Assumed office 2021

Personal details
- Born: 8 October 1991 (age 35) Magdeburg, Germany
- Party: Alternative for Germany

Jan Wenzel Schmidt (born 8 October 1991) is a German politician for the AfD and since 2021 member of the Bundestag, the federal diet. Schmidt is member of the Saxony-Anhalt branch of his party.

== Life and politics ==
Prior to his political career in the German Bundestag, Jan Wenzel Schmidt operated lottery retail outlets. Schmidt joined the AfD in 2014. After being elected to the State Parliament of Saxony-Anhalt, he applied unsuccessfully on several occasions for the position of district manager for the lottery. Drawing on his specialized knowledge, he uncovered internal irregularities and "shady dealings" within the state-owned lottery company. His revelations ultimately led to the replacement of the management team at the Saxony-Anhalt lottery company in 2019.

One year later, he co-founded their youth organization Junge Alternative (Young Alternative for Germany) and became their first chairman. In 2016 Schmidt was elected to the Landtag of Saxony-Anhalt. He became member of the Bundestag in 2021. He was re-elected in the 2025 German federal election, winning his constituency with 43.2% of the vote.

Shortly before Christmas 2025, the state executive committee of the AfD Saxony-Anhalt requested that Schmidt be expelled from the AfD and to revoke his membership rights. The latter has now been confirmed by the state arbitration court of the AfD. While the AfD's expulsion proceedings against him are ongoing, Schmidt remains a member of the AfD but has no membership rights.

Schmidt was secretary general of the AfD Saxony-Anhalt from 2022 until his departure from the position in 2025 due to various allegations against him. The state executive committee has accused him of employing staff from his own private e-cigarette company as mini-jobbers in his Bundestag office, at the taxpayers' expense.

In the course of this dispute, Wenzel brought to light a political scandal involving widespread cronyism at all levels of the AfD. In the weeks that followed, it became clear that a majority of AfD politician from the AfD in Saxony-Anhalt who was in a position to fill roles funded by public money had hired their own friends, relatives, or the family members of their colleagues.

In January 2026, an AfD party tribunal confirmed that Wenzel would lose his membership rights. It accused him of fictitious employment and lobbying.
