= Hagen Kohl =

German politician (born 1969)

Member of the Landtag of Saxony-Anhalt
- Incumbent
- Assumed office 12 April 2016

Personal details
- Born: 24 April 1969 (age 56) Magdeburg
- Party: Alternative for Germany (since 2013)

Hagen Kohl (born 24 April 1969 in Magdeburg) is a German politician serving as a member of the Landtag of Saxony-Anhalt since 2016. He has been a city councillor of Magdeburg since 2019.
