= Dieter Stier =

German politician

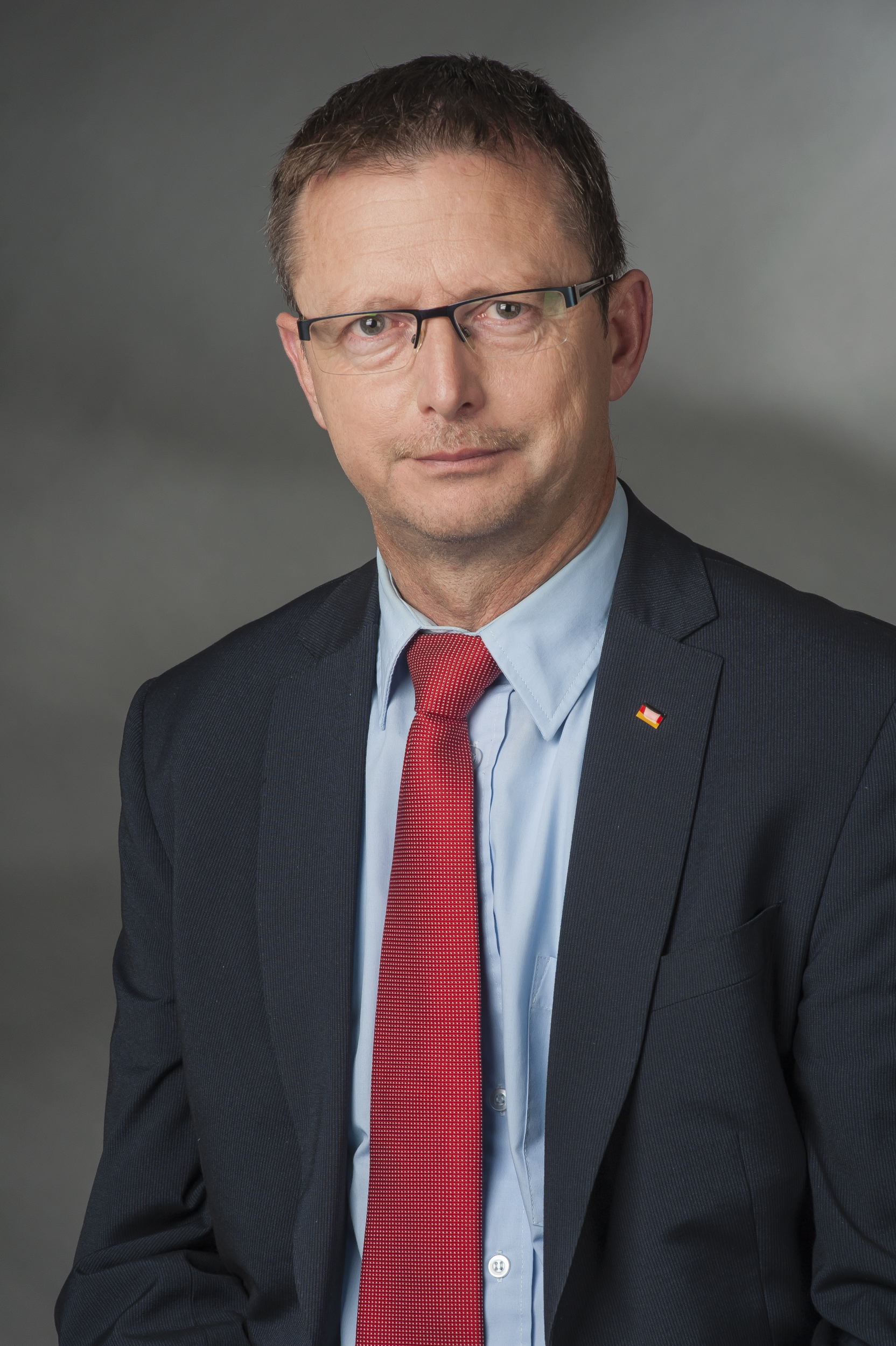
- Dieter Stier in 2014

Member of the Bundestag
- Incumbent
- Assumed office 2009

Personal details
- Born: 29 June 1964 (age 61) Weißenfels, West Germany (now Germany)
- Party: CDU

Dieter Stier (born 29 June 1964) is a German politician. Born in Weißenfels, Saxony-Anhalt, he represents the CDU. Dieter Stier has served as a member of the Bundestag from the state of Saxony-Anhalt since 2009.

== Life ==
He became member of the bundestag after the 2009 German federal election. He is a member of the Committee for Food and Agriculture and the Sports Committee.
