= Birke Bull-Bischoff =

German politician (born 1963)

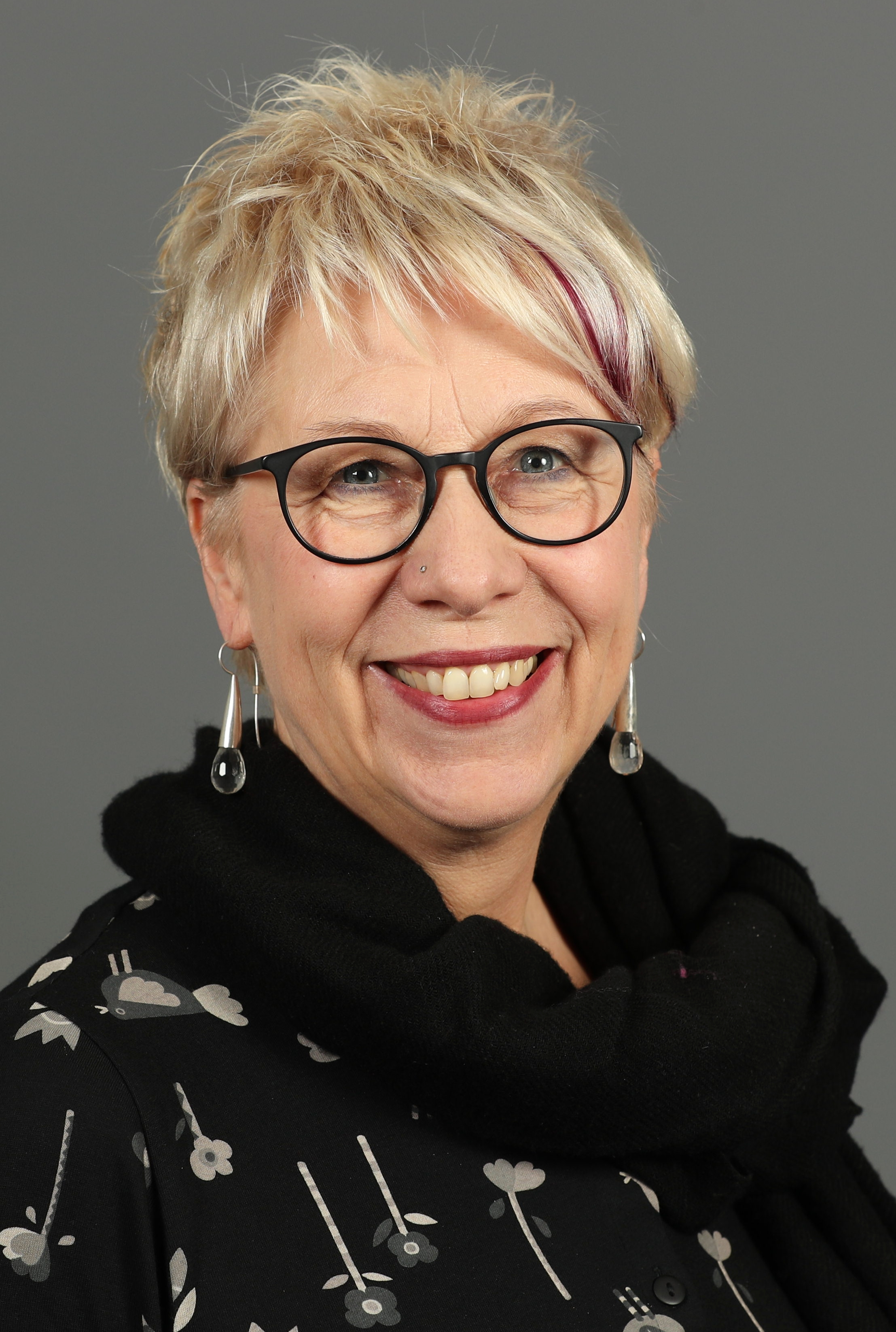
- Birke Bull-Bischoff in 2020

Member of the Bundestag
- In office 2017–2021

Personal details
- Born: 9 November 1963 (age 62) Weißenfels, East Germany
- Party: The Left
- Children: 1

Birke Bull-Bischoff (born 9 November 1963) is a German politician. Born in Weißenfels, Saxony-Anhalt, she represents The Left. Birke Bull-Bischoff has served as a member of the Bundestag from the state of Saxony-Anhalt from 2017 to 2021.

== Life ==
After attending a polytechnic secondary school from 1970 to 1980, Bull-Bischoff studied to become a lower grade teacher at an institute for teacher training until 1984. She then worked as a teacher, among other things for music, at the POS Erich Weinert in Halle. From 1987 to 1989 she was a member of the FDJ district management in Halle. After the fall of the Berlin Wall, she initially worked at a student recreation centre in Halle until 1992. From 1990 to 1994 she worked as a music school teacher at the conservatory Georg-Friedrich-Händel in Halle. Bull-Bischoff studied sociology and education at the Otto-von-Guericke University in Magdeburg from 2003 to 2007. She became member of the bundestag after the 2017 German federal election. She is a member of the Committee for Education, Research and Technology Assessment. She is the spokesperson for education policy for her parliamentary group.

She lost her seat at the 2021 German federal election.
