= Hans-Thomas Tillschneider =

German politician (born 1978)

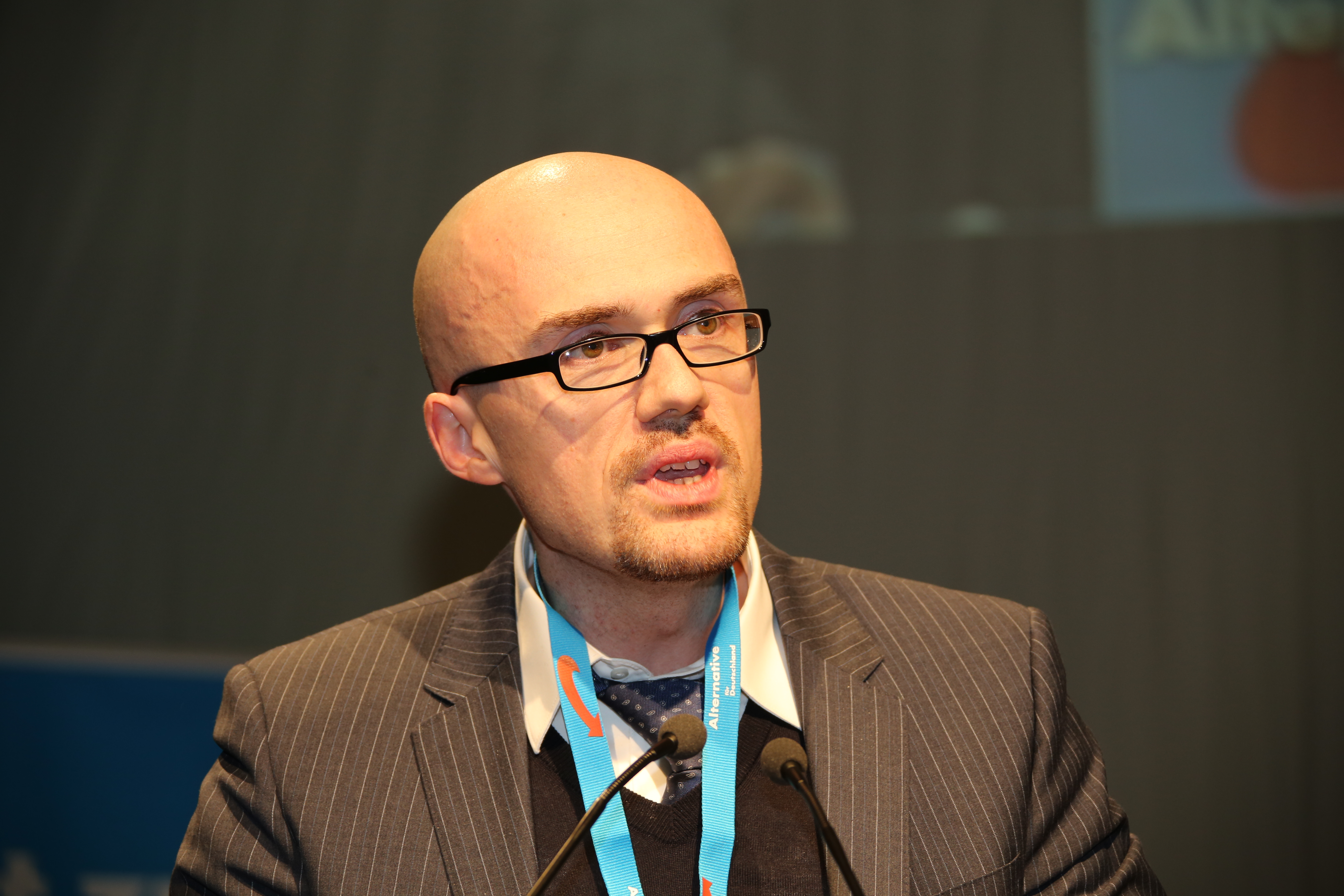
- Tillschneider in 2014

First Vice President of the Landtag of Saxony-Anhalt
- Incumbent
- Assumed office 6 October 2026

Member of the Landtag of Saxony-Anhalt
- Incumbent
- Assumed office 12 April 2016
- Preceded by: Frank Bommersbach
- Constituency: Bad Dürrenberg-Saalekreis (2016–2021), Querfurt (since 2026)

Personal details
- Born: 5 February 1978 (age 48) Timișoara, Romania
- Party: Alternative for Germany (since 2013)
- Other political affiliations: FDP (1996)

Hans-Thomas Tillschneider (born 5 February 1978, Timisoara, Romania) is a far-right German politician serving as the First Vice President of the Landtag of Saxony-Anhalt since 2026 and as a member of the Landtag since 2016.

== Political Career ==
Tillschneider joined Alternative for Germany in 2013, before that he was a member of the Free Democratic Party in 1996.

On 13 February 2020, it was revealed that Tillschneider—along with Björn Höcke and Andreas Kalbitz—has been under surveillance by the Office for the Protection of the Constitution since the beginning of the year.

On 6 October 2026, Tillschneider was elected as one of the Vice-Presidents of the Landtag of Saxony-Anhalt, serving with Carsten Borchert.

== Personal Life ==
Tillschneider is of Banat Swabian heritage.

He has published scholarly research on the Asbab al-Nuzul in Islam.

=== Exclusion from Halle synagogue commemoration ===
On 9 October 2026, Tillschneider, in his capacity as Vice President of the Landtag of Saxony-Anhalt, attempted to attend a memorial service at the Halle synagogue marking the anniversary of the 2019 Halle synagogue shooting. He was scheduled to attend the event as a substitute for Landtag President Tobias Rausch (also AfD). Shortly before the event began, a group of attendees formed a human chain to block Tillschneider from entering the synagogue grounds. Among those leading the protest was Ron Dekel, chairman of the Jewish Students Union Germany (JSUD), who stated: "We will not let our commemoration be hijacked. We will not let right-wing extremists into our synagogues again!"

According to a police spokesperson, the counter-protest was classified as a spontaneous assembly. Representatives from the local assembly authority mediated between Tillschneider and the demonstrators, and the situation remained peaceful. Following a lengthy discussion, Tillschneider left the site. The AfD parliamentary group in the Landtag later issued a statement against left-wing demonstrators for blocking his participation. Tillschneider rejected the label of "right-wing extremist" and subsequently called for a discussion with Max Privorozki, the chairman of the Jewish community in Halle.
