= Hecht (band) =

Swiss pop rock band

- Origin: Lucerne, Switzerland
- Genres: Pop-Rock
- Years active: 2000-present
- Labels: Gadget Records AG
- Members: Stefan Buck (vocals, guitar); Christoph Schröter (guitar); Chris Filter (drums); Philipp Morscher (bass guitar); Daniel Gisler (keyboard)
- Past members: Rolf Furrer (drums)
- Website: www.hechtimnetz.ch

Hecht is a pop rock band hailing from Lucerne, Switzerland. Two of their albums and four of their singles have been awarded gold status in Switzerland and all their full-length albums were in the national charts for multiple weeks. Their album Adam + Eva has also already been awarden platinum status in Switzerland. They perform in the band's native Swiss German language.

== History ==
Together with Rolf Furrer, Stefan Buck and Cristoph Schröter founded the Band Seng, that would later be renamed to Hecht, in the year 2000 in Lucerne. Buck and Schröter were already acquainted with each other from growing up in the same village. In the band's early years their music was performed in English. From 2010 onward they started experimenting with music in the Swiss German language.

In 2011 Philipp Morscher and Daniel Gisler became part of the band. This is also the year in which they changed their name to Hecht and they released their first songs in Swiss German called Tänzer and 24 Bilder as well as the EP Revier Songs. As support group for Baschi and 77 Bombay Street, Hecht got introduced to a broader audience. In May 2012 the band released their first full-length album called Wer zerscht s'Meer gsehd. It peaked at number 72 in the Swiss charts. Following this, the band won in the category Best Talent National at the Swiss Music Awards. In 2015 they contributed the official song for SRF bewegt, a week long health campaign from the Swiss national broadcasting station SRF and the Federal Offices of health, sport and energy.

On 28 August in the same year, their second album Adam + Eva was released. It entered the chart on number 5.

On 9 March 2018 the bands most successful album Oh Boy was released. It peaked at number 2 of the charts and received favourable critique in the press.

On 28 October 2019 Hecht played their largest concert to this day in the Hallenstadion Zurich. During the preparations for this concert the band was accompanied by a film crew and a documentary of it was broadcast on 24 November on the television channel SRF 1

== Music videos ==
Hecht is known for their original and energetic music and live videos in which the band members perform dance choreographies. The band has worked together with the Zurich-based film-producer Claude Gabriel with whom they created videos for their songs Surfer, Heicho, Kawasaki and Prosecco.

== Discography ==
=== Albums ===
Year	Title	Peak chart positions	Album details
2011	Revier Songs (EP)	-	Released, 21 October 2011
2012	Wer zerscht s'Meer gsehd (EP)	75 (3 weeks)	Released, 24 May 2012
2015	Adam + Eva	5 (57 weeks)	Released, 28 August 2015
2018	Oh Boy	2 (55 weeks)	Released, 9 March 2018
2020	Live im Hallenstadion	5 (3 weeks)	Released, 3 January 2020
2022	Hecht for Life	1 (57 weeks)	Released, 8 April 2022

=== Singles ===
- 24 Bilder (2011)
- Tanze tanze (2012)
- Gymnastique (2015)
- Kawasaki (2017)
- Besch ready für die Liebi vo mer? (2019)
- Gsehnd üs im Sommer (2020)
- Nur 1 Minute (2020)
- Prosecco (2021)
- Nimm Mech I Arm (2021)

== Awards ==
- 2013: Swiss Music Awards for "Best Talent National"
- 2017: Swiss Music Awards for "Best Live Act"
- 2020: Swiss Music Awards for "Best Live Act"
