= Felix Zietmann =

German politician (born 1990)

Member of the Landtag of Saxony-Anhalt
- Incumbent
- Assumed office 6 June 2021

Personal details
- Born: 21 October 1990 (age 35) Wolmirstedt
- Party: Alternative for Germany (since 2014)

Felix Zietmann (born 21 October 1990 in Wolmirstedt) is a German politician serving as a member of the Landtag of Saxony-Anhalt since 2021. He has been a member of the Alternative for Germany since 2014.
