= Gordon Köhler =

German politician (born 1987)

Member of the Landtag of Saxony-Anhalt
- Incumbent
- Assumed office 6 June 2021

Personal details
- Born: 1987 (age 38–39) Magdeburg
- Party: Alternative for Germany (since 2014)

Gordon Köhler (born 1987 in Magdeburg) is a German politician serving as a member of the Landtag of Saxony-Anhalt since 2021. He has served as chairman of the Alternative for Germany in Jerichower Land since 2017.
