= Jan Moldenhauer =

German politician (born 1980)

Member of the Landtag of Saxony-Anhalt
- Incumbent
- Assumed office 6 June 2021

Personal details
- Born: 5 December 1980 (age 45) Bergisch Gladbach
- Party: Alternative for Germany (since 2014)

Jan Moldenhauer (born 5 December 1980 in Bergisch Gladbach) is a German politician serving as a member of the Landtag of Saxony-Anhalt since 2021. He has served as chairman of the Alternative for Germany in Magdeburg since 2020.
