= Daniel Hecht =

American novelist

- Born: 1950 (age 75–76); Mount Kisco, New York, U.S.
- Education: Iowa Writers' Workshop (MFA)
- Occupations: Novelist; musician; adjunct professor; project coordinator; environmental consultant
- Writing career
- Years active: 1997–present
- Genres: Literary fiction, Speculative fiction, supernatural fiction, mystery fiction
- Notable works: The Cree Black Series, The Babel Effect, Puppets
- Website: www.danielhecht.com

Daniel Hecht (born 1950) is an American author, environmentalist, and nonprofit development consultant. He has written eight novels that have been published in 13 languages and over 100 editions throughout the world, including best-sellers in the United States, Britain, the Netherlands, and Israel.

== Early life ==
Born in Croton Falls, New York, Hecht has lived in New York; the Philippines; Wisconsin; Washington, DC; Virginia; Illinois; California; and Vermont.

== Musical career ==
Hecht began playing classical guitar in 1965, studying under John Mavreas at the North Shore Conservatory in Winnetka, Illinois, and James Yoghourtjian at the Wisconsin College Conservatory. After studying music theory and composition at the University of Wisconsin, he played acoustic 6 and 12 string guitar and published three records: "Guitar" (1973), "Fireheart-Fireriver" (1977), released on Dragon's Egg Records, and "Willow" (1980), released on Windham Hill. “Willow” was also released in Europe, and Hecht's individual compositions appear on compilation albums and videos. He performed over 300 concerts throughout the United States, Europe, and China, both solo and with other musicians including Alex deGrassi, Michael Hedges, George Winston, Jonathan Winter, and John Fahey. Significant venues include Carnegie Recital Hall (1969 and 1982), Great American Music Hall, Shanghai Conservatory, Beijing Conservatory, Faneuil Hall, and others.

== Organizational development ==
Hecht is an organizational development consultant active in the arts, environmental technology, and social services. He served as board president of the Pyralisk Arts Center, in Montpelier, Vermont, from 1990 to 2003; he then served as executive director of Vermont Environmental Consortium (VEC), a statewide association of environmental science and technology firms, educational institutions, public agencies, and non-profit organizations based at Norwich University. From 2008 to 2011, he was project manager for a three-year, U.S. Dept. of Energy study to determine the feasibility of using food waste biodigestion as an energy source. He served as executive director of Reach Service Exchange Network, a project of the City of Montpelier funded by the U.S. Agency on Aging to develop a mutual exchange system to assist seniors and persons with disabilities. From 2016 to 2022, he served as executive director of Green Mountain Water Environment Association, a nonprofit supporting the education and certification of drinking water, wastewater, and stormwater professionals.

As director of VEC, he was commissioned by the Vermont Agency of Agriculture to produce "The Farm Energy Handbook," which he edited and co-wrote with 20 renewable energy and energy efficiency/conservation experts. He produced and scripted "The Green Makeover Video," a 45-minute video showing small businesses how to implement energy-efficiency and other green business practices, in collaboration with the Vermont Department of Public Service, Vermont Small Business Development Center, Efficiency Vermont, and other partners. His bi-weekly column, "The Green Grapevine," featuring profiles of Vermont green enterprises and current issues and developments in emerging green technologies, ran in five Vermont daily newspapers in 2006 - 2008.

From 2008 to 2011, he procured funding for and served as project manager for a study of Vermont's potential to produce energy from post-consumer food waste, funded by a $600,000 grant from the US Department of Energy. Conducted in partnership with Central Vermont Solid Waste Management District and Vermont Technical College, the study led to the construction in 2013 of a $3.5 million food-waste and manure biodigester sited at Vermont Tech campus. For two years, starting in 2011, he directed Reach Service Exchange Network, a $1 million pilot program, funded by the US Administration on Aging, to deliver helping services to seniors and people with disabilities.

As executive director of Green Mountain Water Environment Association (GMWEA) from 2016 to 2022, he oversaw all operations of a 500-member trade association supporting water quality professionals, providing policy advocacy, and conducting public education initiatives, such as the U.S. EPA-funded "Don't Flush It!" publication series.

== Post-secondary educational activities ==
Hecht has taught literature and writing courses at the University of Iowa, Community College of Vermont, and Johnson State College. From 2010 to 2020, he was a faculty member in the Professional Writing Program at Champlain College, in Burlington, Vermont, teaching Advanced Fiction Writing, Technical Writing, Grant Writing, and Creative Writing.

== Bibliography ==
- Skull Session (1997)
- The Babel Effect (2000)
- Puppets (2001)
- City of Masks (2002)
- Land of Echoes (2004)
- Bones of the Barbary Coast (2006)
- On Brassard's Farm (2018).
- The Body Below (2023).
