= Tobias Rausch =

German politician (born 1990)

President of the Landtag of Saxony-Anhalt
- Incumbent
- Assumed office 6 October 2026
- Preceded by: Gunnar Schellenberger

Member of the Landtag of Saxony-Anhalt
- Incumbent
- Assumed office 12 April 2016

Personal details
- Born: 28 November 1990 (age 35) Mellrichstadt, Bavaria, Germany
- Party: Alternative for Germany
- Parent: Daniel Rausch (father)

Tobias Rausch (born 28 November 1990) is a German politician of the AfD party. He serves as President of the Landtag of Saxony-Anhalt since 2026, the first AfD member to become the presiding officer of a German state parliament.

Rausch has been a member of the Landtag since 2016 and head of the AfD parliamentarian group from 2021 to 2026.

== Early life ==
Tobias Rausch grew up in Staßfurt. He is the son of former Saxony-Anhalt AfD MP Daniel Rausch.

== Career ==
He did an apprenticeship as a car mechanic and later worked in real estate. Rausch is CEO of the real estate company Rausch Immobilien GmbH in Hecklingen.

He became a member of AfD in 2013. Rausch has been a member of the state parliament and deputy parliamentary group leader since 2016, and parliamentary group leader since 2021.

== Alleged cronyism ==
In 2026 cronyism in AfD was disclosed by media outlets. In AfD Saxony-Anhalt politicians employed friends, relatives and the partners of their AfD party friends. At times, several of Rausch’s siblings were employed by AfD Bundestag member Claudia Weiss. Rausch stated that he had not been involved in their hiring. He employed several players from his football club, SV 09 Staßfurt, in his parliamentary office at various times. Rausch also serves as the chairman of SV 09 Straßfurt. No criminal investigations were conducted.
