= Andreas Mrosek =

German politician (born 1958)

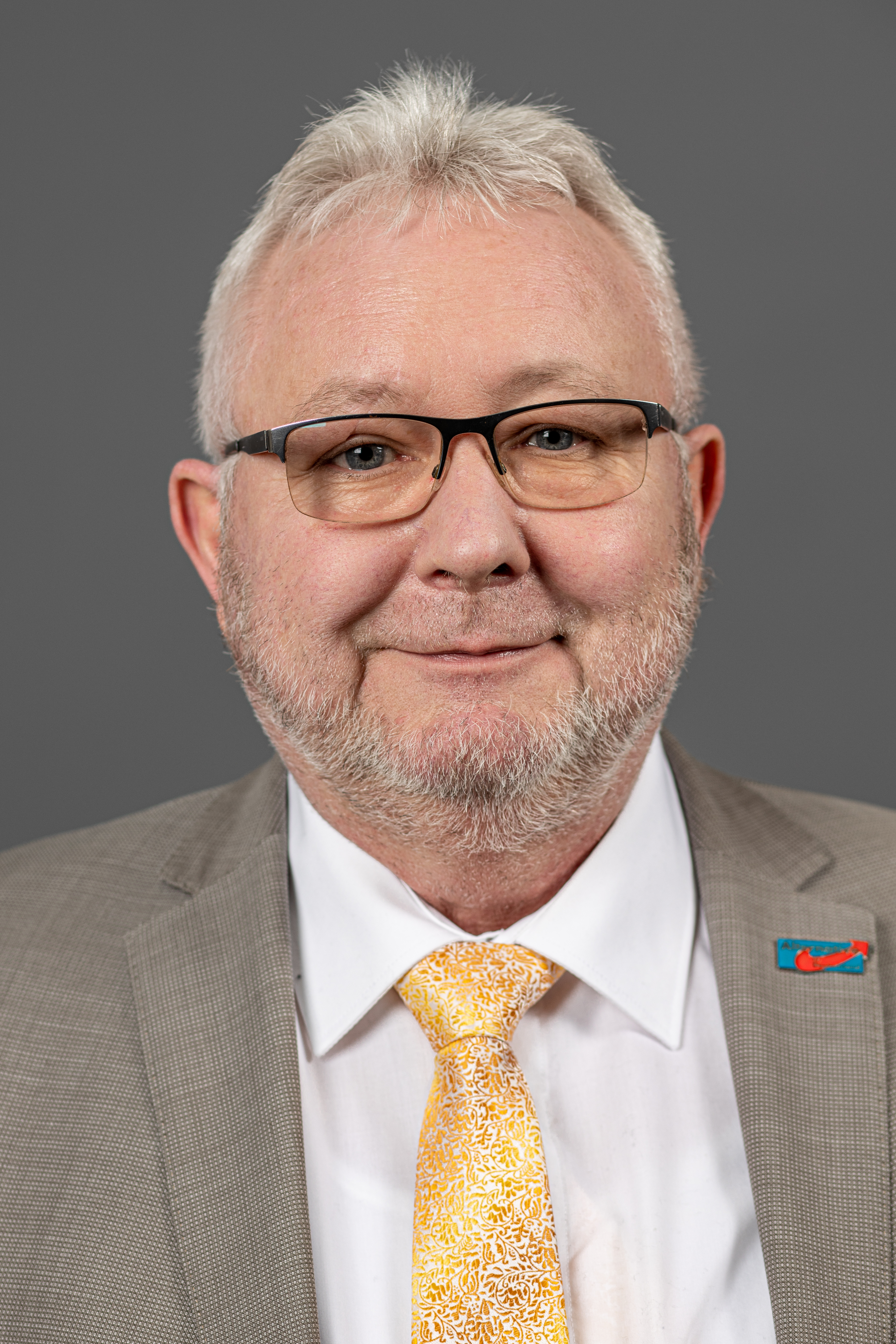
- Andreas Mrosek in 2019

Member of the Bundestag
- Incumbent
- Assumed office 2017

Personal details
- Born: 18 January 1958 (age 68) Dessau, East Germany (now Germany)
- Party: AfD

Andreas Mrosek (born 18 January 1958) is a German politician. Born in Dessau, Saxony-Anhalt, he represents Alternative for Germany (AfD). Andreas Mrosek has served as a member of the Bundestag from the state of Saxony-Anhalt since 2017.

== Life ==
He became member of the Bundestag after the 2017 German federal election. He is a member of the Sports Committee and the Committee for Transport and Digital Infrastructure.
