= Feest =

Feest is a surname. Notable people with the surname include:

- Christian Feest (born 1945), Austrian ethnologist and ethnohistorian
- Gerhard Feest (born 1941, adopted 2000 the name Gleich of his second wife), Austrian artist and professor emeritus of the Academy of Fine Arts Vienna in Vienna
- Gregory A. Feest (born 1956), United States Air Force Air Force major general
- Johannes Feest (born 1939), German penologist and sociologist of law

== See also ==
- Alle dagen feest, Dutch film
- Fest (disambiguation)
