= AfD Berlin =

Political party in Germany

- Leader: Kristin Brinker
- Headquarters: Kurfürstenstraße 79 10785 Berlin
- Ideology: Right-wing populism National conservatism
- Political position: Far-right
- National affiliation: Alternative for Germany
- Colors: Light blue
- Abgeordnetenhaus of Berlin: 17 / 159

Website
- https://afd.berlin

AfD Berlin is the Berlin state chapter of the far-right party Alternative for Germany (AfD). The state chapter is led by Kristin Brinker as state chairwoman. With Georg Pazderski as its lead candidate, the state party first ran in the 2016 election and entered the Berlin House of Representatives as the fifth-largest faction. With Kristin Brinker as its lead candidate, the party entered the House of Representatives in 2021 and 2023.

== History ==
The Berlin regional association was founded on April 27, 2013. The first chairman of the AfD Berlin was Günter Brinker, management consultant and long-time president of the Berlin branch of the Taxpayers' Association of Germany, who advocated a more national-liberal course. The national-conservative wing of the federal party, led by Alexander Gauland, was dissatisfied with Brinker. Against the resistance of the then state leadership, Hans-Joachim Berg introduced the Blue Circles, Berlin-wide regulars' tables at which Jürgen Elsässer, a journalist from the Querfront magazine Compact, spoke, among others. Brinker was heavily attacked in a special edition of the AfD-affiliated magazine Polifakt. The publication was produced by the same company that later produced the so-called Extrablatt and presents itself as politically independent.

In mid-February 2016, two national conservatives, Beatrix von Storch (then AfD MEP) and Georg Pazderski (former AfD federal director), were elected to the leadership of the Berlin AfD. Following the election to the state executive committee in January 2016, allegations of fraud arose. Two party members allegedly attempted to vote twice at the state party conference. Subsequently, expulsion proceedings were initiated against the two AfD members, and the ballots were recounted by a notary. A complaint was also filed against them with the public prosecutor's office. A graphologist was asked to check whether there were multiple ballots with the same handwriting. Some party members who distrusted the elected executive committee had requested permission to be present at the recount. However, this request was rejected by the AfD leadership. One week after the election, Götz Frömming, who had been a member of the state executive committee since the founding of the state association, resigned from his position as deputy state chairman. In February 2017, the party's arbitration court ruled, following a lawsuit by Heike Rubert and Frank Scheermesser, that the election of the assessors had to be repeated due to irregularities and members must be informed of the verdict. The party's Federal Arbitration Court upheld the State Arbitration Court's ruling in the summer of 2017. By the beginning of September 2017, neither the members had been informed of the verdict nor had a new election for the board been scheduled. The new board was elected in November 2017.

On September 18, 2016, the state party, with Georg Pazderski as its top candidate, received 14.2 percent of the votes in the 2016 Berlin House of Representatives election and entered the House of Representatives with 25 elected representatives. In the simultaneous elections for the district councils, the state party entered all twelve district parliaments at the municipal level, achieving double-digit results in nine districts. In seven districts, the AfD was able to appoint one of five city councilors for the first time.

At the inaugural meeting on September 21, 2016, lead candidate Georg Pazderski was elected parliamentary group leader. Kay Nerstheimer had previously announced his resignation from the parliamentary group.

At the beginning of July 2017, Neukölln's environmental councillor Bernward Eberenz resigned from the AfD because of the short-term nomination of Andreas Wild as a direct candidate for the 2017 German federal election. Shortly afterwards, Wild’s nomination was withdrawn and he was expelled from the AfD parliamentary group. In 2023, Wild was expelled from the party.

In November 2018, the Berlin AfD had 1,500 members, around 230 more than a year earlier.

From January 2020, the regional association was led by an emergency board led by chairman Nicolaus Fest. In January 2021, the number of members fell to 1342.> Beatrix von Storch lost the election for the state chairmanship of the Berlin AfD at the AfD state party conference on 13 March 2021 with 120:122 votes against Kristin Brinker.

== Election results ==
2023 Berlin state election results. AfD in the Blue. The AfD tends to be stronger in the former East Berlin.

2025 German federal election In Berlin, AfD in the Blue

State Parliament (Landtag)

State election, year	No. of overall votes	% of overall vote & ranking	No. of overall seats won	+/–
Berlin, 2016	231,325	14.2 (#5) (Note: Got 12.1 (#4) in West Berlin, and Got 17.0 (#3) in East Berlin)	25 / 160	
Berlin, 2021	145,712	8.00 (#5) (Note: Got 6.3 (#6) in West Berlin, and Got 10.4 (#5) in East Berlin)	13 / 147	Clerk declined 12
Berlin, 2023	137,871	9.09 (#5) (Note: Got 6.8 (#5) in West Berlin, and Got 12.2 (#5) in East Berlin)	17 / 88	▲4

== See also ==
- AfD Saxony
- AfD Saxony-Anhalt
- AfD Thuringia
- AfD Brandenburg
