= Kristin Brinker =

German politician (born 1972)

Kristin Brinker MdA
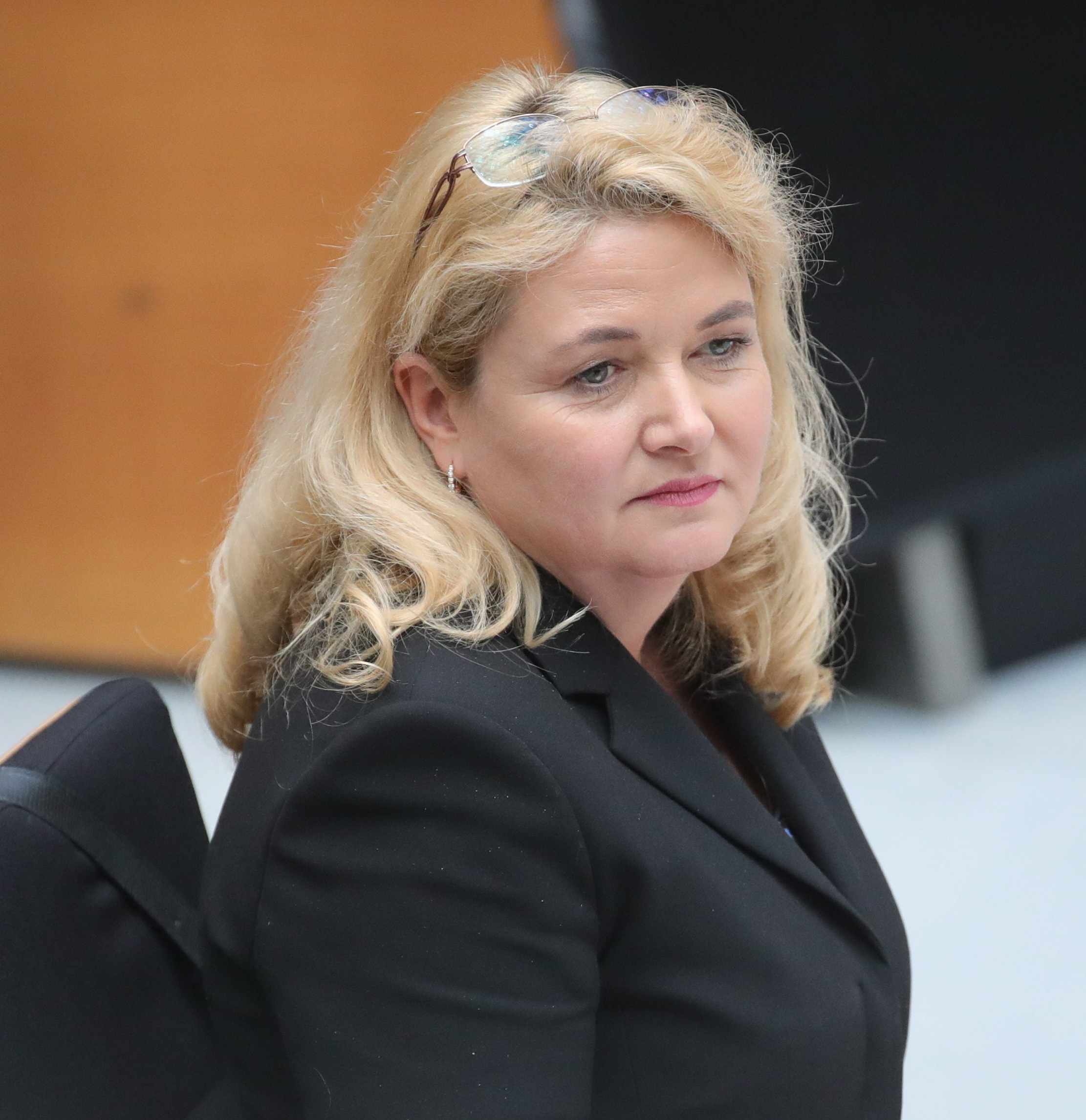
- Brinker in 2023

Leader of the Alternative for Germany in Berlin
- Incumbent
- Assumed office 13 March 2021
- Deputy: Alexander Bertram; Ronald Gläser; Rolf Wiedenhaupt; Jeannette Auricht
- Preceded by: Nicolaus Fest (acting)

Leader of the AfD in the Abgeordnetenhaus of Berlin
- Incumbent
- Assumed office 29 September 2021
- Preceded by: Georg Pazderski

Member of the Abgeordnetenhaus of Berlin
- Incumbent
- Assumed office 27 October 2016
- Constituency: Alternative for Germany List

Personal details
- Born: 6 April 1972 (age 54) Bernburg, Bezirk Halle, East Germany
- Party: AfD (since 2013)
- Spouse: Günter Brinker (m. 1996)
- Education: Technische Universität Berlin
- Occupation: Architect • Politician

Kristin Brinker (born 6 April 1972) is a German politician. A member of the Alternative for Germany (AfD) party, Brinker has been a member of the Berlin House of Representatives since 2016. Brinker has been state chair of the Berlin AfD since March 2021.

== Life ==
Kristin Brinker was born in Bernburg in the Bezirk Halle of East Germany in 1972 and, according to her own account, grew up working-class. Brinker became an investment advisor at the Berliner Volksbank and trained as a cooperative bank clerk.

Brinker was head of German Taxpayers Federation Berlin from 2012 to 2016 and then founding the Berlin state organization of far-right Alternative for Germany.

Brinker joined the AfD in 2013 and is considered part of the "more liberal" wing of the party. Brinker defeated Beatrix von Storch in 2021 to become chair of the Berlin AfD.
