= Wiebke Papenbrock =

German politician

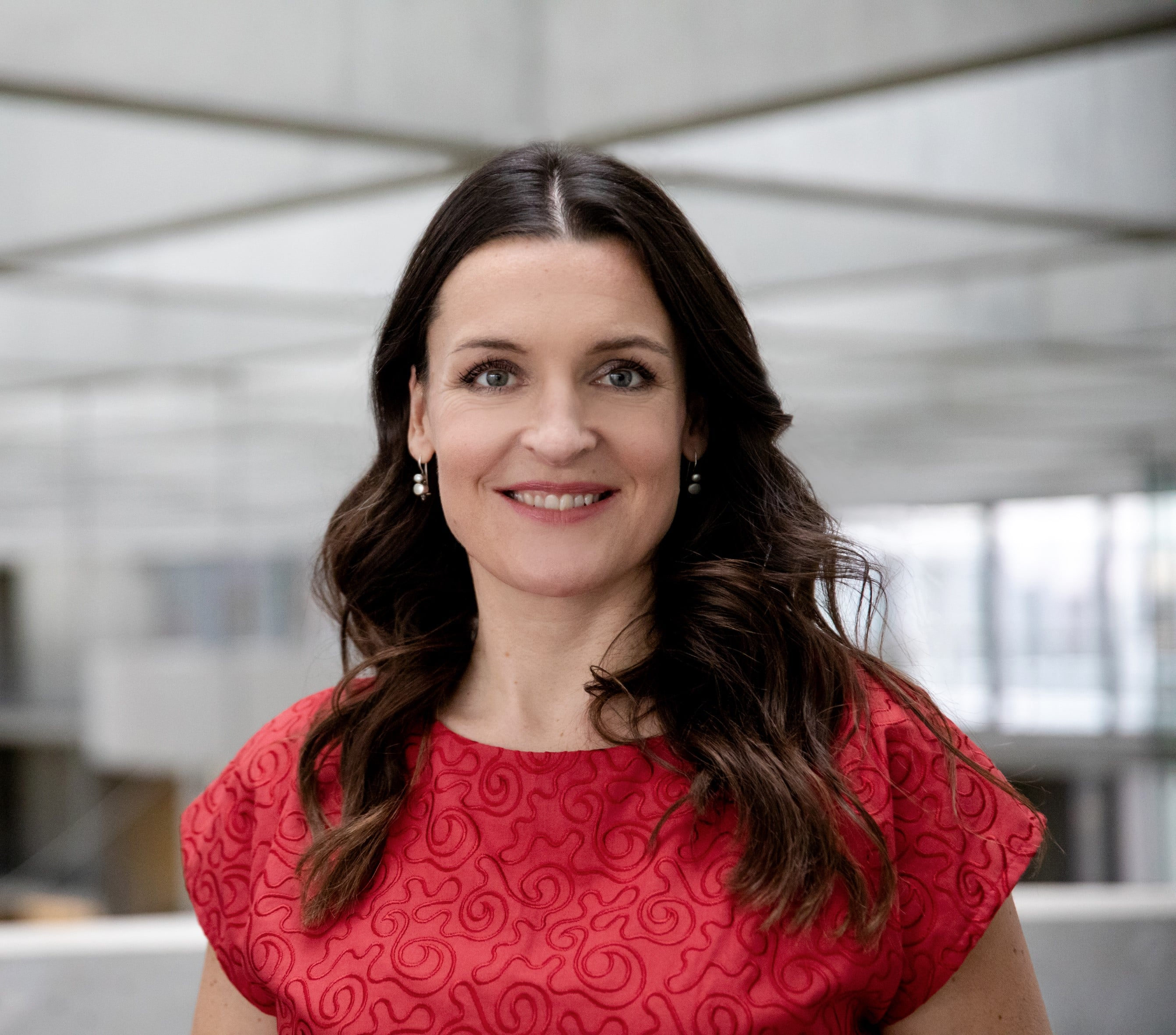
- Papenbrock in 2021

Member of the Bundestag; for Prignitz – Ostprignitz-Ruppin – Havelland I
- In office 26 October 2021 – 25 March 2025
- Preceded by: Sebastian Steineke
- Succeeded by: Götz Frömming

Personal details
- Born: 24 November 1979 (age 46) East Berlin, East Germany
- Party: Social Democratic
- Children: 2
- Education: Humboldt University of Berlin

Wiebke Papenbrock (born 24 November 1979) is a German politician of the Social Democratic Party (SPD) who served as a member of the Bundestag from 2021 to 2025.

== Early life and career ==
Papenbrock was born 1979 in East Berlin. In 2018, she received a master's degree in Religion and Culture from the Humboldt University of Berlin.

Early in her career, Papenbrock served as a parliamentary advisor to Ernst Bahr (2006–2009) and later to Sonja Steffen (2009–2016). From 2016 until 2021, she worked for the Press and Information Office of the Federal Government.

== Political career ==
Papenbrock entered the SPD in 2012 and became member of the Bundestag in the 2021 elections, representing the Prignitz – Ostprignitz-Ruppin – Havelland I district.

In parliament, Papenbrock served on the Budget Committee and its Subcommittee on European Affairs. In this capacity, she was her parliamentary group's rapporteur on the annual budget of the Federal Foreign Office. She was also a member of the so-called Confidential Committee (Vertrauensgremium) of the Budget Committee, which provides budgetary supervision for Germany's three intelligence services, BND, BfV and MAD. In February 2025, Papenbrock lost her seat in the Bundestag.

== See also ==
- List of members of the 20th Bundestag
