= Neil Denari =

American architect

- Born: September 3, 1957 (age 69); Fort Worth, Texas
- Education: Harvard University; University of Houston
- Occupations: architect, professor, and author
- Website: denari.co

Neil Denari (b. Fort Worth, Texas September 3, 1957) is an American architect, professor, and author based in Los Angeles since 1988. Denari emerged in New York during the 1980s with a series of theoretical projects and texts based on the collapse of the machine aesthetic of Modernism. His office, Neil M. Denari Architects (NMDA) is dedicated to exploring the realms of architecture, design, urbanism, and all aspects of contemporary life. As a teacher for more than 20 years, Denari has held visiting professorships at UC Berkeley, Columbia, Princeton, University of Pennsylvania, and the University of Texas at Arlington. Denari is a tenured professor at UCLA where he has been teaching since 2002.

== Early life and education ==
Denari received a Bachelor's degree in Architecture in 1980 from the University of Houston and in 1982, he earned a Master's degree from Harvard University. While at Harvard, he studied the philosophy of science and also art theory with the expatriate Austrian artist Paul Rotterdam, whom Denari has cited as his most influential teacher.

== Career ==
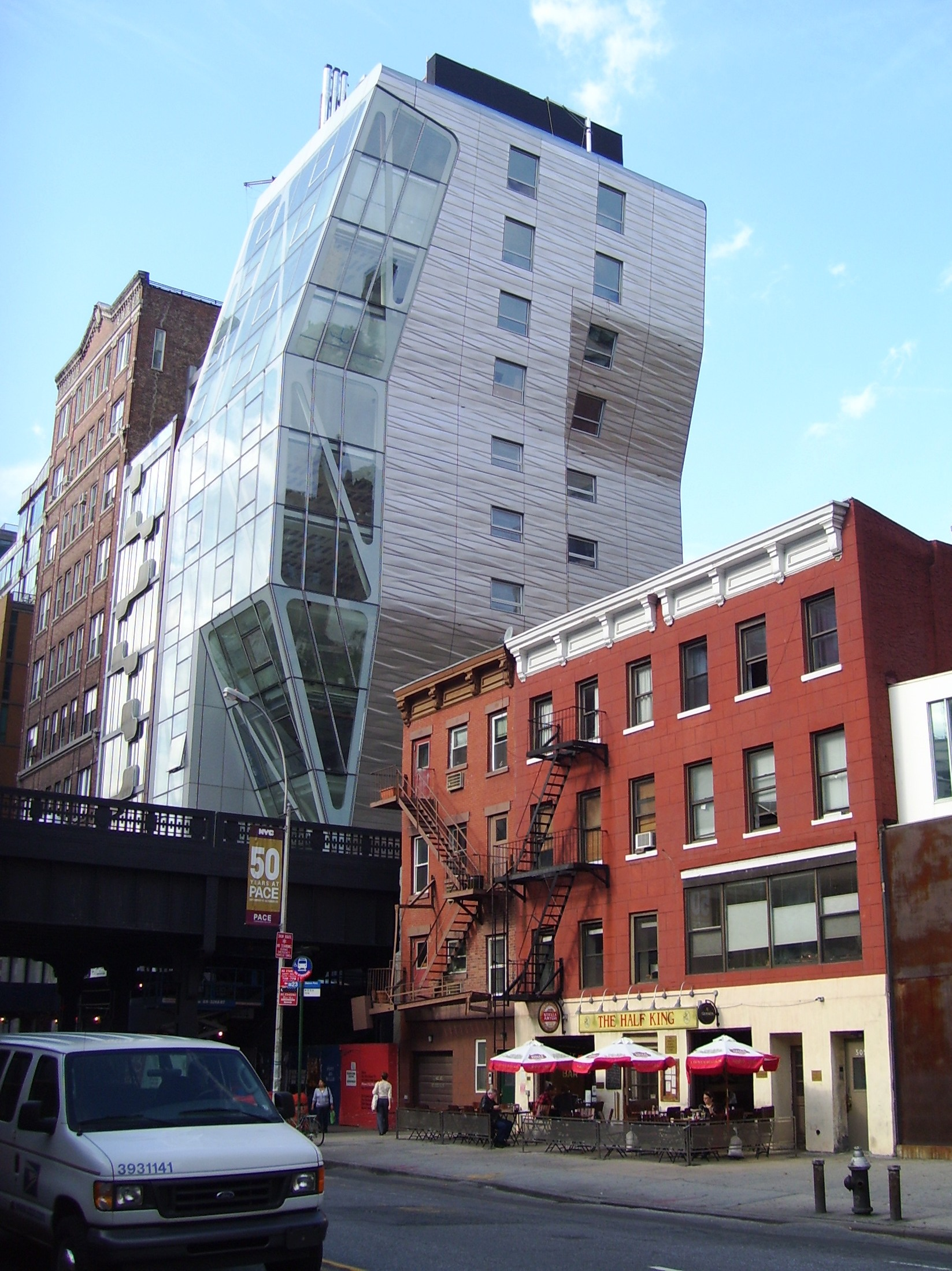
Denari's "HL23" luxury apartment building looms over the High Line and its neighboring buildings on West 23rd Street in the Chelsea neighborhood of Manhattan in New York City

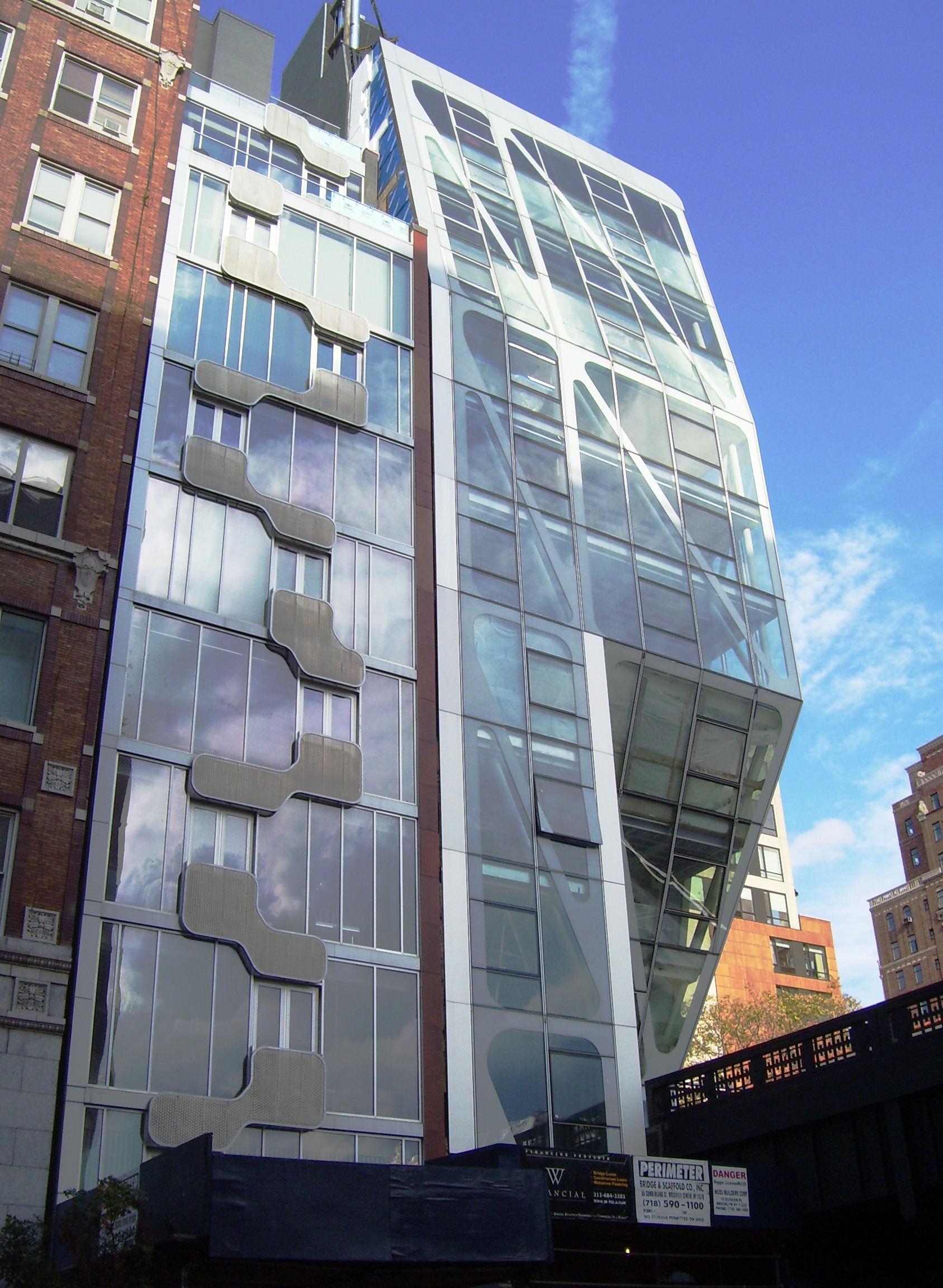
"HL23" at 517 West 23rd Street (right) sits next to South African architect Lindy Roy's "Highline 519" at 519 West 23rd (left), another luxury apartment building

After graduate studies, Denari worked for five months as an intern in Paris for Aerospatiale – now Airbus – one of Europe's largest aviation contractors. Following this, Denari lived and worked in New York City from 1983 to 1988, first at James Stewart Polshek & Partners as a senior designer, before beginning to teach at Columbia University's Graduate School of Architecture and Planning in 1986. During this five-year period in New York, Denari produced a series of self generated projects and participated in numerous exhibitions, most notably at P.S. 1 in Long Island City in the fall of 1986. That year he also won a Fellowship from the New York Foundation for the Arts. In 2008, Denari was given an Award from the American Academy of Arts and Letters for his strong personal direction in design. In 2009 he was the recipient of a 2009 Fellows Award from United States Artists.

Denari founded his firm in Los Angeles in 1988. He began teaching at SCI-Arc that year and from 1997 to 2002, was the Director at this school of architecture. Denari has used the city of Los Angeles as a resource and laboratory for urban and cultural experiments. In 1990 and 1991, he worked on several small projects and taught architecture in Tokyo. This period of time, prior to the collapse of the Japanese bubble economy, gave Denari the opportunity to study both the historical and contemporary aspects of Japanese culture. These experiences have had a continued impact on his work.

Gyroscopic Horizons, a book written by Denari documenting his architectural projects as well as his ideas and theories on contemporary culture, was jointly published in September 1999 by Princeton Architectural Press and Thames and Hudson. Currently Denari is at work on a monograph entitled Speculations On which will be published in 2011 by AADCU of Beijing.

Denari's drawings and models are part of seven permanent collections: Cooper-Hewitt Museum, San Francisco Museum of Modern Art (SFMOMA), Fonds régional d'art contemporain (FRAC) in Orléans, France, Museum of Modern Art (MOMA) in New York, Denver Art Museum, Heinz Architectural Center of Carnegie Museum of Art, and Museum of Contemporary Art, Sydney. In 2002, Denari's work was chosen to be a part of the National Academy of Design's annual exhibition in New York, where he also received both the Samuel Morse Medal and the Richard Recchia Prize for his work.

== Bibliography ==
- 1996, Interrupted Projections
- 1999, Gyroscopic Horizons ISBN 978-1878271136
- 2015, Chromatopia: Generally Different Towers for Shanghai ISBN 978-0977194568
- 2018, Neil Denari: The Baumer Lectures (Source Books in Architecture) ISBN 1940743273
