= Prignitz – Ostprignitz-Ruppin – Havelland I =

Federal electoral district of Germany

56 Prignitz – Ostprignitz-Ruppin – Havelland I
- Electoral district for the Bundestag
- Prignitz – Ostprignitz-Ruppin – Havelland I in 2025
- State: Brandenburg
- Population: 208,900 (2019)
- Electorate: 172,726 (2021)
- Major settlements: Neuruppin; Nauen; Wittenberge
- Area: 5,673.7 km^{2}

Current electoral district
- Created: 1990
- Party: AfD
- Member: Götz Frömming
- Elected: 2025

Prignitz – Ostprignitz-Ruppin – Havelland I is an electoral constituency (German: Wahlkreis) represented in the Bundestag. It elects one member via first-past-the-post voting. Under the current constituency numbering system, it is designated as constituency 56. It is located in northwestern Brandenburg, comprising the Prignitz district, Ostprignitz-Ruppin district, and most of the Havelland district.

Prignitz – Ostprignitz-Ruppin – Havelland I was created for the inaugural 1990 federal election after German reunification. From 2021 to 2025, it was represented by Wiebke Papenbrock of the Social Democratic Party (SPD). Since 2025 it has been represented by Götz Frömming of the AfD.

== Geography ==
Prignitz – Ostprignitz-Ruppin – Havelland I is located in northwestern Brandenburg. As of the 2021 federal election, it comprises the entirety of the districts of Prignitz and Ostprignitz-Ruppin, as well as the municipality of Nauen and the Ämter of Friesack, Nennhausen, and Rhinow from the Havelland district.

== History ==
Prignitz – Ostprignitz-Ruppin – Havelland I was created after German reunification in 1990, then known as Neuruppin – Kyritz – Wittstock – Pritzwalk – Perleberg. It acquired its current name in the 2002 election. In the 1990 through 1998 elections, it was constituency 271 in the numbering system. In the 2002 and 2005 elections, it was number 56. In the 2009 election, it was number 57. Since the 2013 election, it has been number 56.

Originally, the constituency comprised the districts of Neuruppin, Kyritz, Wittstock, Pritzwalk, and Perleberg. It acquired its current configuration in the 2002 election, as Neuruppin, Kyritz, and Wittstock were merged into the Ostprignitz-Ruppin district, and Pritzwalk and Perleberg merged into the Prignitz district. It also acquired the Ämter of Friesack and Rhinow from the Havelland district. In the 2017 election, the municipality of Nauen and the Amt of Nennhausen were transferred into the constituency.

Election	No.	Name	Borders
1990	271	Neuruppin – Kyritz – Wittstock – Pritzwalk – Perleberg	Neuruppin district; Kyritz district; Wittstock district; Pritzwalk district; Perleberg district
1994	271	Neuruppin – Kyritz – Wittstock – Pritzwalk – Perleberg	Neuruppin district; Kyritz district; Wittstock district; Pritzwalk district; Perleberg district
1998	271	Neuruppin – Kyritz – Wittstock – Pritzwalk – Perleberg	Neuruppin district; Kyritz district; Wittstock district; Pritzwalk district; Perleberg district
2002	56	Prignitz – Ostprignitz-Ruppin – Havelland I	Prignitz district; Ostprignitz-Ruppin district; Havelland (only Friesack and Rhinow Ämter)
2005	56	Prignitz – Ostprignitz-Ruppin – Havelland I	Prignitz district; Ostprignitz-Ruppin district; Havelland (only Friesack and Rhinow Ämter)
2009	57	Prignitz – Ostprignitz-Ruppin – Havelland I	Prignitz district; Ostprignitz-Ruppin district; Havelland (only Friesack and Rhinow Ämter)
2013	56	Prignitz – Ostprignitz-Ruppin – Havelland I	Prignitz district; Ostprignitz-Ruppin district; Havelland (only Friesack and Rhinow Ämter)
2017	56	Prignitz – Ostprignitz-Ruppin – Havelland I	Prignitz district; Ostprignitz-Ruppin district; Havelland (only Nauen municipality and Friesack, Nennhausen, and Rhinow Ämter)
2021	56	Prignitz – Ostprignitz-Ruppin – Havelland I	Prignitz district; Ostprignitz-Ruppin district; Havelland (only Nauen municipality and Friesack, Nennhausen, and Rhinow Ämter)
2025	56	Prignitz – Ostprignitz-Ruppin – Havelland I	Prignitz district; Ostprignitz-Ruppin district; Havelland (only Nauen municipality and Friesack, Nennhausen, and Rhinow Ämter)

== Members ==
The constituency was first represented by Rosemarie Priebus of the Christian Democratic Union (CDU) from 1990 to 1994. It was won by the Social Democratic Party (SPD) in 1994, and represented by Ernst Bahr until 2009. Dagmar Ziegler of the SPD served a single term from 2009 until 2013, when it was won by CDU candidate Sebastian Steineke. Wiebke Papenbrock regained it for the SPD in 2021.

Election	Member	Party	%
1990	Rosemarie Priebus	CDU	41.7
1994	Ernst Bahr	SPD	50.1
1998	Ernst Bahr	SPD	52.6
2002	Ernst Bahr	SPD	48.2
2005	Ernst Bahr	SPD	38.5
2009	Dagmar Ziegler	SPD	32.1
2013	Sebastian Steineke	CDU	33.5
2017	Sebastian Steineke	CDU	30.8
2021	Wiebke Papenbrock	SPD	33.0
2025	Götz Frömming	AfD	38.9

== Election results ==
=== 2025 election ===
Federal election (2025): Prignitz – Ostprignitz-Ruppin – Havelland I
Notes:	Blue background denotes the winner of the electorate vote. Pink background denotes a candidate elected from their party list. Yellow background denotes an electorate win by a list member, or other incumbent. A ✓ or ✗ denotes status of any incumbent, win or lose respectively.						
Party	Candidate	Votes	%	±%	Party votes	%	±%
AfD	Götz Frömming	51,212	38.9	▲19.2	48,277	36.6	▲17.4
SPD	✗ Wiebke Papenbrock	29,264	22.2	▼10.7	20,999	15.9	▼18.1
CDU	Sebastian Steineke	25,861	19.6	▲0.3	22,920	17.4	▲1.3
BSW					14,073	10.7	New
Left	Daniel Irrgang	13,866	10.5	▲1.6	12,905	9.8	▲1.7
Greens	Martin Wandrey	5,782	4.4	▼2.0	5,782	4.4	▼2.0
FW	Georg Kamrath	4,561	3.5	▼0.3	1,914	1.4	▼1.1
FDP	Marie Kretschmer	2,847	2.2	▼3.9	3,355	2.5	▼5.0
PARTEI					913	0.7	▼0.4
Volt					518	0.4	▲0.2
BD					291	0.2	New
MLPD					74	0.1	0.0
Informal votes		1,431			1,046		
Total valid votes		131,636			132,021		
Turnout		133,067	78.4	▲7.5			
AfD gain from SPD	Majority	21,948	15.8	N/A			

=== 2021 election ===
Federal election (2021): Prignitz – Ostprignitz-Ruppin – Havelland I
Notes:	Blue background denotes the winner of the electorate vote. Pink background denotes a candidate elected from their party list. Yellow background denotes an electorate win by a list member, or other incumbent. A ✓ or ✗ denotes status of any incumbent, win or lose respectively.						
Party	Candidate	Votes	%	±%	Party votes	%	±%
SPD	Wiebke Papenbrock	39,853	33.0	▲9.3	41,163	34.0	▲13.0
AfD	Dominik Kaufner	23,799	19.7	▲1.7	23,221	19.2	▲0.5
CDU	✗ Sebastian Steineke	23,433	19.4	▼11.4	19,414	16.0	▼13.7
Left	Anja Mayer	10,845	9.0	▼8.6	9,754	8.1	▼8.4
FDP	Thomas Essig	7,355	6.1	▲2.5	9,070	7.5	▲2.0
Greens	Maximilian Kowol	5,623	4.7	▲1.7	7,677	6.3	▲2.8
FW	Michael Güldener	4,549	3.8	▲2.5	3,060	2.5	▲1.5
Tierschutzpartei					2,557	2.1	▲0.9
PARTEI	Corvin Drößler	2,180	1.8	▲0.5	1,373	1.1	▲0.1
dieBasis	Stephan Dietzsch	1,771	1.5		1,580	1.3	
Pirates	Axel Heidkamp	636	0.5		479	0.4	
Independent	Willi Eckelmann	498	0.4				
NPD					473	0.4	▼0.5
Unabhängige					459	0.4	
Independent	Norbert Glamann	295	0.2				
Volt					194	0.2	
Team Todenhöfer					151	0.1	
Humanists					112	0.1	
ÖDP					111	0.1	0.0
MLPD					86	0.1	▼0.1
DKP					74	0.1	0.0
Informal votes		1,675			1,504		
Total valid votes		120,837			121,008		
Turnout		122,512	70.9	▲2.6			
SPD gain from CDU	Majority	16,054	13.3				

=== 2017 election ===
Federal election (2017): Prignitz – Ostprignitz-Ruppin – Havelland I
Notes:	Blue background denotes the winner of the electorate vote. Pink background denotes a candidate elected from their party list. Yellow background denotes an electorate win by a list member, or other incumbent. A ✓ or ✗ denotes status of any incumbent, win or lose respectively.						
Party	Candidate	Votes	%	±%	Party votes	%	±%
CDU	✓ Sebastian Steineke	36,481	30.8	▼2.5	35,215	29.7	▼6.3
SPD	Dagmar Ziegler	28,061	23.7	▼5.9	24,884	21.0	▼4.2
AfD	Michael Nehls	21,296	18.0		22,183	18.7	▲14.0
Left	Kirsten Tackmann	20,849	17.6	▼6.5	19,447	16.4	▼6.1
FDP	Andreas Hoffmann	4,226	3.6	▲2.3	6,555	5.5	▲3.3
Greens	Martin Vandrey	3,547	3.0	▲0.2	4,231	3.6	▲0.1
PARTEI		1,502	1.3		1,195	1.0	
Tierschutzpartei					1,428	1.2	
FW		1,461	1.2	▲1.1	1,171	1.0	▲0.2
NPD					1,022	0.9	▼1.6
Independent	Bochert	618	0.5				
BGE					366	0.3	
DM					273	0.2	
MLPD		374	0.3		209	0.2	▲0.1
ÖDP					155	0.1	
DKP					74	0.1	
Informal votes		1,813			1,820		
Total valid votes		118,415			118,408		
Turnout		120,228	68.3	▲4.7			
CDU hold	Majority	8,420	7.1	▲3.2			

=== 2013 election ===
Federal election (2013): Prignitz – Ostprignitz-Ruppin – Havelland I
Notes:	Blue background denotes the winner of the electorate vote. Pink background denotes a candidate elected from their party list. Yellow background denotes an electorate win by a list member, or other incumbent. A ✓ or ✗ denotes status of any incumbent, win or lose respectively.						
Party	Candidate	Votes	%	±%	Party votes	%	±%
CDU	Sebastian Steineke	34,115	33.5	▲11.7	37,305	36.5	▲12.8
SPD	✗ Dagmar Ziegler	30,079	29.6	▼2.5	25,638	25.1	▼3.0
Left	Kirsten Tackmann	24,519	24.1	▼6.7	23,048	22.5	▼6.5
AfD					4,761	4.7	
NPD	Peter Börs	2,826	2.8	▼0.4	2,329	2.3	▼0.1
Greens	Kathrin Anke Boleslawsky	2,790	2.7	▼1.5	3,532	3.5	▼0.9
Pirates	Michael Polte	2,633	2.6		1,967	1.9	▲0.2
Independent	Hans-Georg Rieger	1,625	1.6				
Independent	Mathias Krebs	1,531	1.5				
FDP	Jens-Dieter Engelhardt	1,294	1.3	▼6.5	2,299	2.2	▼6.4
FW					772	0.8	
PRO					369	0.4	
Independent	Jonas Kayser	336	0.3				
REP					120	0.1	0.0
MLPD					82	0.1	0.0
Informal votes		2,156			1,682		
Total valid votes		101,748			102,222		
Turnout		103,904	63.9	▲1.0			
CDU gain from SPD	Majority	4,036	3.9				

=== 2009 election ===
Federal election (2009): Prignitz – Ostprignitz-Ruppin – Havelland I
Notes:	Blue background denotes the winner of the electorate vote. Pink background denotes a candidate elected from their party list. Yellow background denotes an electorate win by a list member, or other incumbent. A ✓ or ✗ denotes status of any incumbent, win or lose respectively.						
Party	Candidate	Votes	%	±%	Party votes	%	±%
SPD	Dagmar Ziegler	33,532	32.1	▼6.4	29,446	28.0	▼8.6
Left	Kirsten Tackmann	32,198	30.8	▲5.6	30,550	29.1	▲2.5
CDU	Guido Quadfasel	22,851	21.9	▼1.6	24,913	23.7	▲1.8
FDP	Claus Mohrmann	8,162	7.8	▲3.4	9,068	8.6	▲2.2
Greens	Axel Müller	4,483	4.3	▼1.2	4,587	4.4	▼0.1
NPD	Peter Börs	3,314	3.2	▲0.3	2,494	2.4	▼0.4
Pirates					1,829	1.7	
DVU					875	0.8	
FWD					828	0.8	
REP					170	0.2	
BüSo					153	0.1	
MLPD					84	0.1	▼0.1
Informal votes		3,477			3,020		
Total valid votes		104,540			104,997		
Turnout		108,017	62.9	▼8.7			
SPD hold	Majority	1,334	1.3	▼12.0			

=== 2005 election ===
Federal election (2005):Prignitz – Ostprignitz-Ruppin – Havelland I
Notes:	Blue background denotes the winner of the electorate vote. Pink background denotes a candidate elected from their party list. Yellow background denotes an electorate win by a list member, or other incumbent. A ✓ or ✗ denotes status of any incumbent, win or lose respectively.						
Party	Candidate	Votes	%	±%	Party votes	%	±%
SPD	✓ Ernst Bahr	47,727	38.5	▼9.7	45,385	36.6	▼12.9
Left	Kirsten Tackmann	31,280	25.2	▲8.7	32,966	26.6	▲11.0
CDU	Rainer Neumann	29,092	23.5	▲0.3	27,219	21.9	▼0.7
Greens	Wolfgang Freese	6,809	5.5	▲0.7	5,510	4.4	▲1.0
FDP	Mario Göttling	5,522	4.5	▼0.3	7,941	6.4	▲0.7
NPD	Peter Börs	3,517	2.8	▲0.8	3,400	2.7	▲1.1
GRAUEN					780	0.6	▲0.3
50Plus The Generation-Alliance					591	0.5	
MLPD					227	0.2	
Informal votes		2,336			2,264		
Total valid votes		123,947			124,019		
Turnout		126,283	71.6	▼0.1			
SPD hold	Majority	16,447	13.3				
