= Fest =

Fest or FEST may refer to:

== Arts and entertainment ==
- The Fest, a music festival in Gainesville, Florida, U.S. (since 2002)
- FEST (film festival), Belgrade, Serbia (since 1971)
- Fest Magazine, a Scottish periodical (since 2002)
- Fest, a fictional planet in the Star Wars franchise

== Organizations ==
- FEST (Faculty of Moscow State Forest University) (formed 1959)
- Foreign Emergency Support Team, a U.S. government counterterrorism unit (formed 1986)
- Foundation Exploring Skeletal Dysplasia Together, part of the Skeletal Dysplasias Alliance, U.K.

== People ==
- Joachim Fest (1926–2006), German historian and journalist
- Nicolaus Fest (born 1962), German politician

== See also ==
- Festival (disambiguation)
- Festschrift, a book honoring and presented to someone
- Festuca, a grass genus
