= Festival (disambiguation) =

A festival is a celebratory event, usually centered on a theme.

Festival may also refer to:

== Arts and entertainment ==
=== Film ===
- Festival (1967 film), a documentary about the 1963-1965 Newport Folk Festivals
- Festival (1996 film), a film by South Korean director Im Kwon-taek
- Festival (2001 film), a drama film by Swedish director Karl Johan Larsson
- Festival (2005 film), a comedy about performers at the Edinburgh Festival Fringe
- The Festival (film), a 2018 comedy film set at large UK music festival

=== Literature ===
- Festivals (book), a 1973 collection of festival-related folklore by Ruth Manning-Sanders
- "The Festival" (short story), a story by H. P. Lovecraft

=== Music ===
- Music festival a kind of live music performance and celebration, usually in a large open venue

==== Music companies ====
- Festival Distribution, a Canadian record label and distributor
- Festival Records (1952–2005), an Australian music recording and publishing company
- Festival Records, a record label founded in 1958 by Herb Abramson

==== Albums ====
- Festival (Jon Oliva's Pain album) or the title song, 2006
- Festival (Kenan Doğulu album), 2006
- Festival (Lee Ritenour album), 1988
- Festival (Santana album), 1977

==== Songs ====
- "Festival", a song by Krokus from To You All

=== Television channels and radio stations ===
- Festival (TV channel), a defunct family-friendly HBO premium channel
- EinsFestival, the former name of German television channel One (German TV channel)
- Rádio Festival, a defunct radio station in Porto, Portugal

=== Television shows ===
- Festival (British TV series), a 1960s dramatic anthology series
- Festival (Canadian TV series), a 1960s entertainment anthology series

=== Other arts and entertainment ===
- The Festival, an 18th-century masque
- DDR Festival Dance Dance Revolution, a 2004 Dance Dance Revolution video game

== Other uses ==
- Aerostar R40S Festival, a Romanian light-sport aircraft
- Christian festival, a major event in the Liturgical year of Christian churches, such as Christmas and Easter
  - Festival (Anglicanism), a type of observance day
- Festival (food), a type of deep-fried bread in Jamaican cuisine
- Festival Speech Synthesis System, a general multi-lingual speech synthesis system

== See also ==
- List of festivals
- MV Festivity, an Empire F type coaster in service with F T Everard & Sons Ltd, 1946-61
