= Sebastian Steineke =

German politician

Sebastian Steineke MdB
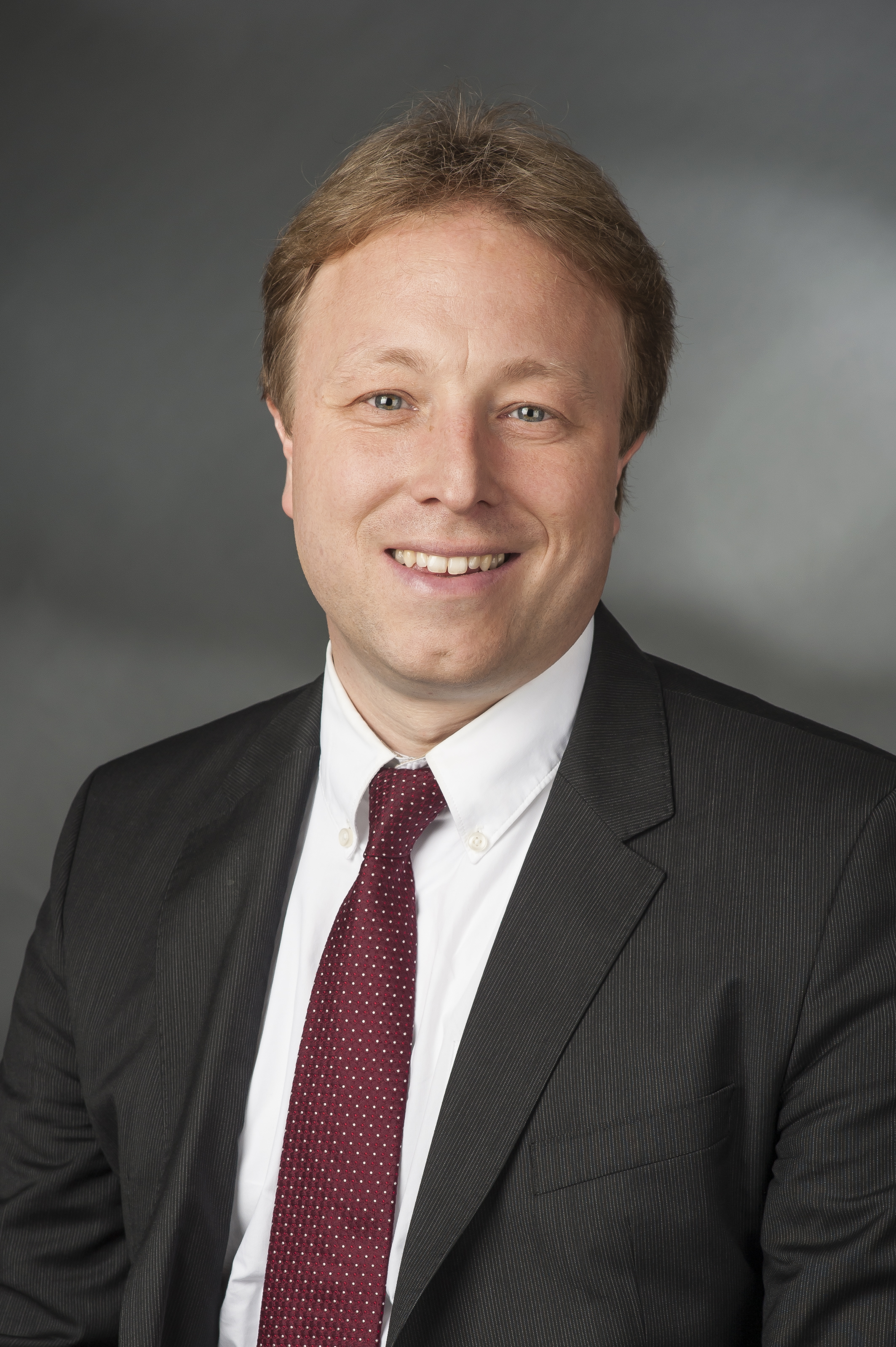
- Steineke in 2014

Member of the Bundestag; from Brandenburg
- Incumbent
- Assumed office 25 March 2025
- Constituency: State list
- In office 22 October 2013 – 26 October 2021
- Preceded by: Dagmar Ziegler
- Succeeded by: Wiebke Papenbrock
- Constituency: Prignitz – Ostprignitz-Ruppin – Havelland I

Personal details
- Born: 19 June 1973 (age 53) Hamburg, West Germany
- Party: Christian Democratic Union
- Children: 2
- Education: University of Hamburg
- Occupation: Lawyer

Sebastian Steineke (born 19 June 1973) is a German lawyer and politician of the Christian Democratic Union (CDU) who served as a member of the Bundestag from the state of Brandenburg from 2013 to 2021.

== Political career ==
Steineke first became a member of the Bundestag after the 2013 German federal election, representing the Prignitz – Ostprignitz-Ruppin – Havelland I district. In parliament, he served on the Committee on Legal Affairs and Consumer Protection.

For the 2021 national elections, Steineke endorsed Markus Söder as the Christian Democrats' joint candidate to succeed Chancellor Angela Merkel.

He lost his seat in the 2021 German federal election.
