= Gerhard Gleich =

Gerhard Gleich (born 23 October 1941 in Prague) is an artist and professor emeritus of the Academy of Fine Arts Vienna in Vienna, Austria.

He grew up as Gerhard Feest and later adopted the name of his second wife, the Polish-Austrian painter Joanna Gleich. A student of Albert Paris Gütersloh, he was from 1972 to 1997 an assistant of the Viennese painter and art professor Wolfgang Hollegha. Today he works in the academy's Institute for Conceptual Art with Professor Marina Grzinic.

He is the brother of Christian Feest and Johannes Feest.

== Literature ==
- Rüdiger Engerth, Über Paul Rotterdam und Gerhard Feest, in: Forum (Vienna) Nr. 160, pp. 365 seq.
