= Dagmar Ziegler =

German politician (born 1960)

- Ziegler in 2020

Vice President of the Bundestag (on proposal of the SPD-faction)
- In office 26 November 2020 – 26 October 2021
- President: Wolfgang Schäuble
- Preceded by: Thomas Oppermann
- Succeeded by: Aydan Özoğuz

Member of the Bundestag; from Brandenburg
- In office 27 October 2009 – 26 October 2021
- Preceded by: Ernst Bahr
- Succeeded by: Multi-member district
- Constituency: Prignitz – Ostprignitz-Ruppin – Havelland I (2009–2013); State list (2013–2021)

Minister for Labour, Social Affairs, Health and Family of Brandenburg
- In office 13 October 2004 – 6 November 2009
- Minister-President: Matthias Platzeck
- Preceded by: Günter Baaske
- Succeeded by: Günter Baaske

Minister of Finance of Brandenburg
- In office 19 September 2000 – 19 September 2004
- Minister-President: Manfred Stolpe; Matthias Platzeck
- Preceded by: Wilma Simon
- Succeeded by: Rainer Speer

Member of the Landtag of Brandenburg; for Prignitz I
- In office 11 October 1994 – 21 October 2009
- Preceded by: Constituency established
- Succeeded by: Holger Rupprecht

Personal details
- Born: 28 September 1960 (age 65) Leipzig, East Germany
- Party: Social Democratic
- Children: 2
- Education: Humboldt University of Berlin

Dagmar Ziegler (born 28 September 1960) is a German politician of the Social Democratic Party (SPD) who served as a member of the Bundestag from the state of Brandenburg from 2009 until 2021.

== Political career ==
=== Career in state politics ===
From 1994 until 2009, Ziegler was a member of the State Parliament of Brandenburg. In the government of Minister-President Matthias Platzeck, she served as State Minister of Finance (2000-2004) and State Minister for Labour, Social Affairs, Health and Families (2004-2009).

=== Member of the German Parliament (2009–2021) ===
Ziegler became a member of the Bundestag after the 2009 German federal election. From 2009 until 2013, she was Member of the Bundestag FOR Prignitz – Ostprignitz-Ruppin – Havelland I in north-western Brandenburg State, and served as deputy chairwoman of the SPD parliamentary group under the leadership of chairman Frank-Walter Steinmeier.

She lost her constituency in 2013 to Sebastian Steineke from the CDU, but was elected on the state list.

In the negotiations to form a Grand Coalition of Chancellor Angela Merkel's Christian Democrats (CDU together with the Bavarian CSU) and the SPD following the 2013 federal elections, Ziegler was part of her party's delegation in the working group on families, women and equality, led by Annette Widmann-Mauz and Manuela Schwesig.

From 2014, Ziegler served on the parliament’s Council of Elders, which – among other duties – determines daily legislative agenda items and assigns committee chairpersons based on party representation. In 2018, she also joined the Committee on Economic Cooperation and Development.

Ziegler contested the same constituency in 2017, but failed. She returned to the Bundestag on the list.

In December 2019, Ziegler announced that she would not stand in the 2021 federal elections but instead resign from active politics by the end of the parliamentary term. In her final year in parliament, she serves as the parliament's vice-president, following the sudden death of Thomas Oppermann.

== Other activities ==
- Deutsche Gesellschaft für Internationale Zusammenarbeit (GIZ), Member of the Board of Trustees
