= Alexander Bertram (German politician) =

German politician (born 1988)

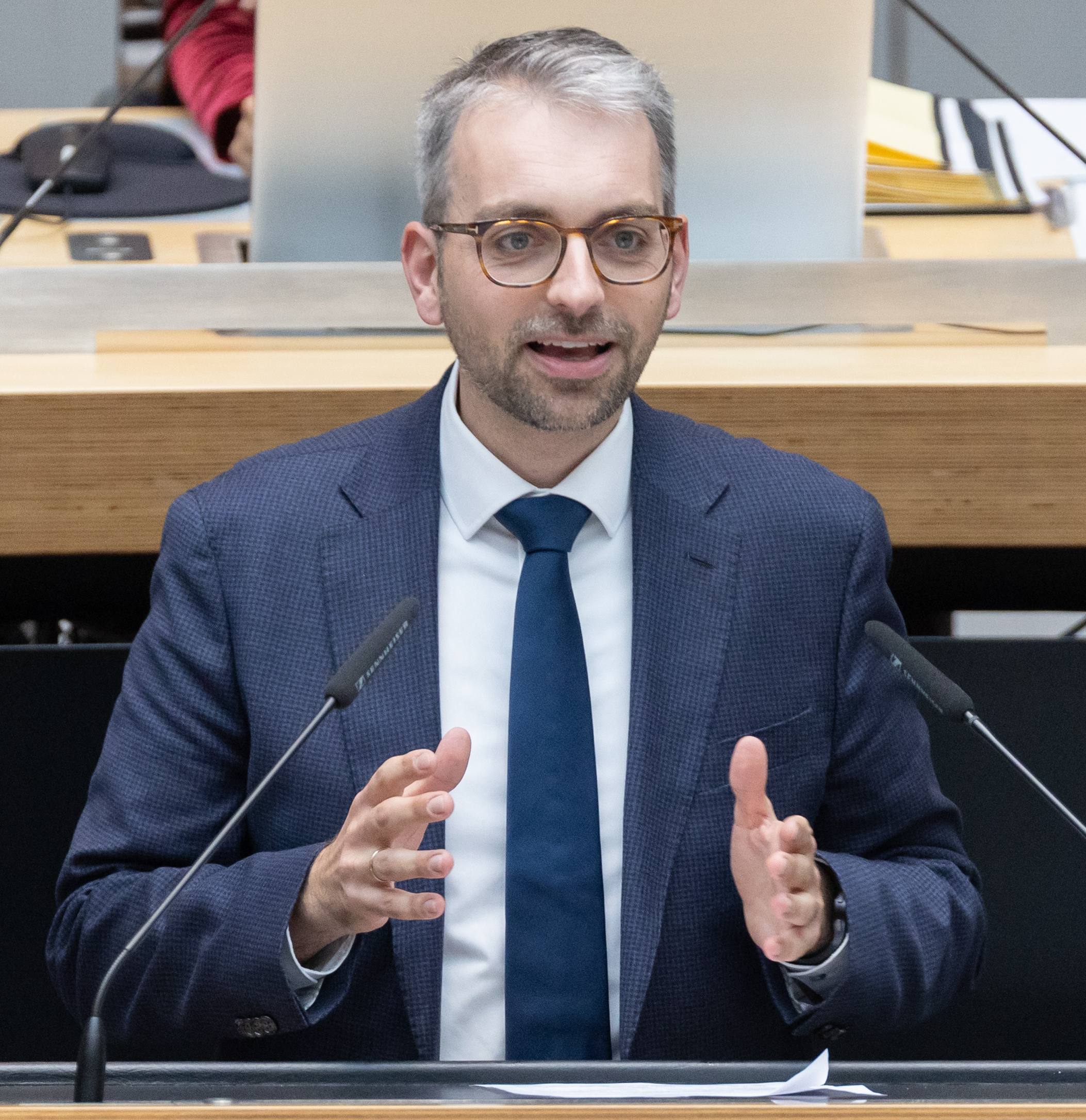
- Bertram in 2025

Member of the Abgeordnetenhaus of Berlin
- Incumbent
- Assumed office 16 March 2023

Personal details
- Born: 1988 (age 37–38) Braunschweig
- Party: Alternative for Germany

Alexander Bertram (born 1988 in Braunschweig) is a German politician serving as a member of the Abgeordnetenhaus of Berlin since 2023. He is a deputy leader of the AfD Berlin.
