= Nicolaus Fest =

German politician and former journalist (born 1962)

Nicolaus Fest MEP
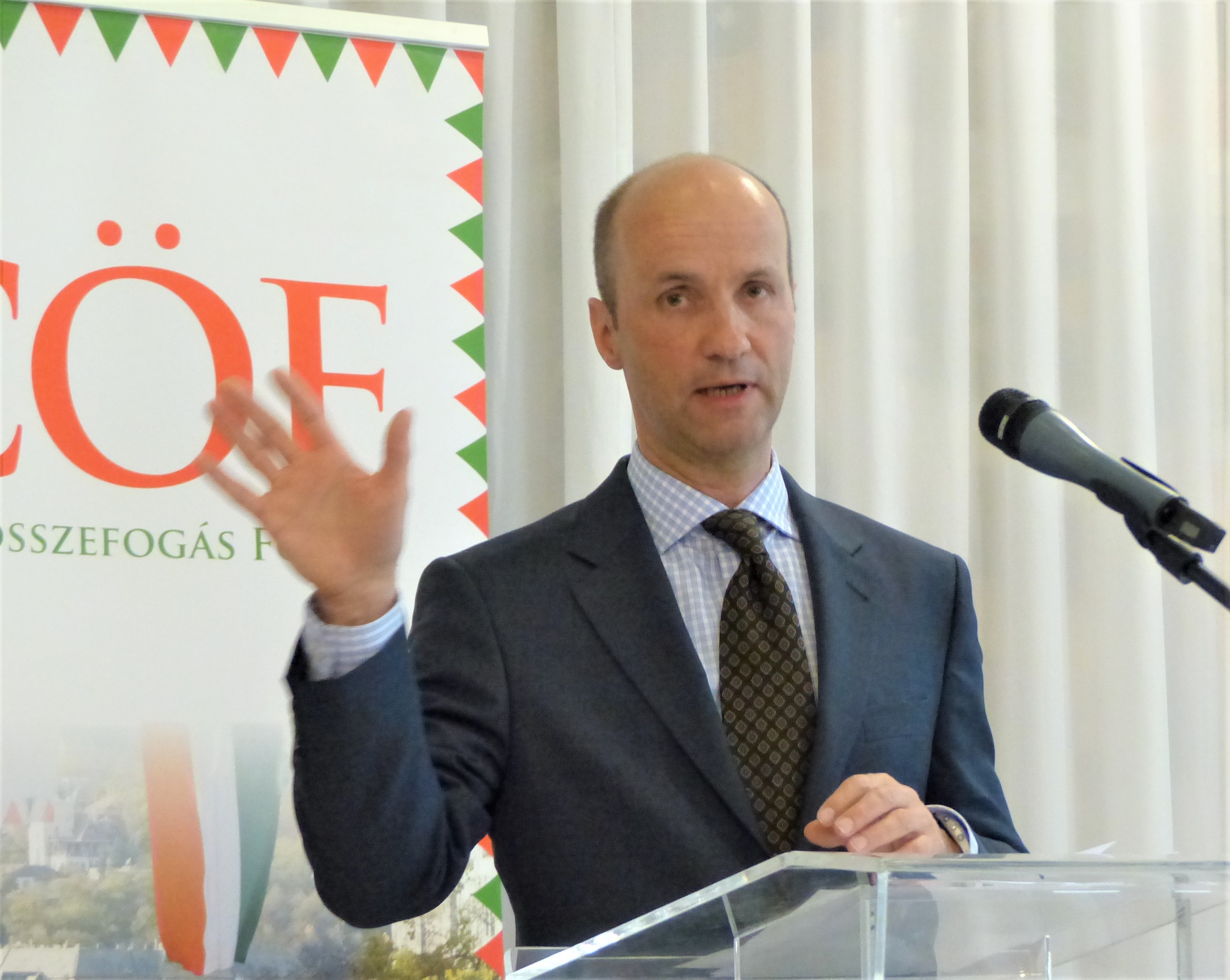

Member of the European Parliament for Germany
- Incumbent
- Assumed office 2 July 2019

Personal details
- Born: 1 July 1962 (age 63) Hamburg, West Germany (now Germany)
- Party: Alternative for Germany

Constantin Nicolaus Johannes Joachim Fest (born 1 July 1962) is a German politician (Alternative for Germany) and former journalist, who is serving as a Member of the European Parliament.

== Life ==
Fest was deputy editor-in-chief of Bild am Sonntag of Springer SE. In 2014 he wrote a comment in which he called Islam an "obstacle to integration". Colleagues distanced themselves, the press council issued a reprimand and Fest left Springer Verlag. In 2016 he joined the AfD Berlin and stated he wanted to join the Bundestag some day.

In 2019 he was elected as a member of the European Parliament.

== Controversies ==
After the death of the president of the European Parliament David Sassoli in 2022, Fest wrote: "Finally this bastard is gone" in a WhatsApp group of AfD MoP.
