= Festivals (book) =

- Author: Ruth Manning-Sanders (editor)
- Illustrator: Raymond Briggs
- Cover artist: Raymond Briggs
- Language: English
- Genre: Folklore
- Publisher: E. P. Dutton
- Publication date: 1973
- Publication place: United States
- Media type: Print (hardcover)
- Pages: 188 pp

Festivals is a 1973 anthology of festival-related folklore from around the world compiled by Ruth Manning-Sanders. According to the book's dust jacket, "This potpourri of festivals reveals fascinating customs and celebrations from many countries of the world. Each special day is preceded by background material on the origins of the holiday."

Some of the special days covered are (using Manning-Sanders' words and spellings): New Year's Day, Saint Bride's Day, the Japanese Snow Festival, Saint Valentine's Day, Saint Patrick's Day, Shrove Tuesday, Mardi Gras, Easter Day, All Fools' Day, the Bright Weather Festival, Saint George's Day, May Day, the Padstow Hobby Horse, Independence Day, Michaelmas Day, Saint Crispin's Day, Hallow E'en, the Fifth of November, Hogmanay, and Christmas.

For many of the festivals, the book includes writings of some famous authors or historical personalities. Among those included in the book are Robert Herrick, Fiona Macleod, Marco Polo, John Donne, Sir Charles Lyall, Norman Hunter, Chiang Yee, Flora Thompson, Laurie Lee, Laura Ingalls Wilder, Dylan Thomas, William Shakespeare, Richard Cobbold, P. L. Travers, Oliver Herford, Alison Uttley, Richard Crashaw, Jon and Rumer Godden, and Alfred Tennyson.
