= Kirsten Tackmann =

German politician

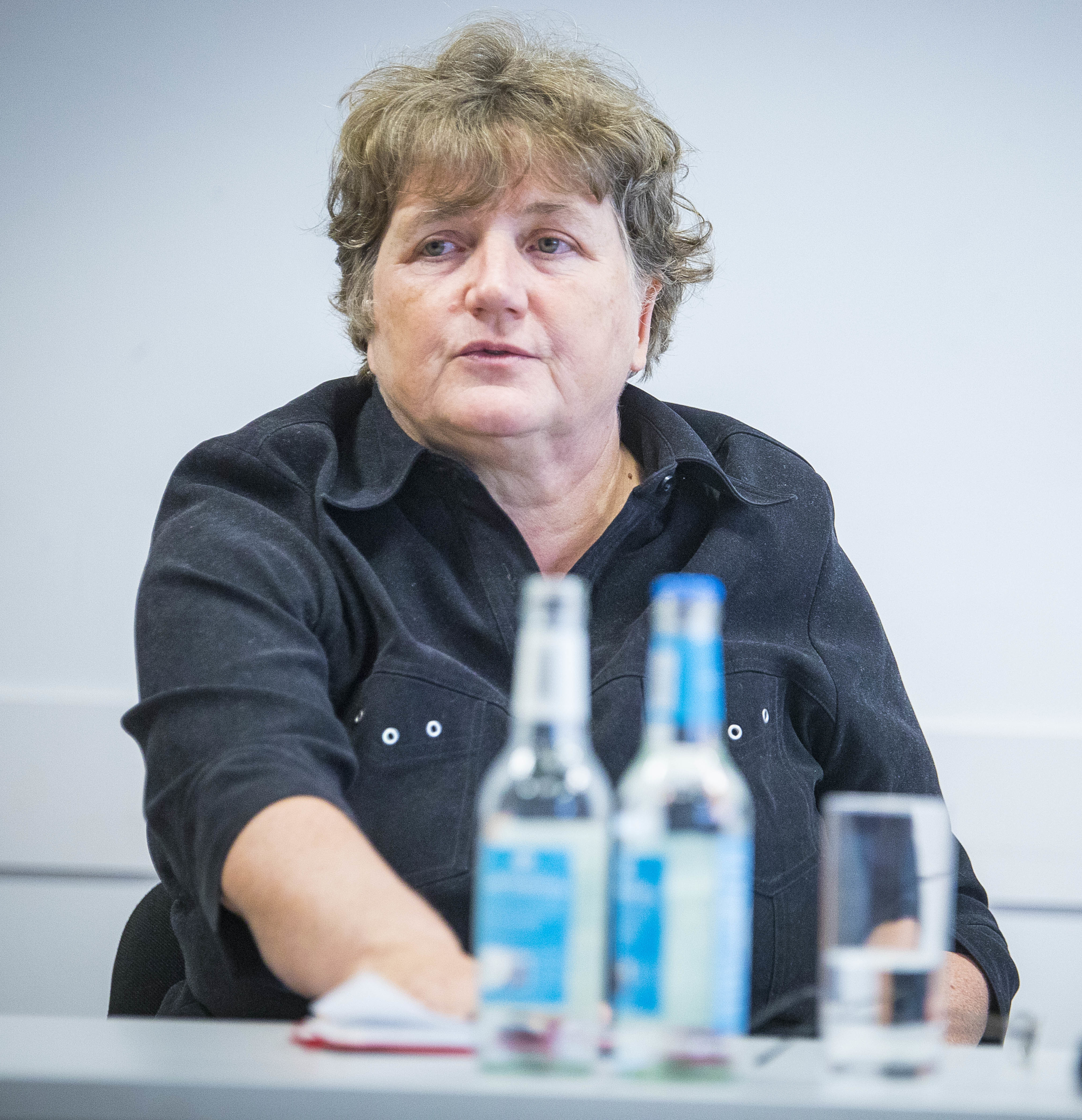
- Kirsten Tackmann in 2018

Member of the Bundestag
- Incumbent
- Assumed office 2005

Personal details
- Born: 24 September 1960 (age 65) Schmalkalden, West Germany (now Germany)
- Party: The Left
- Children: 2

Kirsten Tackmann (born 24 September 1960) is a German politician. Born in Schmalkalden, Thuringia, she represents The Left. Kirsten Tackmann has served as a member of the Bundestag from the state of Brandenburg since 2005.

== Life ==
After attending the POS Georg Schumann in Berlin-Lichtenberg, Kirsten Tackmann completed an apprenticeship as a chemical laboratory assistant with A-levels at VEB Berlin-Chemie from 1977 to 1980. She then began studying veterinary medicine at the Humboldt University of Berlin, which she completed in 1986 with a license to practice veterinary medicine. Kirsten Tackmann then became a research assistant at the State Institute for Epizootiology and Epizootic Disease Research, where she remains employed by its successor, the Federal Research Institute for Animal Viral Diseases. In 1993, she received her doctorate (Dr. med. vet.) from the Humboldt University of Berlin with a thesis on the immune response to Cysticercus bovis infestation under experimental and natural pathogen exposure with special emphasis on serological diagnostics using ELISA. She became a member of the Bundestag after the 2005 German federal election. She is a member of the Committee for Food and Agriculture. In June 2020, Tackmann announced that she would not stand in the 2021 German federal election.
