= Christian Feest =

Austrian ethnologist and ethnohistorian

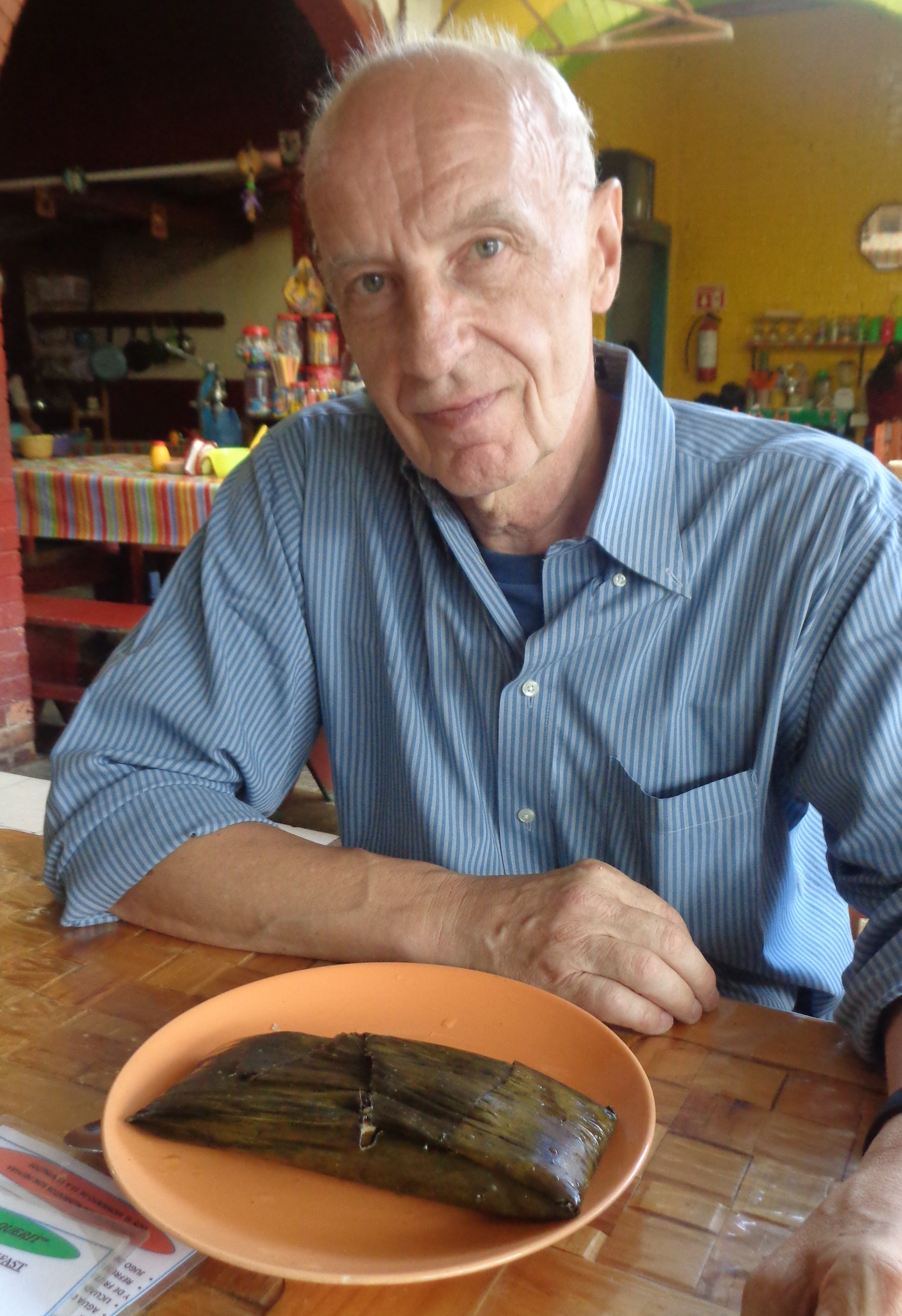
Christian Feest (2015) in San Cristobal de las Casas, Mexico

Christian Feest (born July 20, 1945) is an Austrian ethnologist and ethnohistorian.

== Biography ==
Feest was born on July 20, 1945, in Broumov. He specializes in the Native Americans of eastern North America and the Northeastern United States and their material culture, ethnological image research and Native American anthropology of art. He is widely acknowledged for his pioneering research and publications on the early European-Native American colonial contact period, and on the history of museum collections.

Feest studied ethnology and linguistics at the University of Vienna in the 1960s. He started publishing articles in 1964. His 1969 dissertation was titled, "Virginia Algonkian 1570-1703: Ethnohistorie und historische Ethnographic" ("Ethnohistory and Historical Ethnography of the Virginia Algonquian 1570-1703").

From 1963 to 1993, he worked at the Museum für Völkerkunde (Museum of Ethnology) in Vienna, mainly as curator of the North and Central American collections and director of the photo archive. From 1975 he taught anthropology at the University of Vienna and was habilitated in 1980 with a thesis on "Indian alcohol use in North America". Feest was professor of the ethnology of indigenous America at the Frobenius Institute at the Johann Wolfgang Goethe University of Frankfurt am Main from 1993 to 2004. From 2004 to 2010, he returned to the Museum of Ethnology, Vienna as director. In 1972–3, he served as a post-doctoral fellow at the Smithsonian Institution in Washington DC, and, in 1987-8, as a Ford Foundation Fellow at the Newberry Library in Chicago.

In 2026 Christian Feest featured prominently in an article on science.orf dealing with German language terminology in use to refer to Native Americans as well as with unwanted terminology disputes across countries ('first nations') and/or in specific linguistic traditions.

Feest has two prominent brothers, Gerhard Gleich and Johannes Feest. Christian Feest was the editor of the European Review of Native American Studies.

== Publications (selected) ==
Some of Feest's publications:

- Anders, Ferdinand; Pfister-Burkhalter, Margarete; Feest, Christian F., eds. (1967). Lukas Vischer (1780-1840): Künstler, Reisender, Sammler: Ein Beitrag zur Ethnographie der Vereinigten Staaten von Amerika sowie zur Archäologie und Volkskunde Mexikos. Völkerkündliche Abhandlungen. Vol. 2. Hannover: Kommissionsverlag Münstermann-Druck.
- Feest, Christian F. (1968). "Lukas Vischers Beiträge zur Ethnographie Nordamerikas". Archiv für Völkerkunde. 22: 31–66.
- —— (1974). "Creek Towns in 1725". Ethnologische Zeitschrift. 1. Zürich: 161–175. OCLC 1098084.
- —— (1974). "Notes on Saponi Settlements in Virginia Prior to 1714". Quarterly Bulletin of the Archeological Society of Virginia. 28 (3): 152–155. ISBN 9780313273322. OCLC 2444919.
- —— (1976). Das rote Amerika. Nordamerikas Indianer. Wien: Europaverlag. ISBN 9783203505770. OCLC 3414983.
- —— (1978). "Virginia Algonquians". In Trigger, Bruce G. (ed.). Handbook of North American Indians, Vol. 15: Northeast. Washington, DC: Smithsonian Institution. pp. 253–270. OCLC 12682465.
- —— (1978). "North Carolina Algonquians". In Trigger, Bruce G. (ed.). Handbook of North American Indians, Vol. 15: Northeast. Washington, DC: Smithsonian Institution. pp. 270–281. OCLC 12682465.
- —— (1980). The Art of War. New York: Thames and Hudson. ISBN 0-500-06010-X. OCLC 7094849.
- —— (1981). "Notes on Native American Alcohol Use". In Hovens, Pieter T. (ed.). North American Indian Studies, European Contributions. Göttingen: Edition Herodot. pp. 201–222.
- —— (1986). Indians of Northeastern North America. Leiden: E.J. Brill. ISBN 90-04-07833-9. OCLC 15862409.
- ——, ed. (1987). Indians and Europe. An Interdisciplinary Collection of Essays. Aachen: Rader Verlag / Edition Herodot. ISBN 3-89399-020-8.
- —— (1990). The Powhatan Tribes. New York: Chelsea House. ISBN 0-7910-0395-7. OCLC 19777432.
- —— (1992). Native Arts of North America (Rev. ed.). New York: Thames and Hudson. ISBN 0-500-20262-1. OCLC 27038276.
- ——; Sylvia S. Kasprycki (1998). Peoples of the Twilight: European Views on Native Minnesota, 1823 to 1862. Afton, Minn.: Afton Historical Society Press. ISBN 1-890434-06-X.
- —— (1995). "The Collecting of American Indian Artifacts in Europe, 1493-1750". In Kupperman, Karen (ed.). America in European Consciousness, 1493- 1750. Williamsburg, Va.: University of North Carolina Press. pp. 324–360. ISBN 0-8078-4510-8.
- ——; Alfred Janata (1999). Technologie und Ergologie in der Völkerkunde Nordamerikas (4 ed.). Berlin: D. Reimer. ISBN 9783496026549. OCLC 42435638.
- ——; C. Ronald Corum (2017). Frederick Weygold. Artist and Ethnographer of North American Indians. Altenstadt: ZKF Publishers. ISBN 978-39818412-0-6.
- —— (2000). The Cultures of Native North Americans. Köln: Könemann. ISBN 978-38290-2985-8.
- ——; Karl-Heinz Kohl (2001). Hauptwerke der Ethnologie. Kröners Taschenausgabe, Bd. 380. Stuttgart: A. Kröner. ISBN 3-520-38001-3. OCLC 52750273.

== Editor ==
- European Review of Native American Studies, since 1987

== Festschrift ==
- Ding, Bild, Wissen. Ergebnisse und Perspektiven nordamerikanischer Forschung in Frankfurt am Main, Cora Bender et al., eds, Cologne: Rüdige Köppe, 2005 (with a Feest bibliography).
