= Ernst Bahr =

German politician

Member of the Bundestag
- In office 10 November 1994 – 27 October 2009
- Preceded by: Rosemarie Priebus
- Succeeded by: Dagmar Ziegler
- Constituency: Neuruppin – Kyritz – Wittstock – Pritzwalk – Perleberg (1994–2002); Prignitz – Ostprignitz-Ruppin – Havelland I (2002–2009)

Personal details
- Born: 11 June 1945 (age 81) Chlum, Czechoslovakia
- Party: Social Democratic
- Other political affiliations: SDP in the GDR (1989–1990)
- Children: 3
- Education: University of Potsdam

Ernst Bahr (German pronunciation: [ɛʁnst ˈbaːɐ̯]; born 11 June 1945) is a German politician and member of the Social Democratic Party of Germany. He was born in Czechoslovakia at the end of the Second World War.

== Early life and education ==
After graduation in 1964 in Rheinberg Bahr completed a degree in mathematics and astronomy at the University of Potsdam. In 1968, he ended his career there as a graduate teacher. Until 1989 he was a teacher, first in Linum and later in Fehrbellin.

== Political career ==
In 1989, Bahr was one of the founding members of the Social Democratic Party in the GDR in Neuruppin. From 1990 to 2005 he was chairman of the SPD subdistrict Ostprignitz-Ruppin and 1992-1994 deputy chairman of the SPD in Brandenburg.

From 1990 to 1996, Bahr was on the city council for Neuruppin and 1993 the county Ostprignitz-Ruppin. From 1994 to 2009, he was member of the German Bundestag. From 1998 to 2002, he served as the speaker of the National Group of Brandenburg and the eastern German deputies in the SPD parliamentary group.

In 1994 and 1998, Bahr was the representative of Neuruppin-Kyritz-Wittstock-Pritzwalk-Perleberg. Since 2002 he has represented Prignitz-Ostprignitz-Ruppin-Havelland I in the Bundestag. In the Bundestag election of 2005 he recorded 38.5% of the primary vote.

In the election of 16 January 2005 Bahr was the SPD candidate for the office of Mayor of Neuruppin. In the first round he barely missed an absolute majority with a vote share of 49.80%. In the run-off election of 6 February 2005, he lost, surprisingly, against Jens-Peter Golde who united 50.26% of the vote.

In the federal elections of 2009, he did not run for the German Bundestag. He was succeeded by the current vice-chairman of the SPD, Dagmar Ziegler.

== Other activities ==
Bahr was District Administrator of District Neuruppin from 1990 to 1993.

== Personal life ==
Bahr is divorced and has three sons.
