= German Taxpayers Federation =

German taxpayer association

Bund der Steuerzahler Deutschland e.V.
- BdSt
- Bund der Steuerzahler Deutschland e.V.
- Established: 1949
- Founded at: Stuttgart, Baden-Württemberg, Germany
- Type: Organisation
- Legal status: Eingetragener Verein (e. V.)
- Purpose: Political lobbying; PR and policy work on fiscal and tax policy
- Headquarters: Berlin, Germany
- Official language: German
- President: Reiner Holznagel

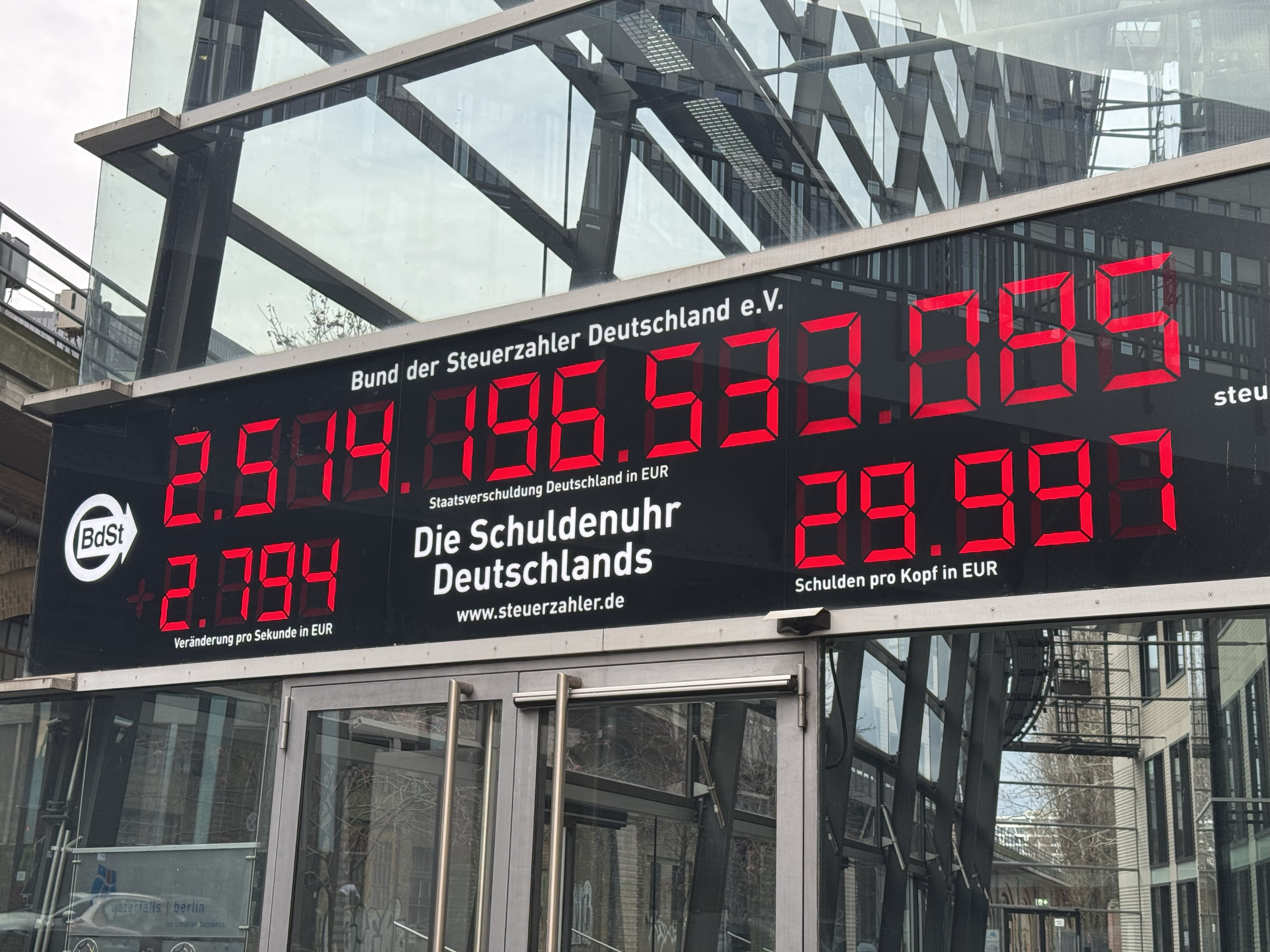
The debt clock displays federal government debt in Germany.

The German Taxpayers Federation (German: Bund der Steuerzahler Deutschland e.V. (BdSt)) is a membership based organization conducting interest representation (political lobbying) as well as policy work in the field of fiscal and tax policy. The organization is not affiliated with any political party. The BdSt is one of the most traditional lobbying organizations in German federal politics.

== History ==
BdSt was established in 1949 by Karl Bräuer and others in Stuttgart. It is known for striking actions such as the "National Debt Clock" installed in Berlin's government district and the "Taxpayers Memorial Day".

== Purpose ==
BdSt aims to lower taxation and public spending for public service, as well as the reduce bureaucracy and public debt. Political demands include minimal government and low tax rates for corporations, shareholders and wealthy tax payers.

== Representation ==
The BdSt presents itself as a representative of the citizens, but is in fact not a representative image of the tax-paying population in Germany: Around 60% of its members are entrepreneurs and companies, another 15% are freelancers.

The BdSt sued against the federal solidarity surcharge (Solidaritätszuschlag). In 2021, only top earners (corporations and shareholders) will pay this. The full rate of 5.5 percent applies to corporate profits of corporations, to share profits and to income from around €110,000 gross. 90 percent of income tax payers in Germany no longer pay the Solidaritätszuschlag at all.

== Cooperation ==
For many years, the BdSt has cooperated closely with Hamburg-Mannheimer insurance company (Ergo group) in the area of member recruitment. At Hamburg-Mannheimer there are representatives who are exclusively responsible for recruiting members for BdSt and at the same time use this to recruit new customers for the insurance company.

== Personnel ==
The chairman of the BdSt, Reiner Holznagel, was a public relations officer for the Mecklenburg-Western Pomerania CDU before his involvement with the organization.

AfD politician Kristin Brinker was head of BdSt Berlin from 2012 to 2016 before founding the Berlin the far-right state organization Alternative for Germany. Rainer Brüderle, FDP politician and former federal minister, is president of BdSt Rhineland-Palatinate. Rolf Baron Vielhauer von Hohenhau, a CSU politician, has been president of BdSt Bavaria since 1983.

== Non-profit status ==
A legal report concluded in 2023 that the organization itself is not a non-profit organization. The report was commissioned by Campact, which wanted to initiate a new debate about non-profit law.

== Reception ==
Journalist Friedrich Küppersbusch argued in 2021: "The Taxpayers' Association is a lobby made up of the Union and the FDP that wants to implement tax cuts for its members, the majority of whom are very wealthy. It works with fake news, with number tricks, with surreptitious advertising and with contempt for the "stupid, stupid state"."
