= Johannes Feest =

German penologist and sociologist of law

Johannes Feest (born 21 November 1939 in Berlin) is a German penologist and sociologist of law. He studied law in Vienna (Austria) and Munich (Germany) and sociology at the University of California, Berkeley. From 1974 until his retirement in 2005 he was professor of criminal law at the University of Bremen (Germany). From 1995 to 1997 he directed the International Institute for the Sociology of Law in Oñati. He has done research on the courts, police and prisons. Presently, he is primarily engaged with German prison policy. In 2019, he initiated a manifesto to abolish penitentiaries and other prisons. He is the brother of Christian Feest and Gerhard Gleich.

== Selected publications ==
- (1972) Die Definitionsmacht der Polizei. Strategien der Strafverfolgung und soziale Selektion (with Erhard Blankenburg). Düsseldorf: Bertelsmann Universitätsverlag.
- (1997) Totale Institution und Rechtsschutz. Eine Untersuchung zum Rechtsschutz im Strafvollzug (with Wolfgang Lesting and Peter Selling). Opladen: Westdeutscher Verlag.
- (2001) Adapting Legal Cultures (edited with David Nelken). Oxford: Hart Publishing.
- (2005) Sven Burkhardt/Christine Graebsch/Helmut Pollähne (Eds.), Korrespondenzen in Sachen: Strafvollzug, Rechtskulturen, Kriminalpolitik, Menschenrechte. Ein Lese-Theater als Feestschrift.Münster: Lit Verlag.
- (2018) Against Penitentiaries. In: Pavarini/Ferrari (eds.) No Prison. Capel Delvi: European Group Press.
- (2020) Definitionsmacht, Renitenz, Abolitionismus. Texte rund um das Strafvollzugsarchiv. Springer: Wiesbaden.
- (2022) Kommentar zum Strafvollzugsgesetz, 8th edition. Heymann: Köln.
