= Georg Pazderski =

German politician (born 1951)

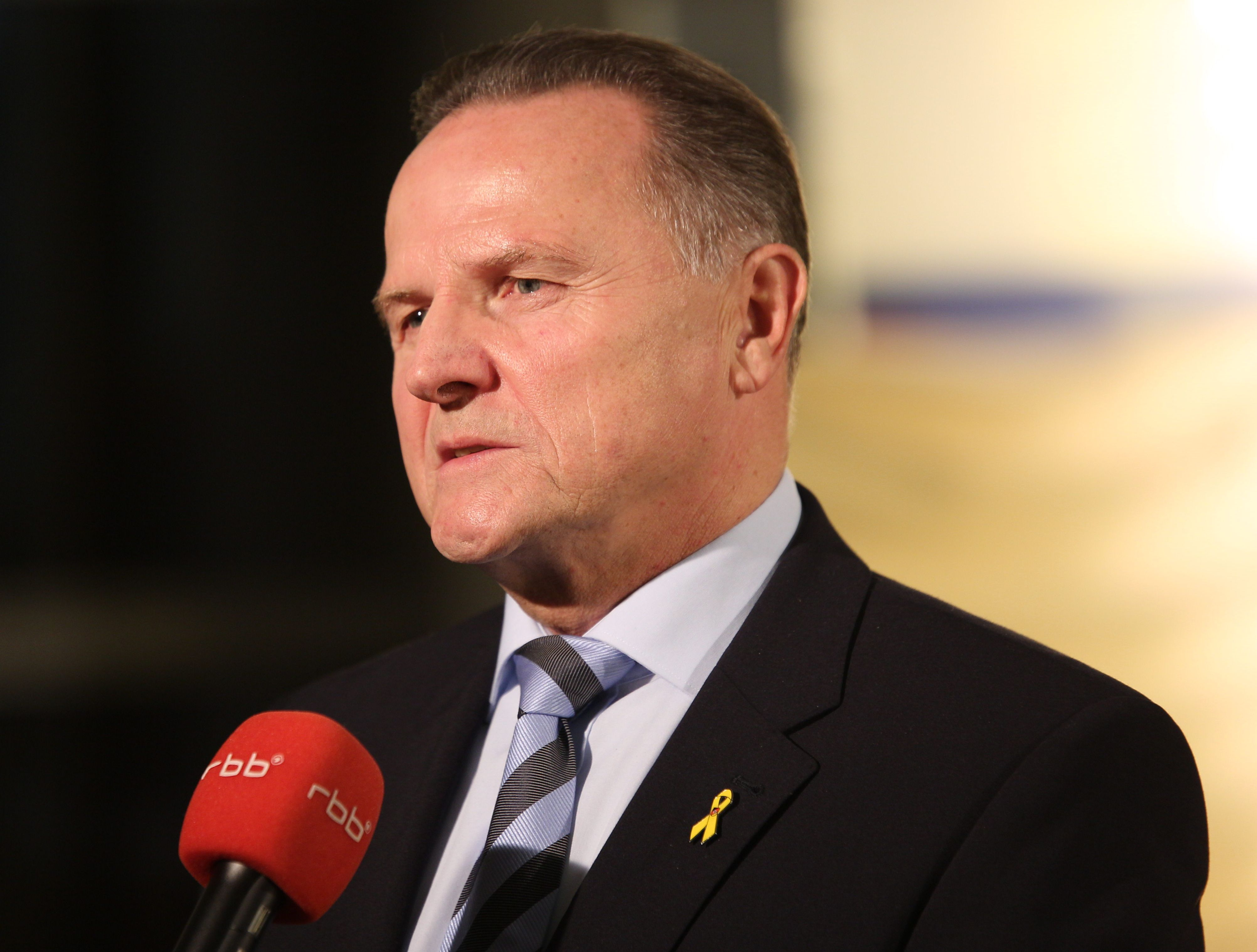
Pazderski

Georg Pazderski (born 6 October 1951) is a retired German military officer and politician for the Alternative for Germany (AfD) party.

== Biography ==
Pazderski was born 1951 in the West German city of Pirmasens to a German mother and a Polish father, former forced laborer. He served in the Bundeswehr, retiring as a colonel.

From 2017 to 2019 he was one of the deputy leaders of right-wing party Alternative for Germany and, from 2017 to 2021, state chairman in Berlin.

Pazderski's candidacies in the 2017 and 2021 German federal election both failed.

Pazderski has been the subject of several controversies. In 2018, a Jewish organisation excluded him from participating in a ceremony in memory of the victims Kristallnacht, citing his party's antisemitism. In 2016, a court forced him to retract false claims that the German government had sponsored Hillary Clinton's presidential campaign. Vulgar comments regarding a female politician's looks prompted accusations of sexism in 2021.
