= Götz Frömming =

German politician (born 1968)

Götz Frömming MdB
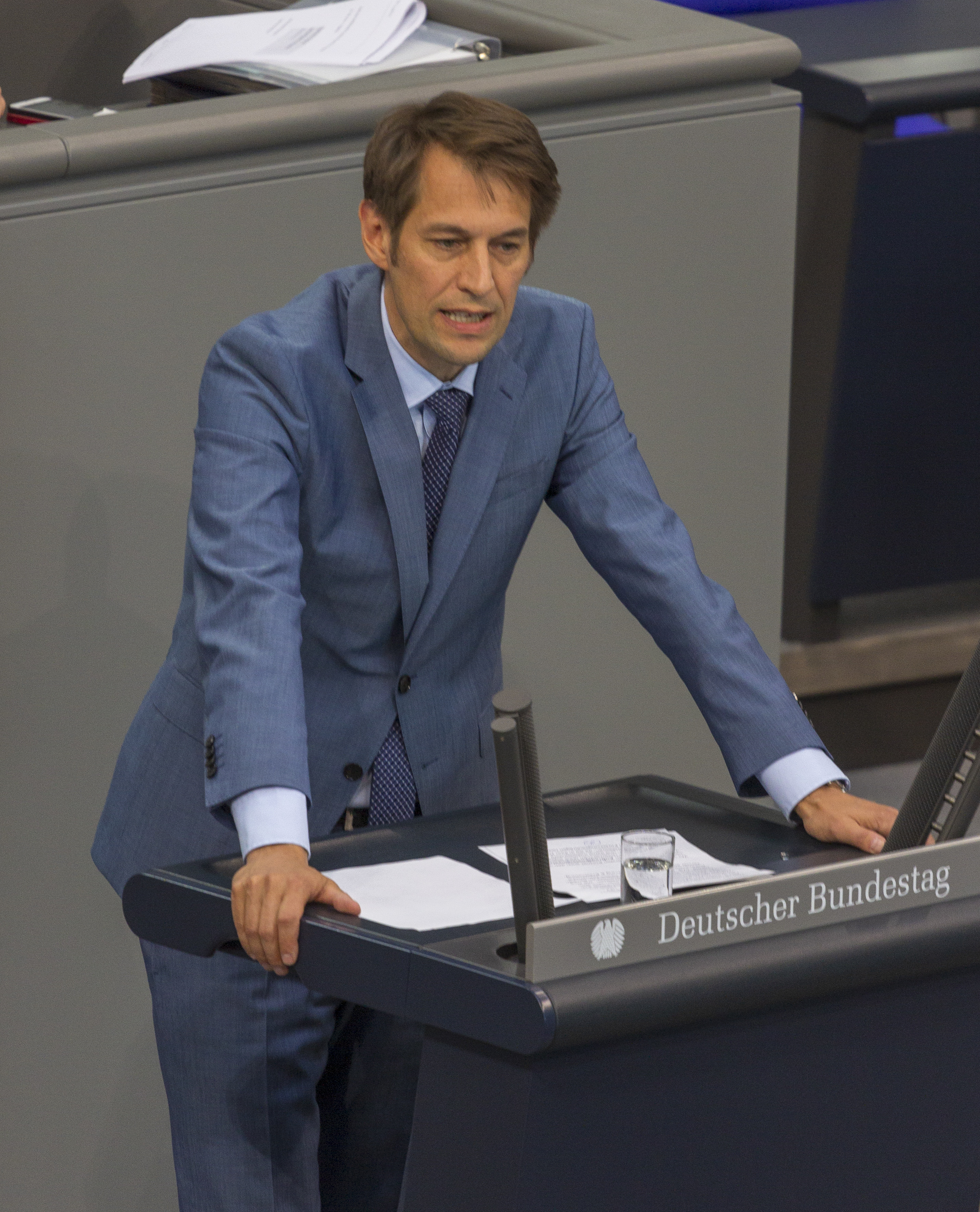
- Frömming in 2019

Member of the Bundestag
- Incumbent
- Assumed office 24 October 2017
- Constituency: Berlin state list (2017–2025); Prignitz – Ostprignitz-Ruppin – Havelland I (2025–present)

Personal details
- Born: 30 August 1968 (age 58) Eutin, West Germany
- Party: Alternative for Germany (since 2013)
- Other political affiliations: Free Voters (2012–2013)
- Children: 3
- Education: Goethe University Frankfurt; Humboldt University of Berlin; Karlsruhe Institute of Technology

Götz Frömming (born 30 August 1968) is a German teacher and politician. Born in Eutin, Schleswig-Holstein, he represents Alternative for Germany (AfD). Götz Frömming has served as a member of the Bundestag from the state of Berlin since 2017.

== Life ==
He was married and has three children. He became member of the Bundestag after the 2017 German federal election. He is a member of the Committee for Education, Research and Technology Assessment.
