= Paul Rotterdam =

Austrian-born American painter (born 1939)

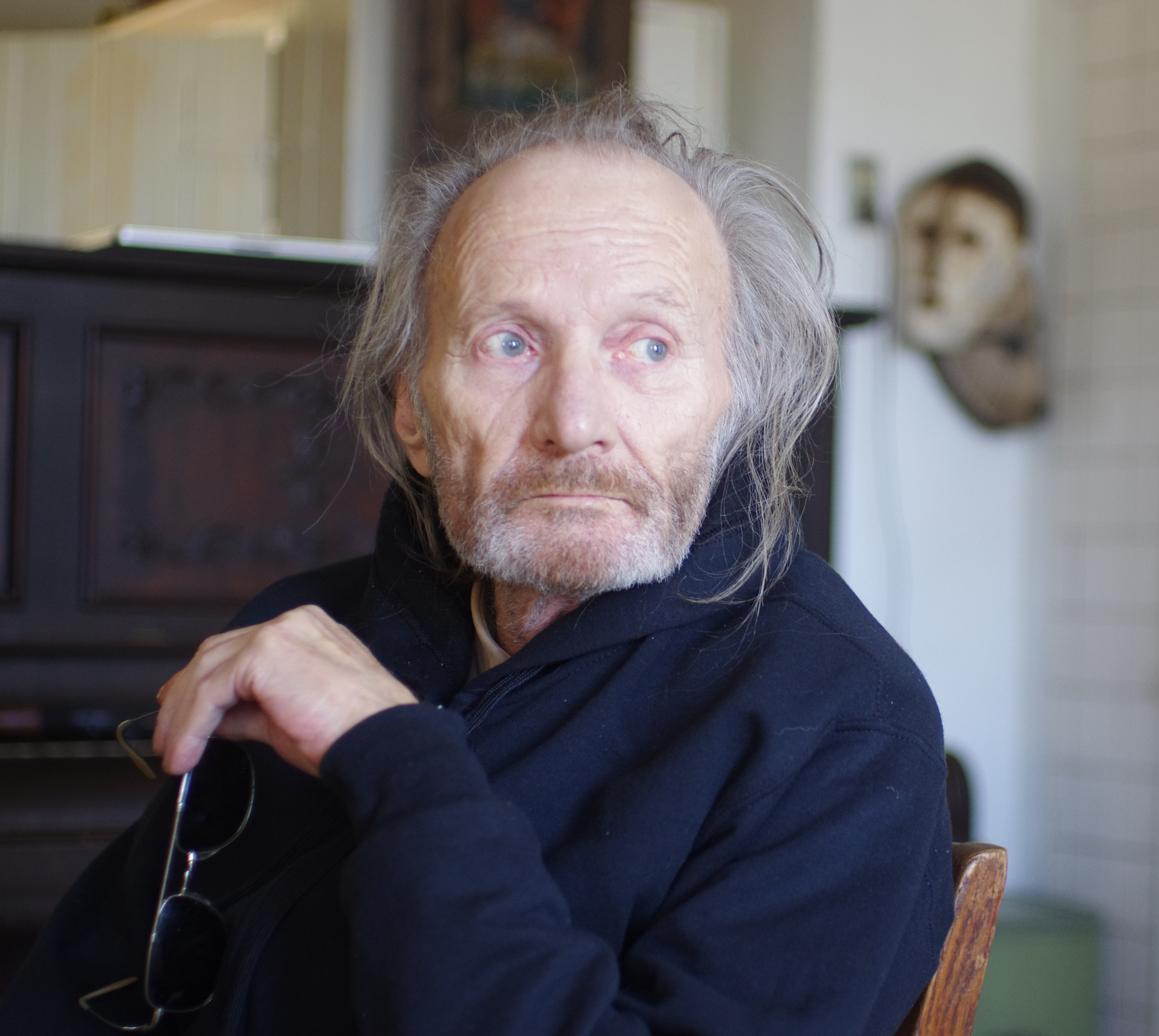
- Paul Rotterdam in 2013
- Born: 12 February 1939 (age 87); Wiener Neustadt, Austria
- Known for: Painting, drawing

Paul Rotterdam (born 12 February 1939 in Wiener Neustadt as Werner Paul Zwietnig-Rotterdam) is an Austrian painter. He currently resides in New York and Texas.

== Biography ==
Werner Paul Zwietnig-Rotterdam was born and grew up in Wiener Neustadt, Austria, which was heavily affected by bombing during World War II. After the war ended, in 1945, Rotterdam fled with his mother and sisters from the advancing Red Army to western Austria, which was occupied by American troops. There, he encountered African American soldiers for the first time, who helped the struggling family with food — an experience Rotterdam later described as an "encounter with angels." In 1947, the family moved to Leoben.

In 1960, after finishing school in Leoben, he moved to Vienna to take courses at the Akademie der angewandten Kunst and enrolled at the University of Vienna to study philosophy from 1960 to 1966 , focusing on visual theories in his dissertation. In 1961 he had his first exhibition of paintings at the Galleria Numero in Florence. In 1962 he had his first exhibition in Vienna.)

1965 he was selected to represent Austria at the Fourth Biennial of Young Artists in Paris and at the Eighth Biennial of International Art in Tokyo. Several solo exhibitions followed in Florence, Graz, and Vienna. In 1966 he received a PhD in philosophy from the University of Vienna. In 1967, he married his first wife, Heidrun Vogelberg. Their daughter Charlotte was born in 1969.

In 1968, Rotterdam was appointed Associate Professor at the Visual Arts Center of Harvard University in Cambridge, Massachusetts. In 1975, he also held a visiting professorship at the Cooper Union School of Art in New York City. After a creative period in Paris in 1977, during which he exhibited at the Piltzer and Maeght galleries, he published a book featuring drawings and texts by Kenneth Wahl.

In 1979, Paul Rotterdam was awarded a one-year visiting professorship at the University of Texas at San Antonio, where he also co-authored the book Fourteen Stations of the Cross with Alvin Martin. That same year, his marriage ended.

From 1973 onward, Paul Rotterdam lived in a loft on West Broadway in New York City. He taught at Harvard University during the spring semesters. After concluding his teaching career in 1987, he retired to a farm in the state of New York, where he worked in his studio.

In 1986/87, the artist traveled extensively to the copperplate printing workshop of Rolf Meier in Winterthur and illustrated The Notebooks of Malte Laurids Brigge by Rainer Maria Rilke. In 1994/95, Paul Rotterdam returned to Vienna, where he gave 14 lectures during the spring semesters at the Academy of Fine Arts Vienna. In 1996, he married the painter Rebecca Littlejohn. In 2004, Prestel (Munich/New York) published a catalogue raisonné of his paintings and sculptures from 1953 to 2004. In 2007, a retrospective exhibition of his drawings was held at the Leopold Museum in Vienna. In 2014, he published a collection of public lectures in English (University of Chicago Press) and German (Hirmer Verlag, Munich) titled Wild Vegetation – From Art to Nature. In 2017, he held an exhibition together with Rebecca LittleJohn at the Museum of the City of Leoben.

In 2024, Paul Rotterdam published the book Nightbow and Other Events, containing autobiographical texts, reflections on art, and reproductions of his works.

In 2024, Rotterdam donated 29 paintings and drawings to the Lower Austrian State Collections to strengthen the presence of his work in Austria. This gesture was particularly important to him as it fulfilled a wish of his mother, who had always regretted that most of his works remained in the United States.

Rotterdam annually spends several weeks at the Benedictine Abbey of Seckau in Austria for peace, quiet, and reflection. He owns an extensive collection of African masks.

== Style ==
His paintings are abstract objects, mostly monochromatic or reduced in color. Physical forms extend from the canvas into space.

Art critic Dore Ashton writes about his style:

His idea of the painter’s mission resembles Rilke’s statement in a letter to his wife, that reality is not a lingering in dreams, intentions, or moods, but their transformation into real things. Rotterdam is a modern painter (although he questions his modernity and sometimes even provocatively denies it), creating images that are self-contained, physical entities. He is compelled to transform his intense emotions into tangible form.

Around 1980, his minimalist style began to expand and increasingly incorporated elements of nature.

After the end of his teaching career at Harvard University, Rotterdam increasingly turned toward impressions of nature, without relying on realistic representation. In the so-called *Blenheim Series*, he developed an independent artistic reality, in which emotion and the search for form became central.

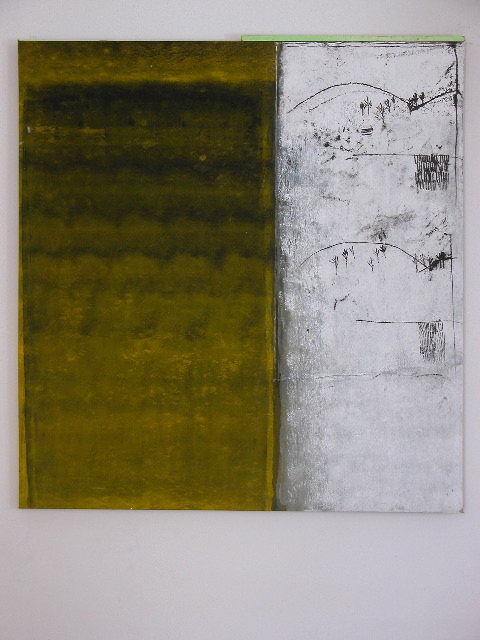
"Blenheim", 2003, Acrylic on canvas, 160 x 150 cm

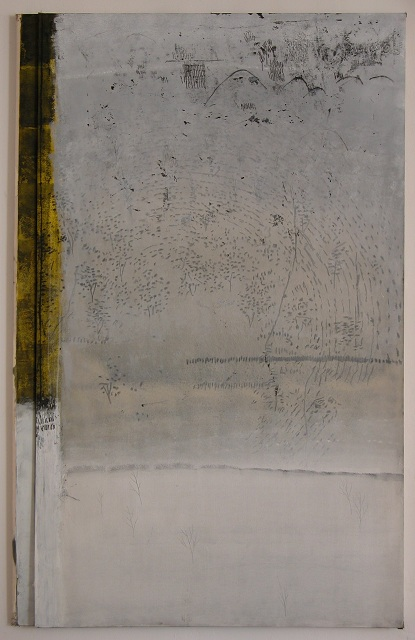
"Garden", 2006, Acrylic on canvas, 244 x 155 cm

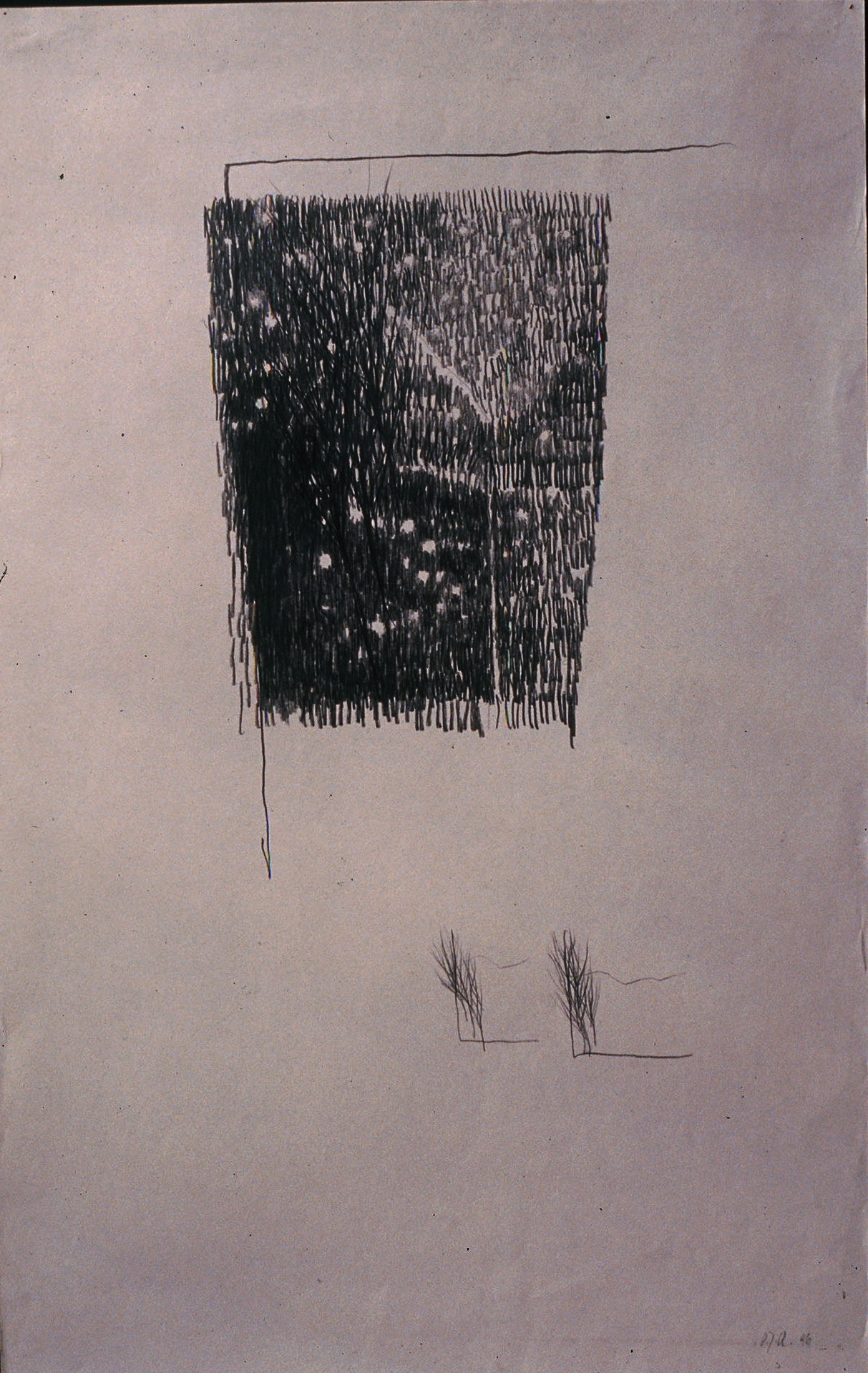
"Night", 1996, Graphite on paper, 88 x 567 cm

== Awards ==
- 2006: Kulturpreis der Stadt Leoben
- In 2007, he was awarded the Austrian Decoration for Science and Art.

== Exhibitions ==
Numerous solo exhibitions in galleries and museums. Selected group exhibitions include: 1975: Biennial Exhibition of Contemporary Art, Whitney Museum, New York. 1976: Artists-Immigrants of America 1876–1976, Hirshhorn Museum, Washington, D.C. 1980: American Drawing 1970–1980, Brooklyn Museum, New York. 1986: National Drawing Invitational, The Arkansas Arts Center, Little Rock. 1991: *Le Cabinet des Dessins*, Fondation Maeght, Saint-Paul, France. 1997: The New York School, Museum of Contemporary Art, Tokyo, Japan.

== Works in Public Collections ==
Albertina, Vienna. Busch-Reisinger Museum, Cambridge. Birmingham Museum of Art, Birmingham. Brooklyn Museum, New York. Cornell University Art Museum, Ithaca. Crystal Bridges Museum of American Art, Bentonville. Des Moines Art Center, Des Moines. Fogg Art Museum, Cambridge. Fondation Maeght, Saint-Paul de Vence. Solomon R. Guggenheim Museum, New York. Hirshhorn Museum, Washington, D.C. Joanneum Universal Museum, Graz. Leopold Museum, Vienna. The Metropolitan Museum of Art, New York. Museum of Modern Art, New York. Musée de Nice, Nice. Musée l’Abbaye Sainte-Croix, Les Sables-d’Olonne. Centre Pompidou (Musée National d'Art Moderne), Paris. Musée d’art contemporain de Montréal, Montreal. City Museum of Leoben, Leoben. Lower Austrian State Museum, St. Pölten. Ohara Museum, Tokyo. The Arkansas Arts Center, Little Rock. The National Museum of Art, Osaka. The Power Institute of Fine Arts, Sydney. The University of Arizona Museum of Art, Tucson. Walker Art Center, Minneapolis.

== Publications ==
- Paul Rotterdam. Ausstellung 1965. Exhibition catalog, Galerie im Griechenbeisl, 1965.
- Carl Aigner (ed.): Paul Zwietnig-Rotterdam. Worklist. painting, sculpture, projects. Werkliste. Malerei-Skulptur-Projekte. 1953–2004. With essays by Dore Ashton, Konrad Paul Liessmann, Joachim Rössl, Manfred Wagner et al., Prestel, Munich 2004 and 2007, ISBN 978-3-7913-3286-4.
- Alvin Martin: Paul Rotterdam: The 14 Stations of the Cross. The University of Texas, San Antonio 1982.
- Carter Ratcliff: Paul Rotterdam. Selected paintings 1972–1982. Storrer Edition, Zürich 1982.
- Joachim Rössl, Dore Ashton: Paul Zwietnig-Rotterdam. Ausgewählte Arbeiten, 1969–1989. Edited by the Department of Culture of Lower Austria, Vienna 1989, ISBN 3-85460-005-4.
- Kenneth Wahl: Paul Rotterdam: Selected drawings 1974–1977. Storrer Edition, Zürich 1977, ISBN 3-85908-001-X.
- Townsend Wolfe: Paul Zwietnig-Rotterdam. A Drawing Retrospective 1969–1994. The Arkansas Arts Center, Little Rock 1995.
- Paul Zwietnig Rotterdam: Wilde Vegetation – Von Kunst zu Natur. Hirmer Verlag, München 2014, ISBN 978-3-7774-2228-2.
- Paul Rotterdam: Nachtbogen – The Nightbow and Other Events. Hirmer Verlag, München 2024, ISBN 978-3-7774-4402-4.

== Audio ==
- Heinz Janisch: Substanz – Der Maler Paul Rotterdam. Menschenbilder, 4. Oktober 2009.
- Ö1: Gedanken – Über das Geistige in der Kunst, 2. Februar 2025.
