= List of Donald Trump 2024 presidential campaign international endorsements =

List of notable international officials that have endorsed Donald Trump for the 2024 U.S. presidential election.

== Heads of state and government ==
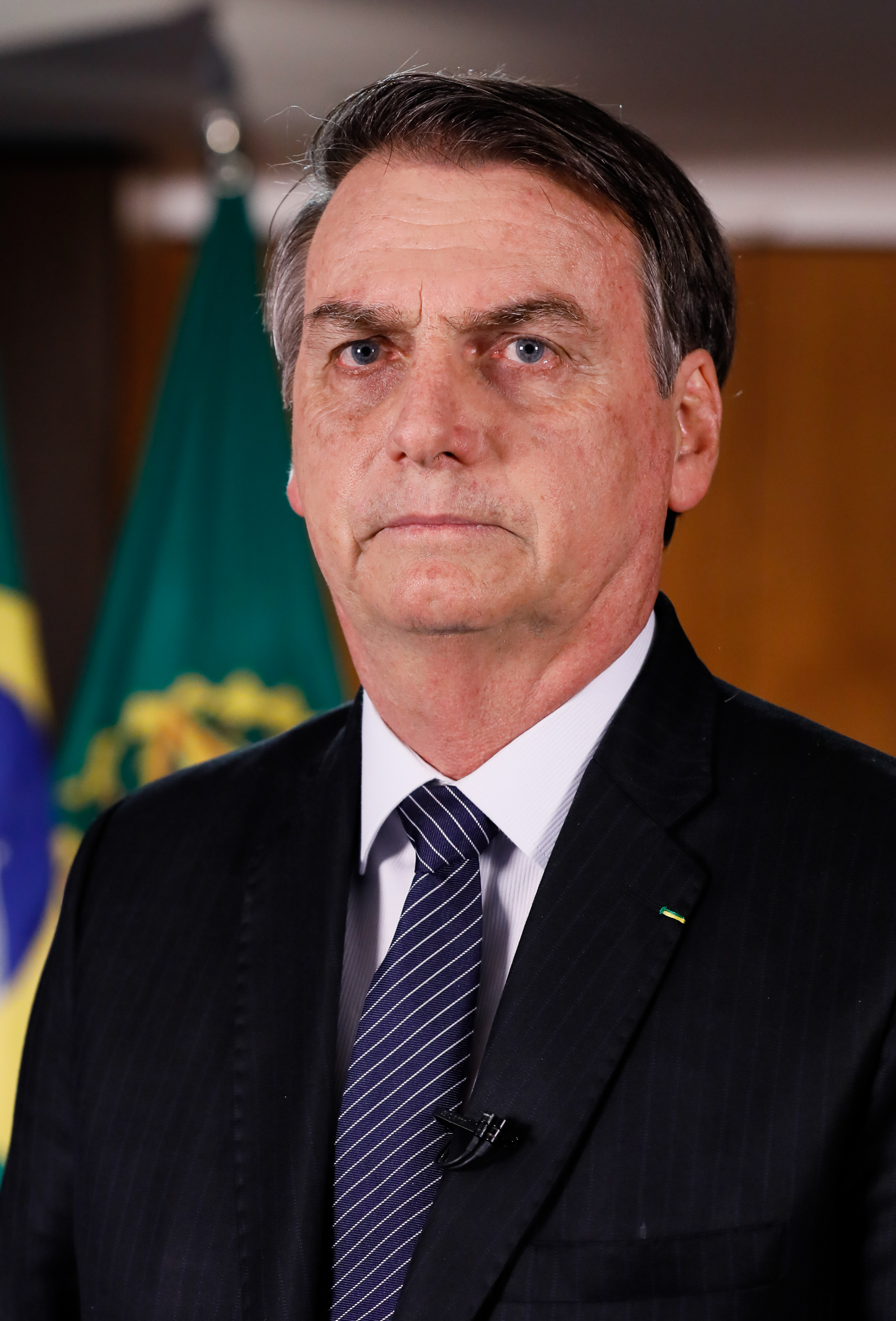
Jair Bolsonaro

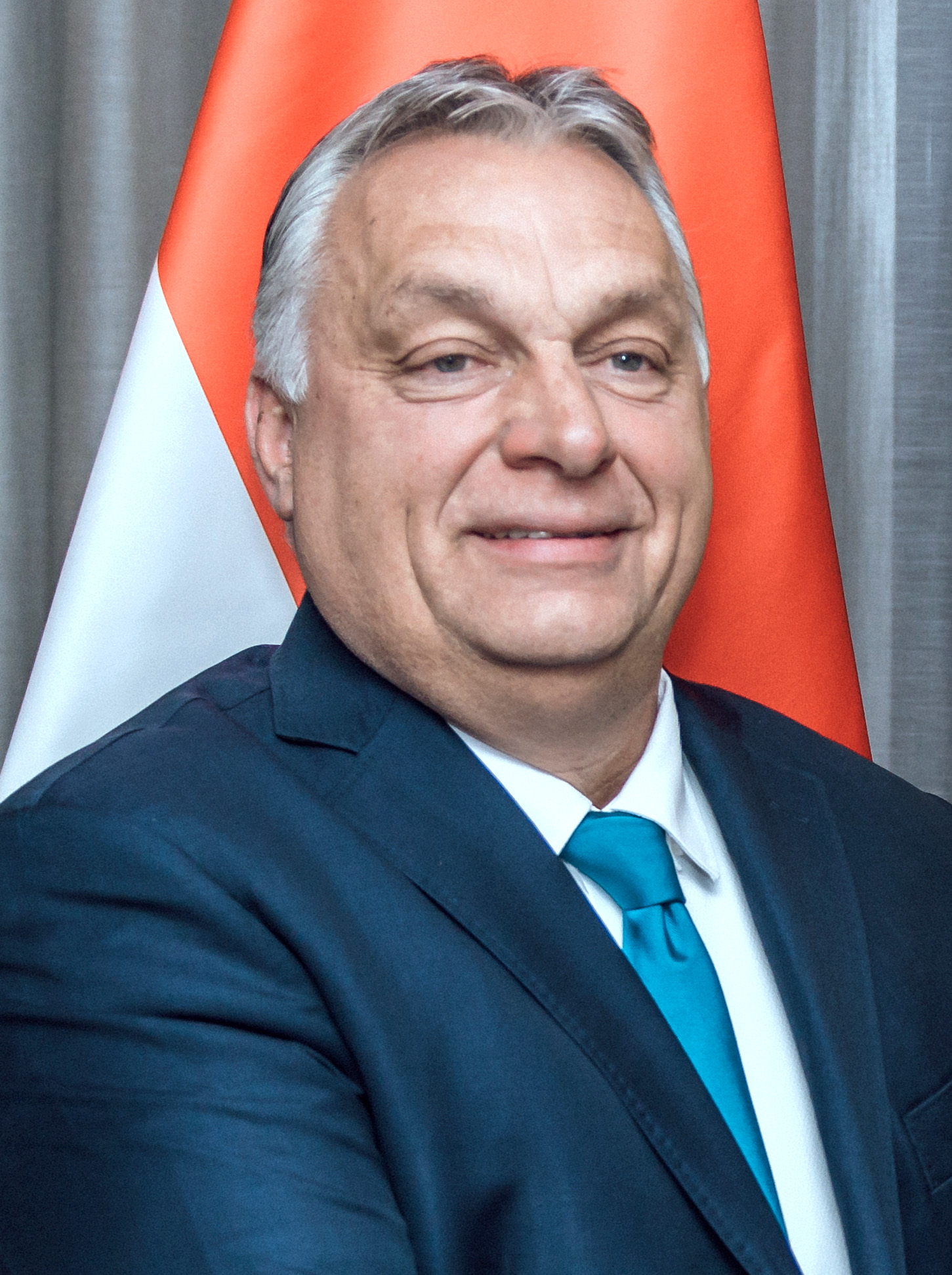
Viktor Orbán

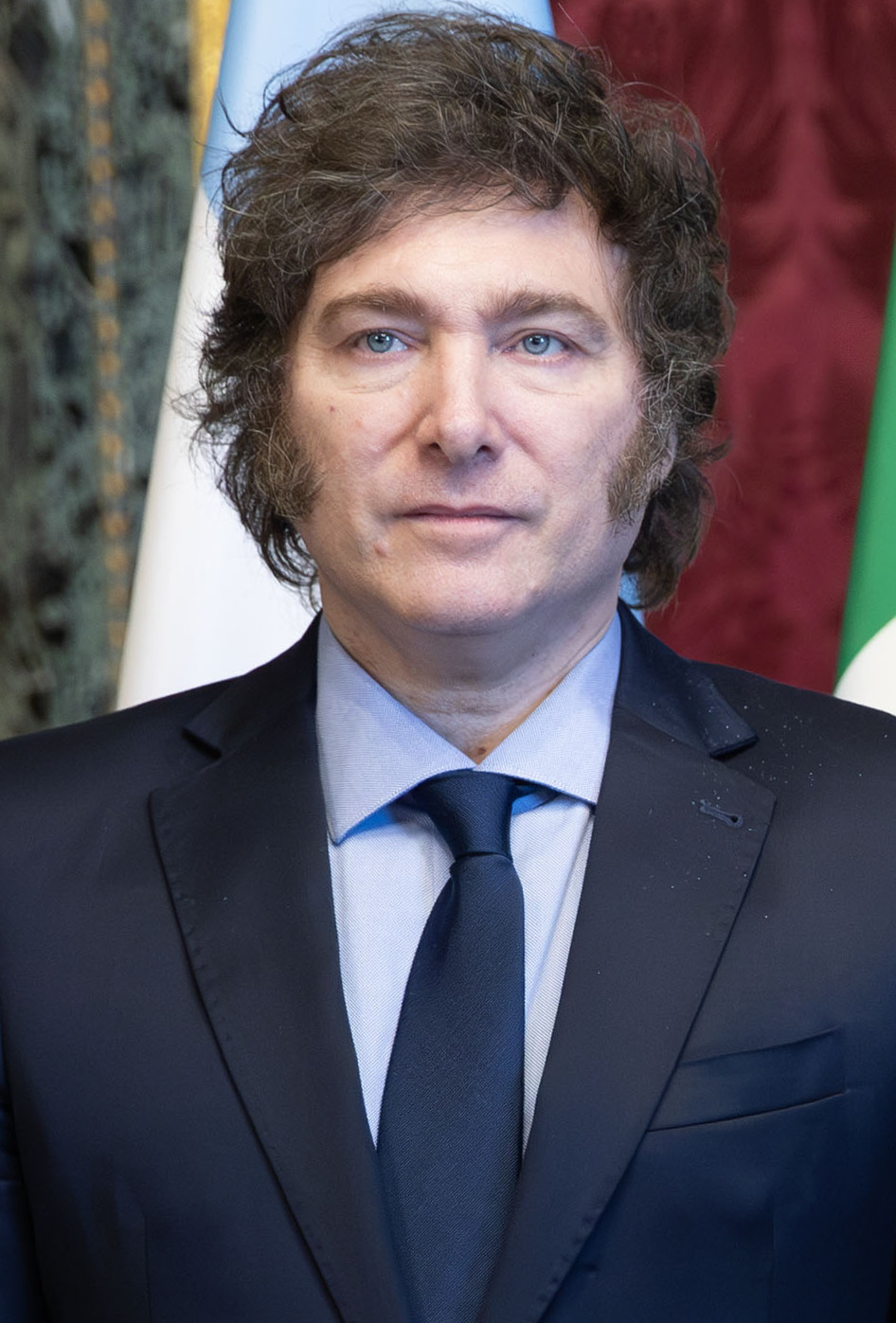
Javier Milei

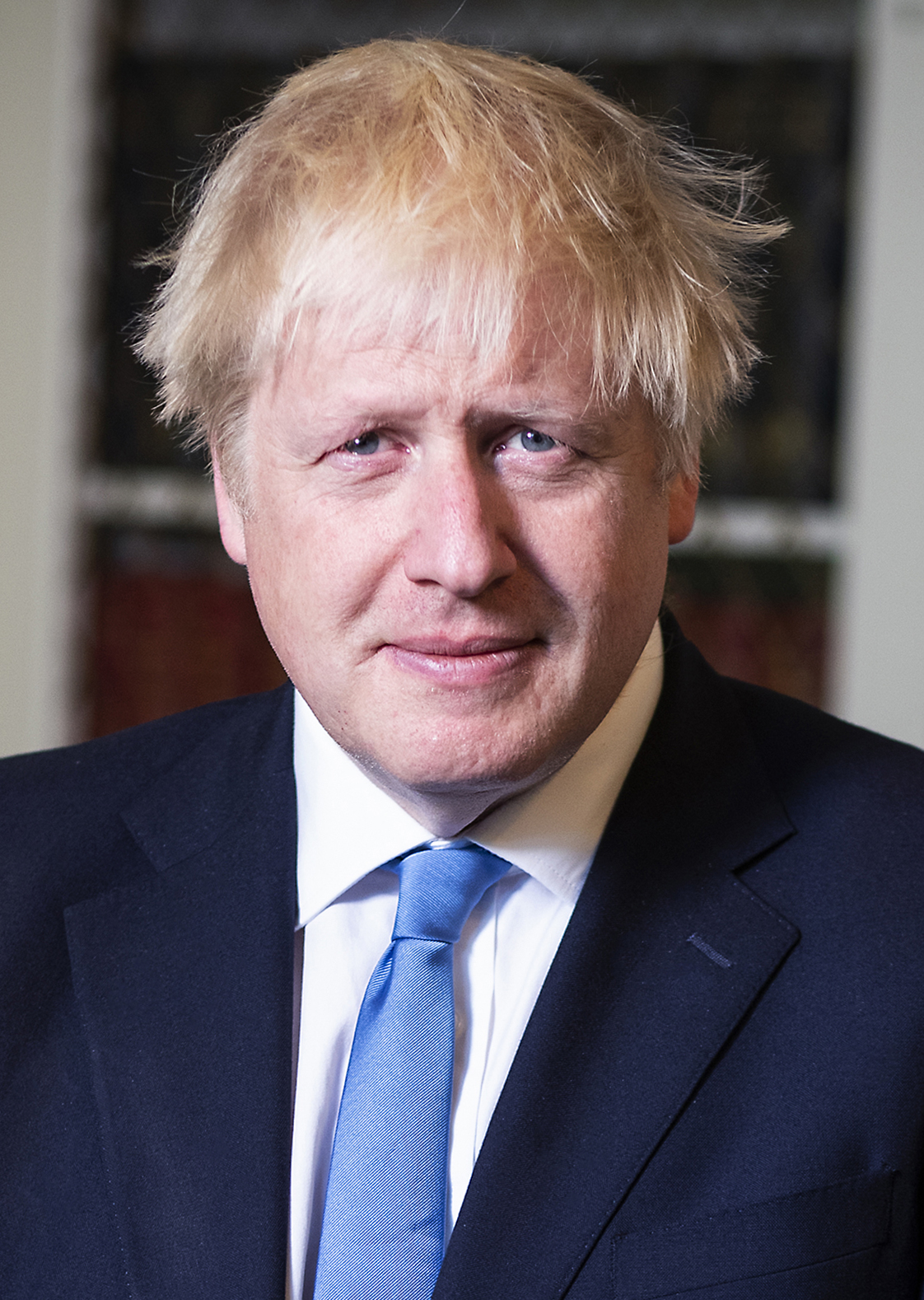
Boris Johnson

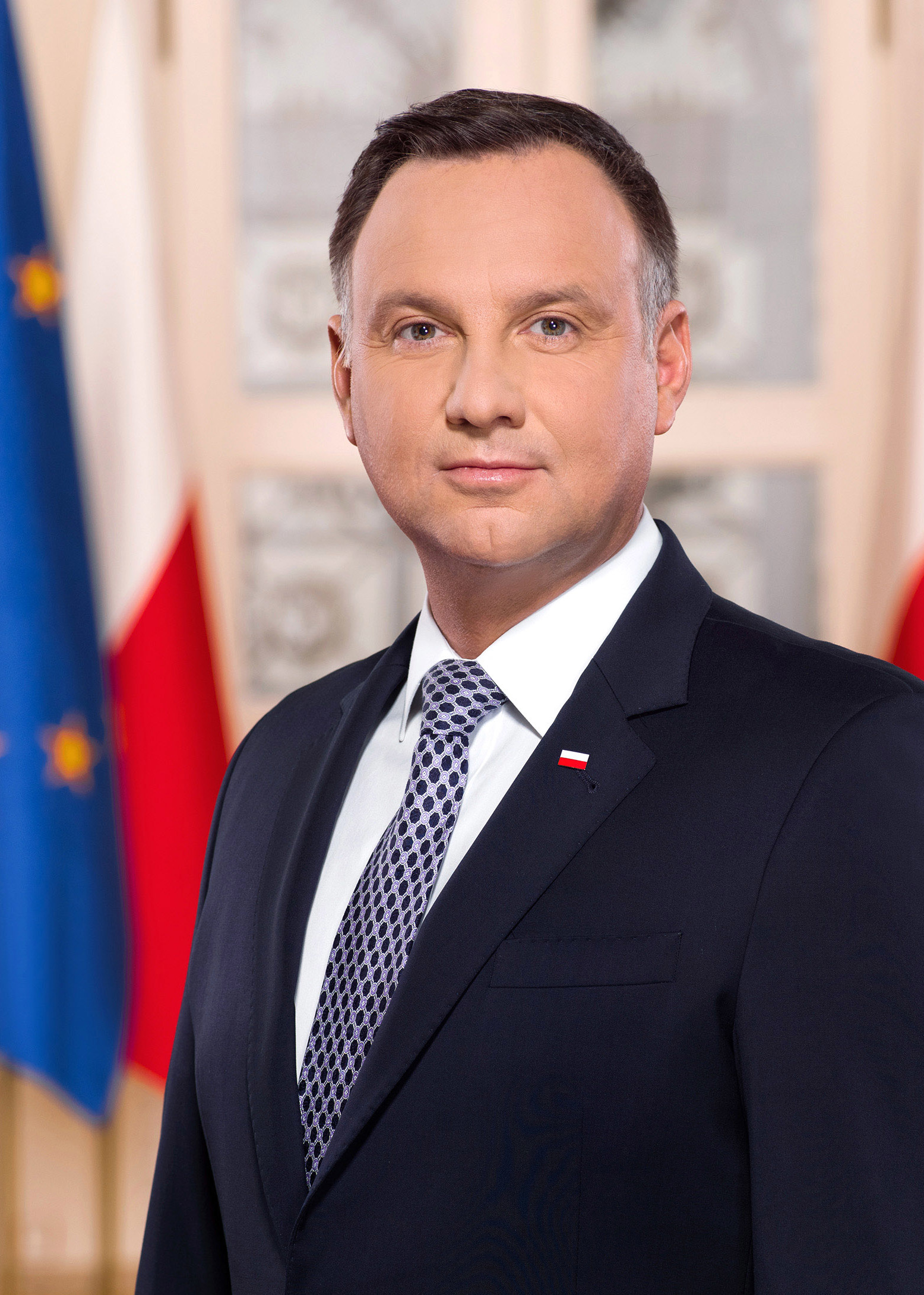
Andrzej Duda

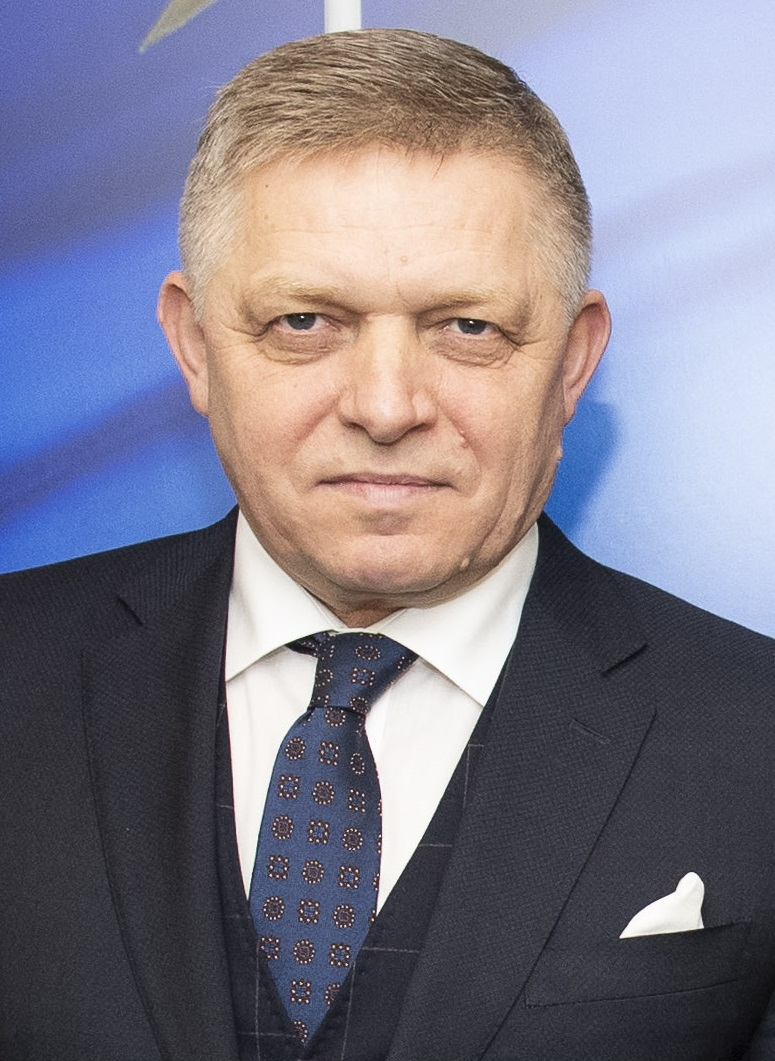
Robert Fico

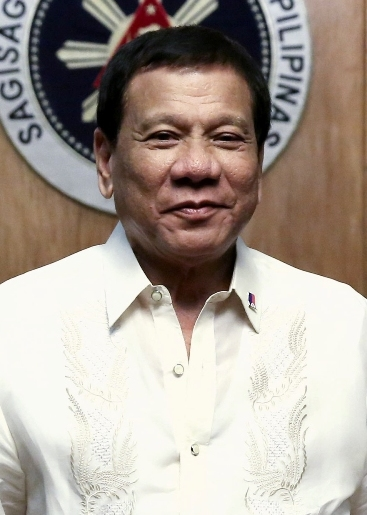
Rodrigo Duterte

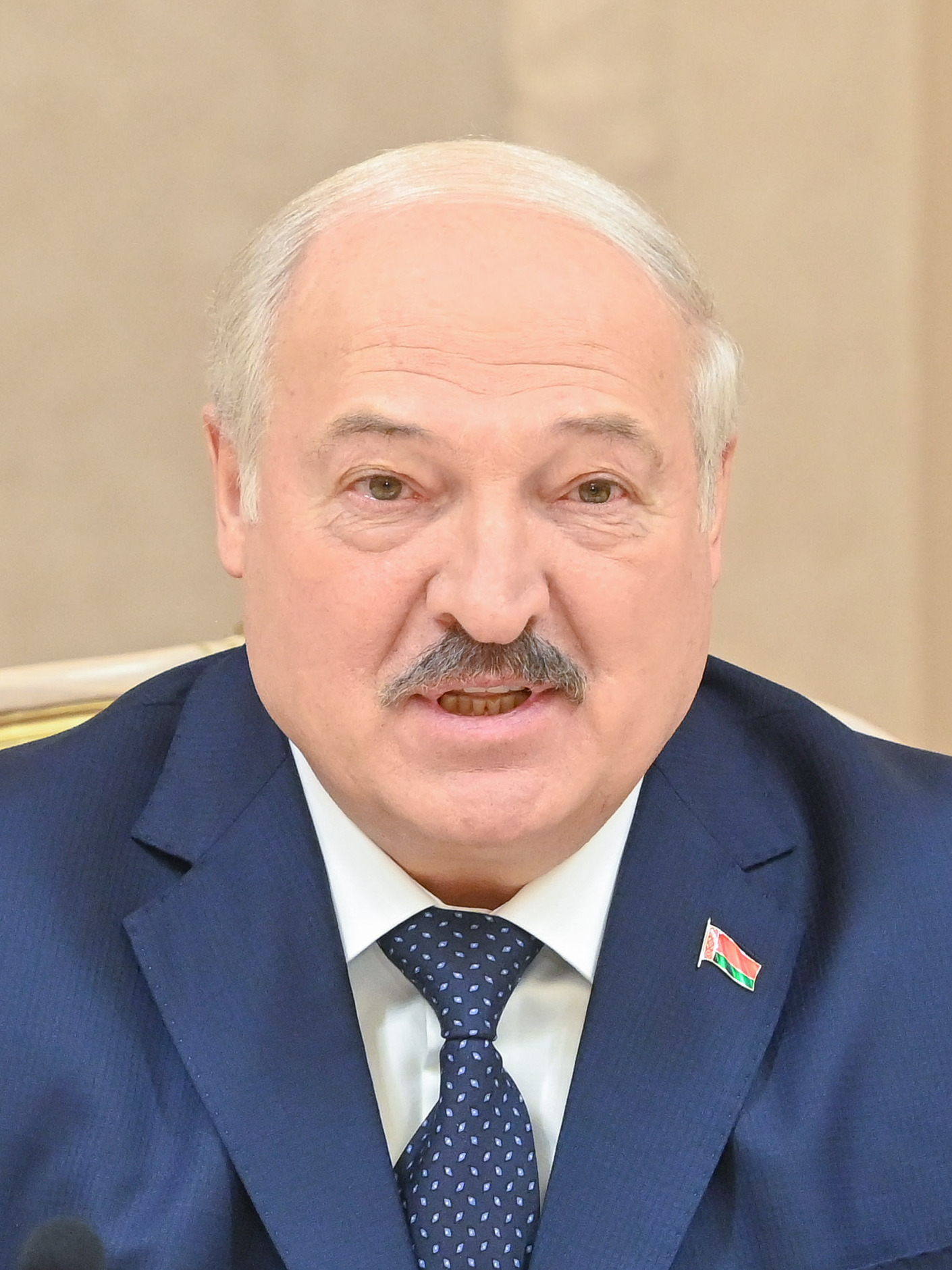
Alexander Lukashenko

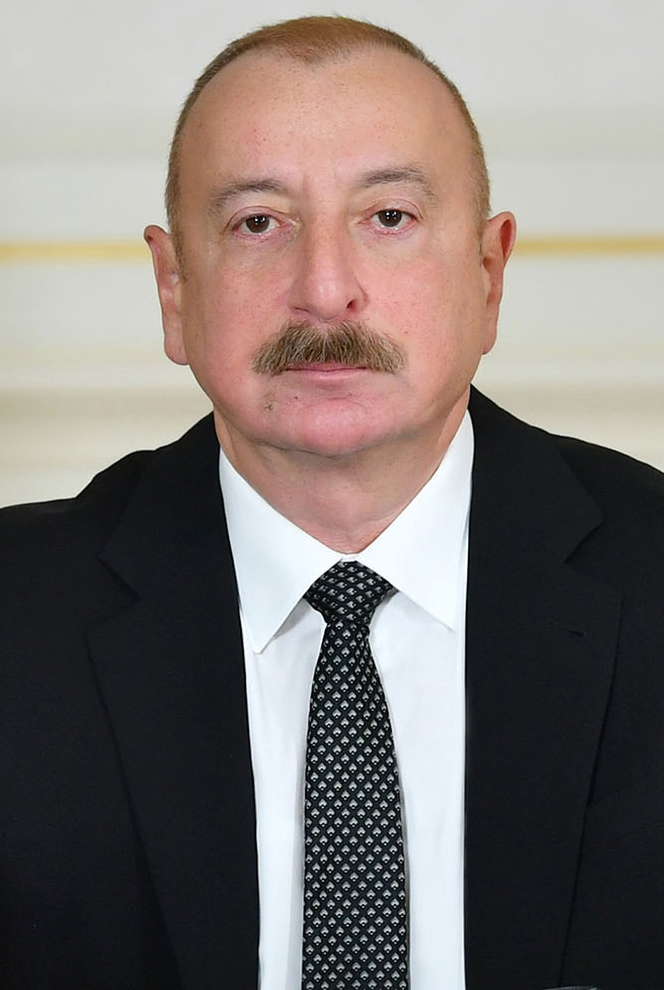
Ilham Aliyev

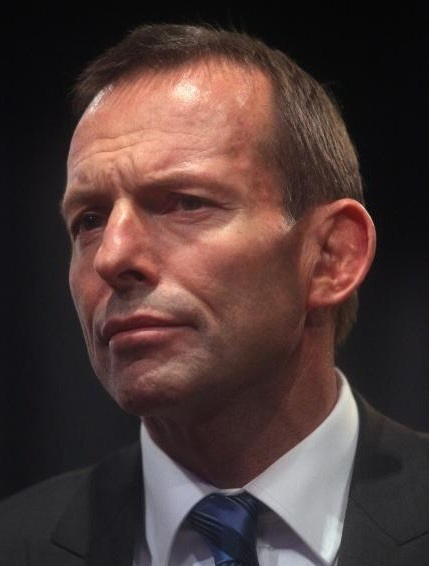
Tony Abbott

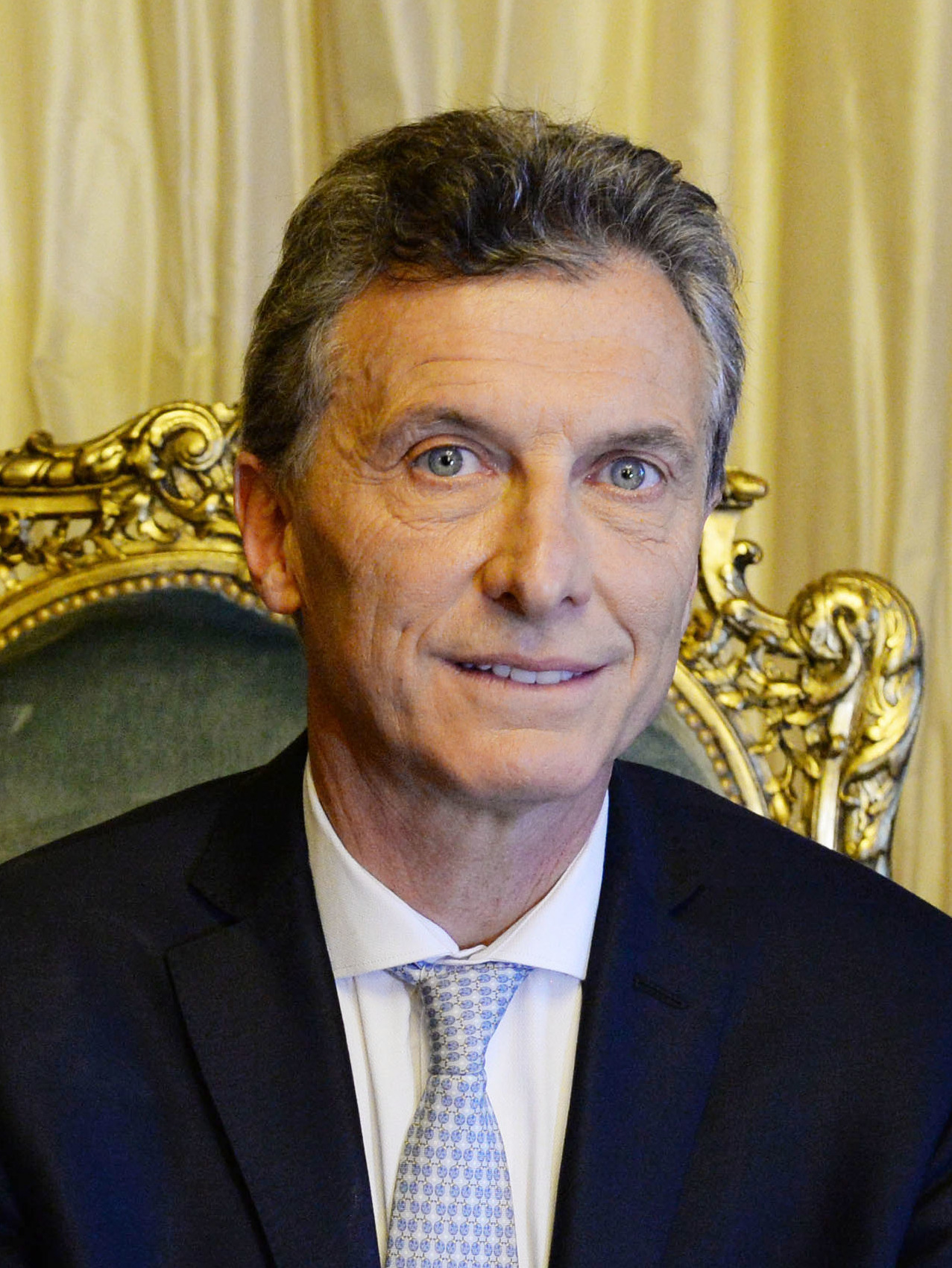
Mauricio Macri

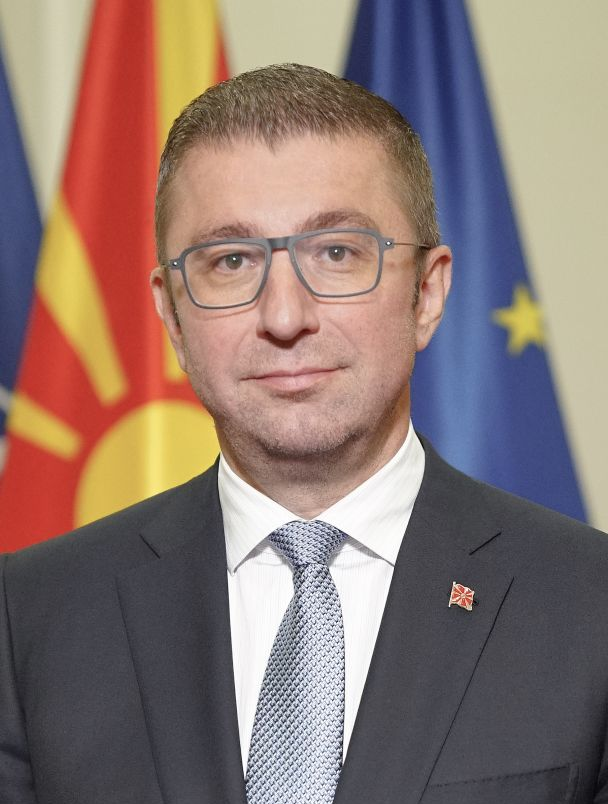
Hristijan Mickoski

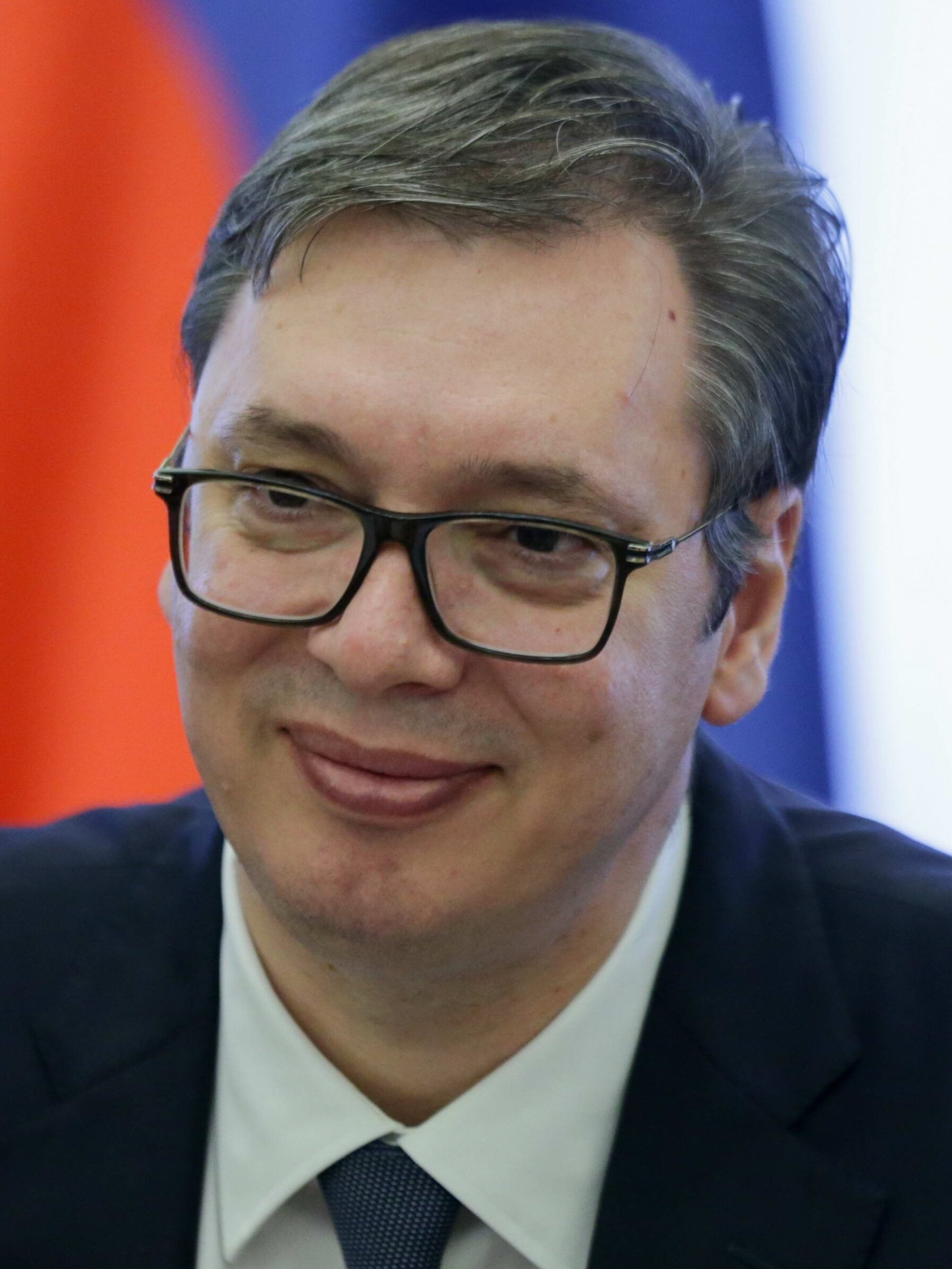
Aleksandar Vučić

=== Current ===
- Ilham Aliyev, President of Azerbaijan (2003–present), Prime Minister of Azerbaijan (2003), Chairman of the Turkic Council (2019–2021), and Secretary General of the Non-Aligned Movement (2019–2024) (New Azerbaijan Party)
- Andrzej Duda, President of Poland (2015–2025), Member of the European Parliament for Lesser Poland and Świętokrzyskie (2014–2015), Member of the Polish Sejm for 13 – Kraków II (2011–2014), and Member of the Kraków City Council for 2 – Prądnik Biały/Krowodrza (2010–2011) (Independent)
- Robert Fico, Prime Minister of Slovakia (2006–2010, 2012–2018, 2023–present), Deputy Speaker of the National Council (2010–2012), and Member of National Council (1992–2006, 2010–2012, 2018–2023) (Direction – Social Democracy)
- Alexander Lukashenko, President of Belarus (1994–present), Chairman of the All-Belarusian People's Assembly (2024–present), Chairman of the Supreme State Council of the Union State (2000–present), and Member of the Supreme Council of Belarus (1991–1994) (Independent)
- Hristijan Mickoski, Prime Minister of North Macedonia (2024–present) and Leader of the Opposition (2017–2024) (VMRO-DPMNE)
- Javier Milei, President of Argentina (2023–present) and Member of the Argentine National Deputy (2021–2023) (La Libertad Avanza)
- Benjamin Netanyahu, Prime Minister of Israel (1996–1999, 2009–2021, 2022–present), Leader of the Opposition (1993–1996, 2006–2009, 2021–2022), and Permanent Representative of Israel to the United Nations (1984–1988) (Likud)
- Viktor Orbán, Prime Minister of Hungary (1998–2002, 2010–2026) and Member of the Hungarian National Assembly (1990–2026) (Fidesz)
- Aleksandar Vučić, President of Serbia (2017–present), Prime Minister of Serbia (2014–2017), First Deputy Prime Minister of Serbia (2012–2014), Minister of Defence of Serbia (2012–2013), and Minister of Information of Serbia (1998–2000) (Serbian Progressive Party)

=== Former ===
- Tony Abbott, Prime Minister of Australia (2013–2015), Leader of the Opposition (2009–2013), Leader of the Australian House (2002–2007), and Member of the Australian Parliament for Warringah (1994–2019) (Liberal Party of Australia)
- Andrej Babiš, Prime Minister of the Czech Republic (2017–2021), First Deputy Prime Minister of the Czech Republic (2014–2017), Finance Minister of the Czech Republic (2014–2017), and Member of the Czech Chamber of Deputies for Ústí nad Labem Region (2021–present), Central Bohemian Region (2017–2021), and Prague (2013–2017) (ANO)
- Sali Berisha, President of Albania (1992–1997), Prime Minister of Albania (2005–2013), Leader of the Opposition (1991–1992, 1997–2005, 2022–present), Leader of the Democratic Party (1990–1992, 1997–2013, 2022–present), and Member of the Albanian Parliament (1991–present) (Democratic Party of Albania)
- Jair Bolsonaro, President of Brazil (2019–2023), Member of the Brazilian Chamber of Deputies for Rio de Janeiro (1991–2018), and Councillor of Rio de Janeiro (1989–1991) (Liberal Party)
- Milorad Dodik, President of Republika Srpska (2010–2018, 2022–present), Chairman of the Presidency of Bosnia and Herzegovina (2018–2019, 2020–2021), Serb Member of the Presidency of Bosnia and Herzegovina (2018–2022), and Prime Minister of Republika Srpska (1998–2001, 2006–2010) (Alliance of Independent Social Democrats)
- Rodrigo Duterte, Chairman of the Partido Demokratiko Pilipino (2016–present), President of the Philippines (2016–2022), Mayor of Davao City (1988–1998, 2001–2010, 2013–2016), Vice Mayor of Davao City (1986–1987, 2010–2013), and Member of the Filipino House of Representatives for Davao City's 1st district (1998–2001) (Partido Demokratiko Pilipino)
- Boris Johnson, Prime Minister of the United Kingdom (2019–2022), Secretary of State for Foreign and Commonwealth Affairs of the United Kingdom (2016–2018), Mayor of London (2008–2016), and Member of the UK Parliament for Uxbridge and South Ruislip (2015–2023) and Henley (2001–2008) (Conservative Party)
- John Key, Prime Minister of New Zealand (2008–2016), Leader of the Opposition (2006–2008), Chairman of the International Democrat Union (2014–2018), and Member of the New Zealand Parliament for Helensville (2002–2017) (New Zealand National Party)
- Václav Klaus, President of the Czech Republic (2003–2013), Prime Minister of the Czech Republic (1992–1998), President of the Czech Chamber of Deputies (1998–2002), and Minister of Finance of Czechoslovakia (1989–1992) (Independent)
- Mauricio Macri, President of the Republican Proposal (2005–2012, 2024–present), President of Argentina (2015–2019), President pro tempore of the Union of South American Nations (2017–2018), Chief of Government of Buenos Aires (2007–2015), and Member of the Argentine National Deputy (2005–2007) (Republican Proposal)
- Kamla Persad-Bissessar, Prime Minister of Trinidad and Tobago (2010-2015), Leader of the Opposition (2006-2007, 2010, 2015-present), Leader of the United National Congress (2010–present) and Member of the Trinidad and Tobago Parliament for Siparia (1995–present) (United National Congress)
- Gerhard Schröder, Chancellor of Germany (1998-2005) and Member of the Bundestag for Lower Saxony (1980-1983, 1983-1986, 1998-2005) (Social Democratic Party)
- Liz Truss, Prime Minister of the United Kingdom (2022) and Member of the UK Parliament for South West Norfolk (2010–2024) (Conservative Party)
- Miloš Zeman, President of the Czech Republic (2013–2023), Prime Minister of the Czech Republic (1998–2002), President of the Czech Chamber of Deputies (1996–1998) (Independent)

== Executive officials ==
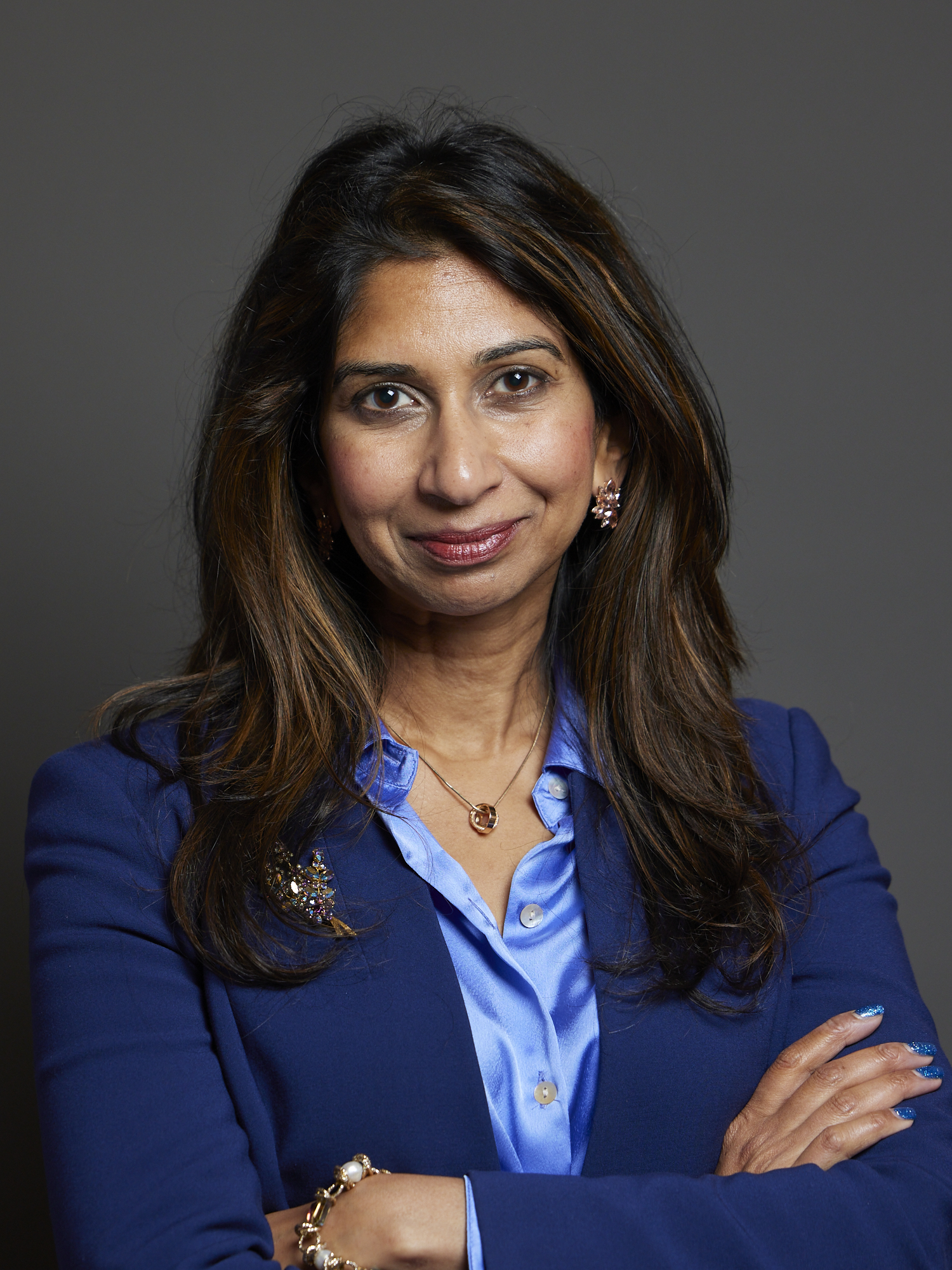
Suella Braverman

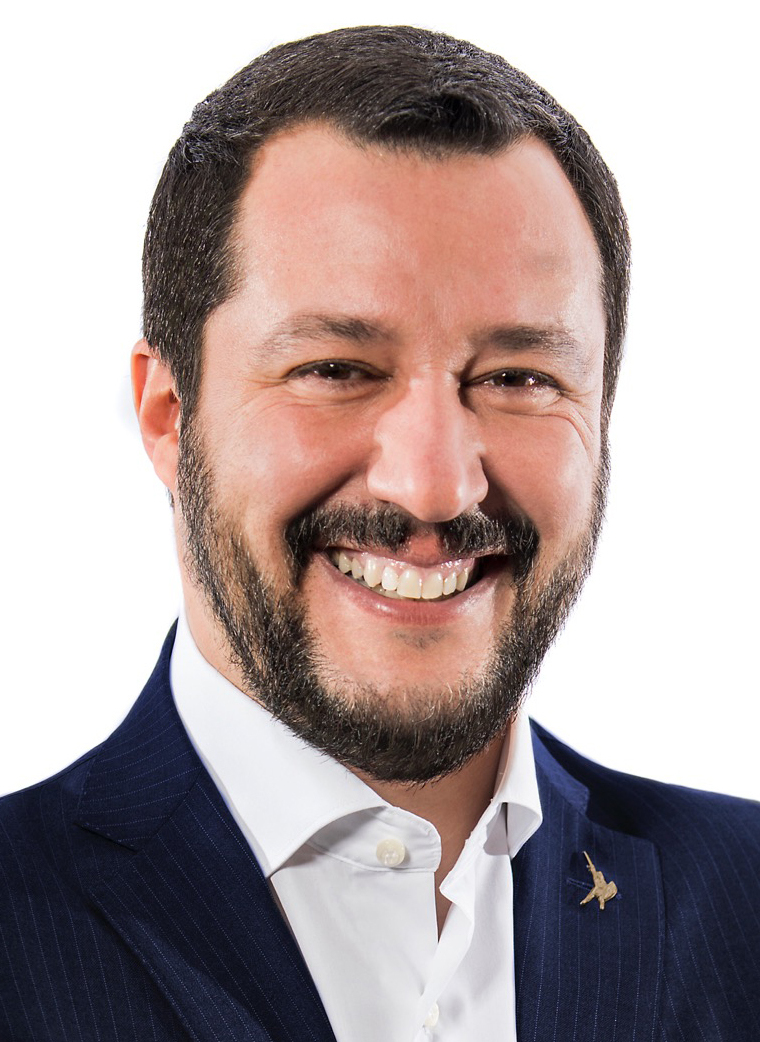
Matteo Salvini

=== Current ===
- Itamar Ben-Gvir, Minister of National Security of Israel (2022–present) (Otzma Yehudit)
- Amichai Chikli, Minister of Diaspora Affairs of Israel (2022–present) and Minister for Social Equality of Israel (2022–present) (Likud)
- Mariano Cúneo Libarona, Minister of Justice and Human Rights of Argentina (2023–present) (Independent)
- Balázs Orbán, Political Director of the Prime Minister of Hungary (2021–2026) and Member of the Hungarian National Assembly (2022–present) (Fidesz)
- María Consuelo Porras, Attorney General of Guatemala (2018–2026) and Deputy Magistrate of the Constitutional Court of Guatemala (2016–2018) (Independent)
- Matteo Salvini, Deputy Prime Minister of Italy (2018–2019, 2022–present) and Minister of Infrastructure and Transport of Italy (2022–present) (Lega)
- Bezalel Smotrich, Minister of Finance of Israel (2022–present) (National Religious Party–Religious Zionism)
- Péter Szijjártó, Minister of Foreign Affairs of Hungary (2014–2026) and President of the Committee of Ministers of the Council of Europe (2021) (Fidesz)

=== Former ===
- Damares Alves, Brazilian Senator for the Federal District (2023–present), and Minister of Women, Families, and Human Rights of Brazil (2019–2022) (Republicans)
- Per-Willy Amundsen, Member of the Norwegian Storting for Troms (2005–2013, 2017–present), Ministry of Justice and Public Security of Norway (2016–2018), and State Secretary to the Minister of Local Government and Modernisation of Norway (2013–2016) (Progress Party)
- Jake Berry, Minister without Portfolio of the United Kingdom (2022), Minister of State for the Northern Powerhouse and Local Growth of the United Kingdom (2017–2020), and Member of the UK Parliament for Rossendale and Darwen (2010–2024) (Conservative Party)
- Michelle Bolsonaro, first lady of Brazil (2019–2023) (Liberal Party)
- Richard Brabec, Deputy Prime Minister of the Czech Republic (2017–2019), Minister of the Environment (2014–2021), Member of the Czech Chamber of Deputies (2013–present) (ANO 2011)
- Suella Braverman, Member of the UK Parliament for Fareham and Waterlooville (2024–present) and Fareham (2015–2024), Secretary of State for the Home Department of the United Kingdom (September–October 2022, 2022–2023), and Attorney General for England and Wales Advocate General for Northern Ireland (2020–2021, 2021–2022) (Conservative Party)
- Ivan David, Minister of Health (1998–1999), Member of the European Parliament for Czech Republic (2019–present), Member of Czech Chamber of Deputies (1998–2002) (SPD)
- Klára Dostálová, Minister for Local Development (2017–2021), Member of the European Parliament for Czech Republic (2024–present), Member of Czech Chamber of Deputies (2017–2024) (ANO 2011)
- Femi Fani-Kayode, Minister of Culture and Tourism of Nigeria (2006) and Minister of Aviation of Nigeria (2006–2007) (Peoples Democratic Party)
- John Hayes, Member of the UK Parliament for South Holland and the Deepings (1997–present), Minister of State for Transport of the United Kingdom (2014–2015, 2016–2018), Minister of State for Security of the United Kingdom (2015–2016), and Minister without Portfolio of the United Kingdom Senior Parliamentary Adviser to the Prime Minister (2013–2014) (Conservative Party)
- Joe Hockey, Ambassador of Australia to the United States (2016–2020), Treasurer of Australia (2013–2015), Manager of Opposition Business in the Australian House (2007–2009), and Member of the Australian Parliament for North Sydney (1996–2015) (Liberal Party of Australia)
- Andrea Jenkyns, Parliamentary Under-Secretary of State for Skills of the United Kingdom (2022) and Member of the UK Parliament for Morley and Outwood (2015–2024) (Conservative Party)
- Robert Jenrick, Member of the UK Parliament for Newark (2014–present), Minister of State for Immigration of the United Kingdom (2022–2023), Minister of State for Health of the United Kingdom (2022), Secretary of State for Housing, Communities and Local Government of the United Kingdom (2019–2021), and Exchequer Secretary to the Treasury of the United Kingdom (2018–2019) (Conservative Party)
- Panos Kammenos, Minister for National Defence of Greece (2015–2019) and Leader of the Independent Greeks (2012–2020) (Independent)
- Guillermo Moreno, Secretary of Domestic Trade of Argentina (2006–2013) (Principles and Values)
- Jacob Rees-Mogg, Secretary of State for Business, Energy and Industrial Strategy of the United Kingdom (2022), Leader of the UK House of Commons Lord President of the Council (2019–2022), and Member of the UK Parliament for North East Somerset (2010–2024) (Conservative Party)
- Vojislav Šešelj, Deputy Prime Minister of Serbia (1998–2000), Member of the Serbian National Assembly (1991–1998, 2000–2003, 2016–2020), and President of the Zemun Municipality (1996–1998) (Serbian Radical Party)
- Alena Schillerová, Deputy Prime Minister of the Czech Republic (2019–2021), Minister of Finance (2017–2021), Member of the Czech Chamber of Deputies (2021–present) (ANO 2011)
- Justin Sun, Permanent Representative of Grenada to the World Trade Organization (2021–2023) (Independent)
- Radostin Vasilev, Minister of Youth and Sports of Bulgaria (2021–2022), Member of the Bulgarian National Assembly (2021–2024), and Leader of the Morality, Unity, Honour Party (2024–present) (Morality, Unity, Honour)
- Alexandr Vondra, Member of the European Parliament for the Czech Republic (2019–2015), Deputy Chairman of the Civic Democratic Party (2014–present), Deputy Prime Minister of Czech Republic (2007–2009), Minister of Defence of Czech Republic (2010–2012), Minister for European Affairs of Czech Republic (2007–2009), Minister of Foreign Affairs of Czech Republic (2006–2007), Ambassador of the Czech Republic to the United States (1997–2001), and Senator for 29 – Litoměřice (2006–2012) (Civic Democratic Party)

== Regional officials ==
=== Current ===
- Jhonny Fernández, Mayor of Santa Cruz de la Sierra (1997-2002, 2021-present) (Solidarity Civic Unity)
- Tarcísio de Freitas, Governor of São Paulo (2023–present), Minister of Infrastructure of Brazil (2019–2022), and Director General of the National Department of Transport Infrastructure of Brazil (2014–2015) (Republicans)
- Jorginho Mello, Governor of Santa Catarina (2023–present), Brazilian Senator for Santa Catarina (2019–2023), and Member of the Brazilian Chamber of Deputies for Santa Catarina (2011–2019) (Liberal Party)

=== Former ===
- Jaroslava Pokorná Jermanová, Governor of the Central Bohemian Region (2016–2020), Member of the European Parliament for Czech Republic (2024–present), Member of Czech Chamber of Deputies (2013–2017, 2021–2024) (ANO 2011)
- Sammy Wilson, Member of the UK Parliament for East Antrim (2005–present), Minister of Finance and Personnel of Northern Ireland (2009–2013), and Minister of the Environment of Northern Ireland (2008–2009) (Democratic Unionist Party)

== Party officials ==
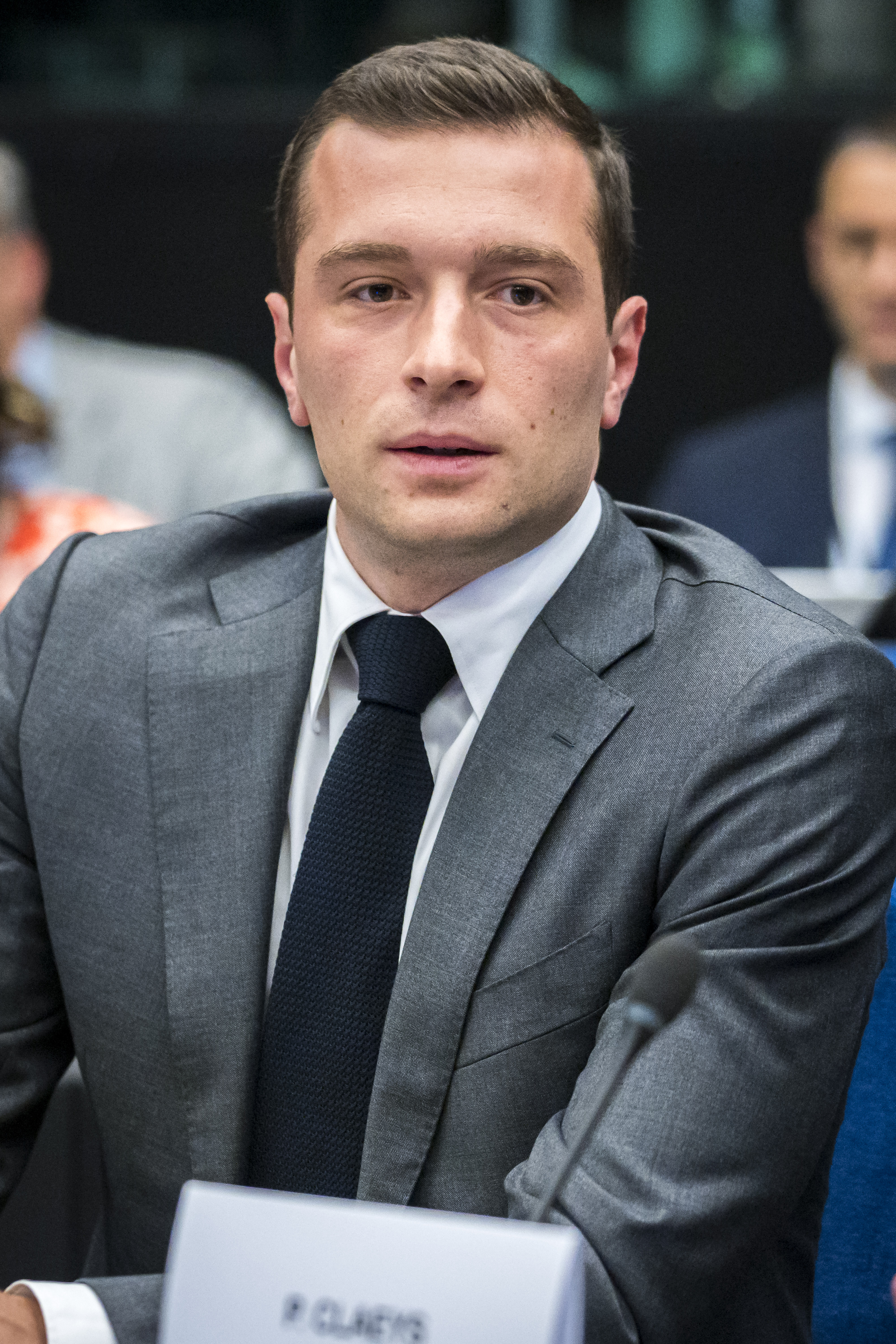
Jordan Bardella

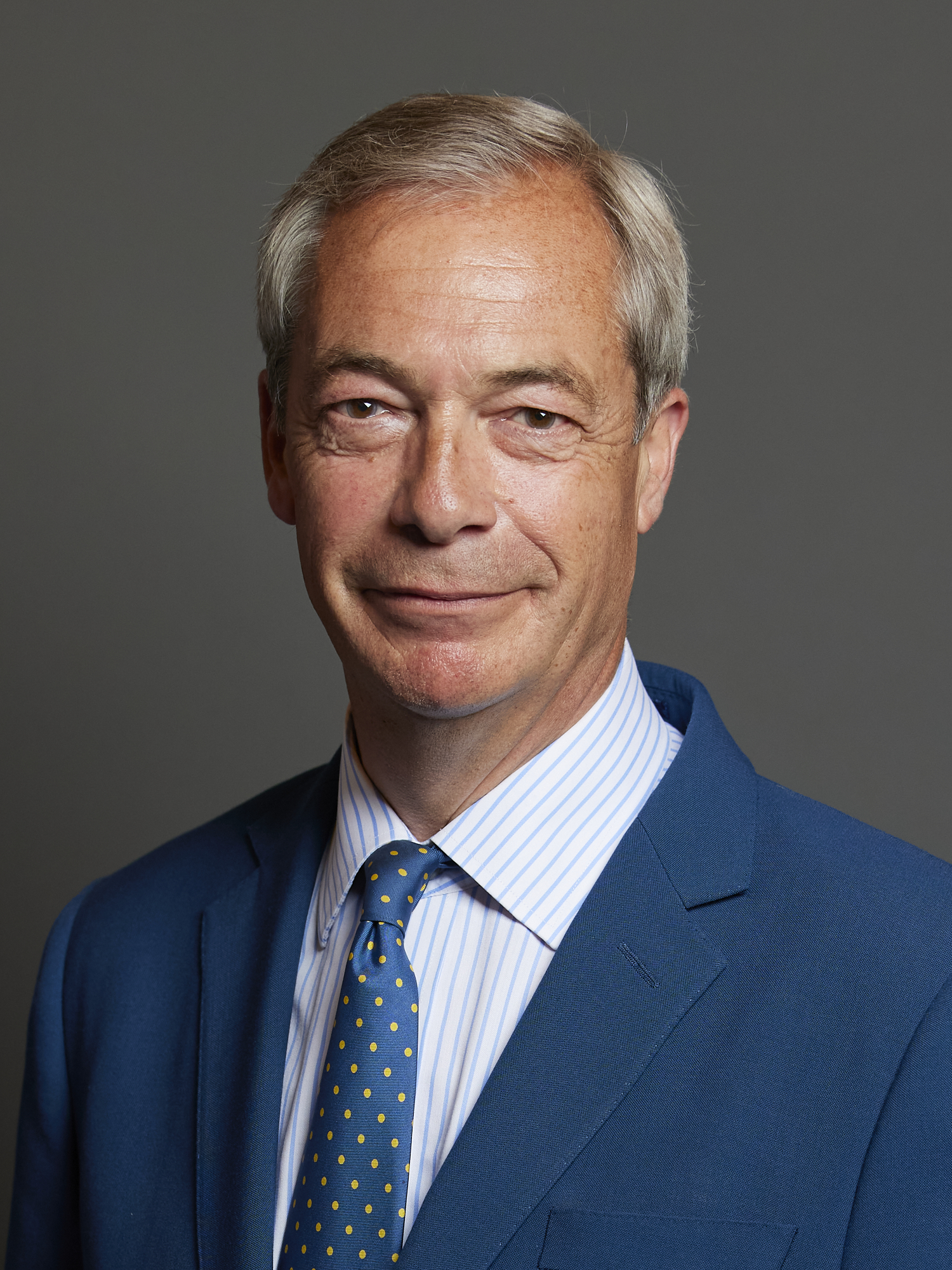
Nigel Farage

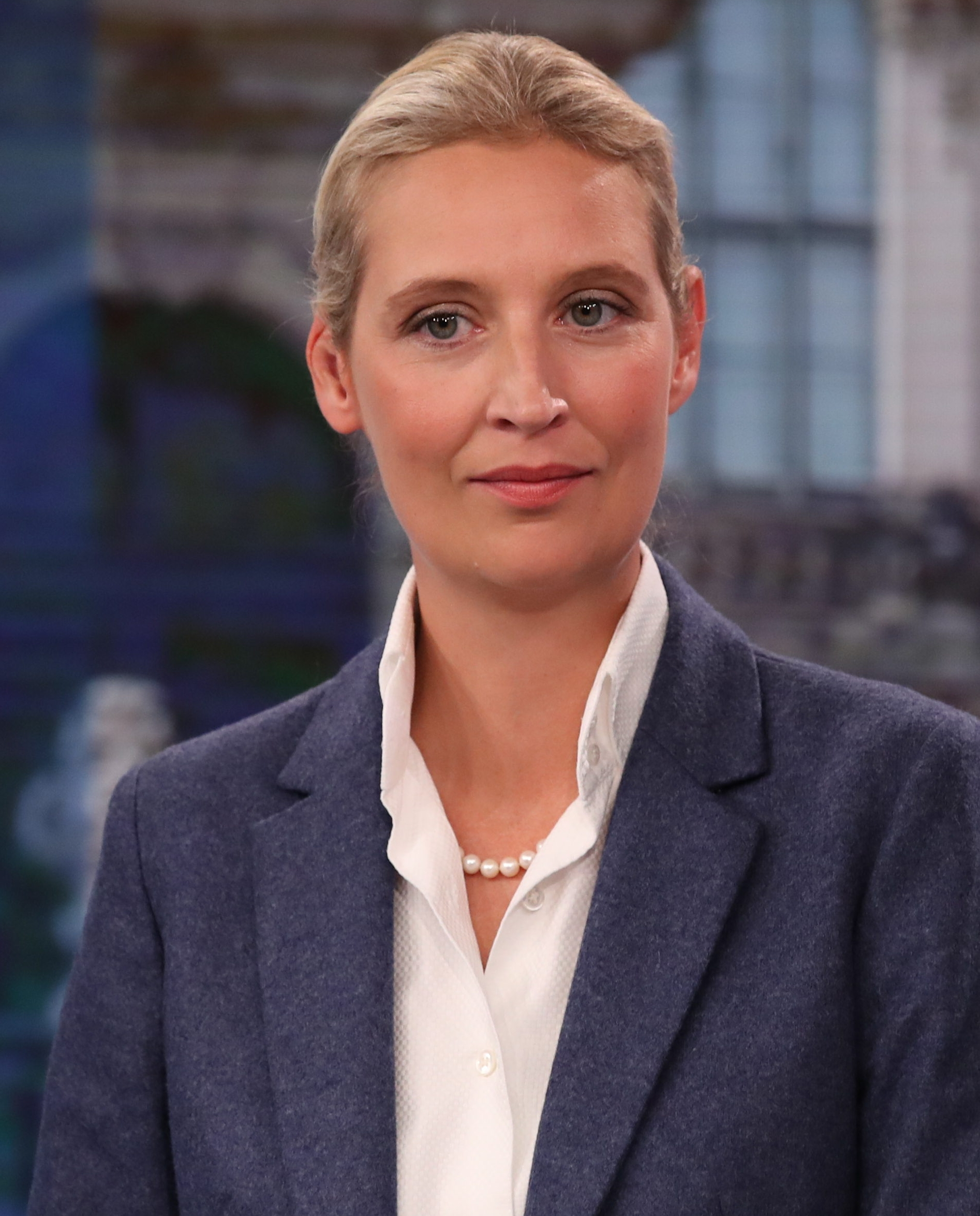
Alice Weidel

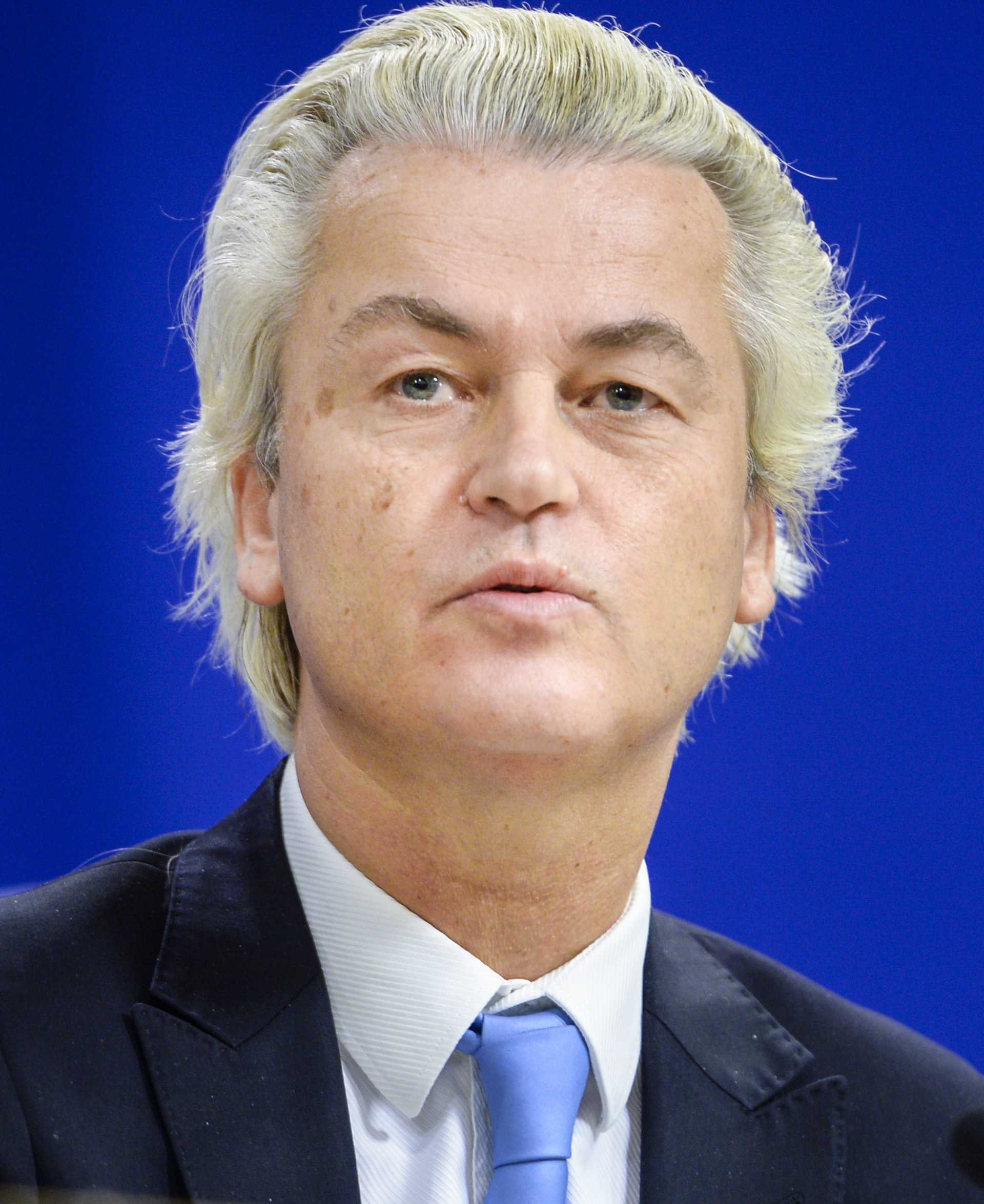
Geert Wilders

=== Current ===
- Santiago Abascal, President of Vox (2014–present), Member of the Spanish Congress of Deputies for Madrid (2019–present), Director of the Data Protection Agency of the Community of Madrid (2010–2012), and Member of the Basque Parliament for Álava (2004–2005, 2005–2009) (Vox)
- Jordan Bardella, President of the National Rally (2022-present) Leader of Patriots for Europe (2024–present), Member of the European Parliament for France (2019–present), and Member of the Regional Council of Île-de-France for Seine-Saint-Denis (2015–present) (National Rally)
- Maxime Bernier, Leader of the People's Party of Canada (2018–present), Member of Canadian Parliament for Beauce (2006–2019), Minister of Industry (2006–2007), Minister of Foreign Affairs (2007–2008) (People's Party)
- Nicolas Dupont-Aignan, President of the Debout la France (2008–present), Member of the French National Assembly for Essonne's 8th constituency (1997–2024), and Mayor of Yerres (1995–2017) (Debout la France)
- Krzysztof Bosak, Chairman of the National Movement (2023-present), Deputy Marshal of the Sejm (2023–present) and Member of the Sejm for Kielce (2019–2023), Zielona Góra (2005-2007), and Białystok (2023-present) (National Movement)
- Éric Ciotti, President of the Union of the Right for the Republic (2012-present), President of the UDR group in the National Assembly (2024–present), President of The Republicans (2022-2024), Member of the French National Assembly for Alpes-Maritimes's 1st constituency (2007–present), and President of the Department Council of Alpes-Maritimes (2008-2017) (Union of the Right for the Republic)
- Nigel Farage, Leader of Reform UK (2024–present, 2019–2021), Leader of UK Independence Party (1998–2000, 2006–2009, 2010–2016), Member of the UK Parliament for Clacton (2024–present) and Member of the European Parliament for South East England (1999–2020) (Reform UK)
- Laurence Fox, Actor and Leader of the Reclaim Party (2020–present) (Reclaim Party)
- Petras Gražulis, Chairman of the People and Justice Union (2021–present), Member of the European Parliament for Lithuania (2024–present), Member of the Lithuanian Seimas for Gargždai (2000–2016, 2020–2023) and Multi-member (1996–2000, 2016–2020) and Member of the Kaunas City Council (1990–1995) (People and Justice Union)
- Pauline Hanson, President of Pauline Hanson's One Nation (1997–present), Australian Senator for Queensland (2016–present), Member of the Australian Parliament for Oxley (1996–1998), and Councillor of the City of Ipswich for Division 7 (1994–1995) (Pauline Hanson's One Nation)
- Kellie-Jay Keen-Minshull, Leader of the Party of Women (2023–present) (Party of Women)
- Kateřina Konečná, Leader of the Communist Party of Bohemia and Moravia (2021–present), Member of the European Parliament for Czech Republic (2013–present) (KSČM)
- Kostadin Kostadinov, Leader of Revival (2014–present), Member of the Bulgarian National Assembly (2021–present) and Member of the Varna City Council (2011–2021) (Revival)
- Afroditi Latinopoulou, President of Voice of Reason Member of the European Parliament for Greece (2024–present) (Voice of Reason)
- Marion Maréchal, President of Identity–Liberties (2024–present), Executive Vice President of Reconquête (2022–2024), Member of the European Parliament for France (2024–present), and Member of the French National Assembly for Vaucluse's 3rd constituency (2012–2017) (Identity–Liberties)
- Sławomir Mentzen, President of New Hope (2022–present) and Member of the Sejm for Warsaw I (2014–2019) (New Hope)
- Valdemar Costa Neto, Leader of the Liberal Party (2020–present), Federal Deputy for São Paulo (1991, 2005, 2007–2013), and Leader of the Liberal Party (2000-2006) ((Liberal Party)
- Tomio Okamura, Leader of Freedom and Direct Democracy (2015–present), Leader of Dawn – National Coalition (2013–2015), Member of the Czech Chamber of Deputies (2013–present), Deputy President of the Czech Chamber of Deputies (2017–2021), and Czech Senator for Zlín (2012–2013) (Freedom and Direct Democracy)
- Robin Padilla, President of the Partido Demokratiko Pilipino (2024–present), Member of the Philippine Senate (2022–present), Chair of the Senate Constitutional Amendments and Revision of Codes Committee (2022–present), Chair of the Senate Cultural Communities and Muslim Affairs Committee (2022–present), Chair of the Senate Public Information and Mass Media Committee (2022–present), and Executive Vice President of Partido Demokratiko Pilipino (2022–2023) (Partido Demokratiko Pilipino)
- Artur Pawlowski, Leader of the Solidarity Movement of Alberta (2023–present) and Leader of the Independence Party of Alberta (2022–2023) (Solidarity Movement of Alberta)
- Florian Philippot, President of The Patriots (2017–present), Member of the European Parliament for East France (2014–2019), and Vice President of the National Front (2012–2017) (The Patriots)
- Lyle Shelton, National Director of the Family First Party (2022–present) and Councillor of the City of Toowoomba (2000–2006) (Family First Party)
- László Toroczkai, President of Our Homeland Movement (2018–present), Member of the Hungarian National Assembly (2022–present) and Mayor of Ásotthalom (2013–2022) (Our Homeland Movement)
- Slavi Trifonov, President of There is Such a People (2020–present) and Director of Communications for Europe of Freedom and Direct Democracy (2009-2019) and Member of the Bulgarian National Assembly (2020–2024) (There is Such a People)
- Tom Van Grieken, Leader of Vlaams Belang (2014–present), Member of the Belgian Chamber of Representatives (2019–present) and Member of the Flemish Parliament (2014-2019) (Vlaams Belang)
- Simen Velle, Chairperson of the Progress Party's Youth (2022–present) (Progress Party)
- André Ventura, President of Chega (2019–present), Member of the Portuguese Assembly of the Republic for Lisbon (2019–present), Member of the Portuguese Council of State (2024–present), Member of the Moura Municipal Assembly (2021–present), and Member of the Loures City Council (2017–2018) (Chega)
- Kyriakos Velopoulos, President of the Greek Solution, Member of the Hellenic Parliament for Larissa (2019-present) and Thessaloniki B (2007-2012), and Member of the European Parliament for Greece (2019) ((Greek Solution)
- Alice Weidel, Leader of the Alternative for Germany (2022–present), Member of the German Bundestag for Baden-Württemberg (2017–present) and Leader of the Opposition (2017–2021) (Alternative for Germany)
- Geert Wilders, Leader of Party for Freedom (2006–present), Member of the Dutch House of Representatives (1998–2002, 2002–present) (Party for Freedom)
- Remigijus Žemaitaitis, Leader of Dawn of Nemunas (2023–present), Leader of Freedom and Justice (2020–2023), Leader of Order and Justice (2016–2020), Member of the Lithuanian Seimas (2009–present) (Dawn of Nemunas)
- Éric Zemmour, President of the Reconquête (2021–present) (Reconquête)

=== Former ===
- Gerald Grosz, Member of the Austrian National Council (2009–2013), Leader of the Alliance for the Future of Austria (2013–2015), and Independent candidate for President of Austria in 2022 (Independent)
- Hary Tanoesoedibjo, General Chairman of the Perindo Party (2015–2024), Indonesian media mogul, founder and president director of MNC Asia Holding (Perindo)
- Sajid Tarar, businessman and founder of American Muslims for Trump

== Members of national and supranational parliaments ==
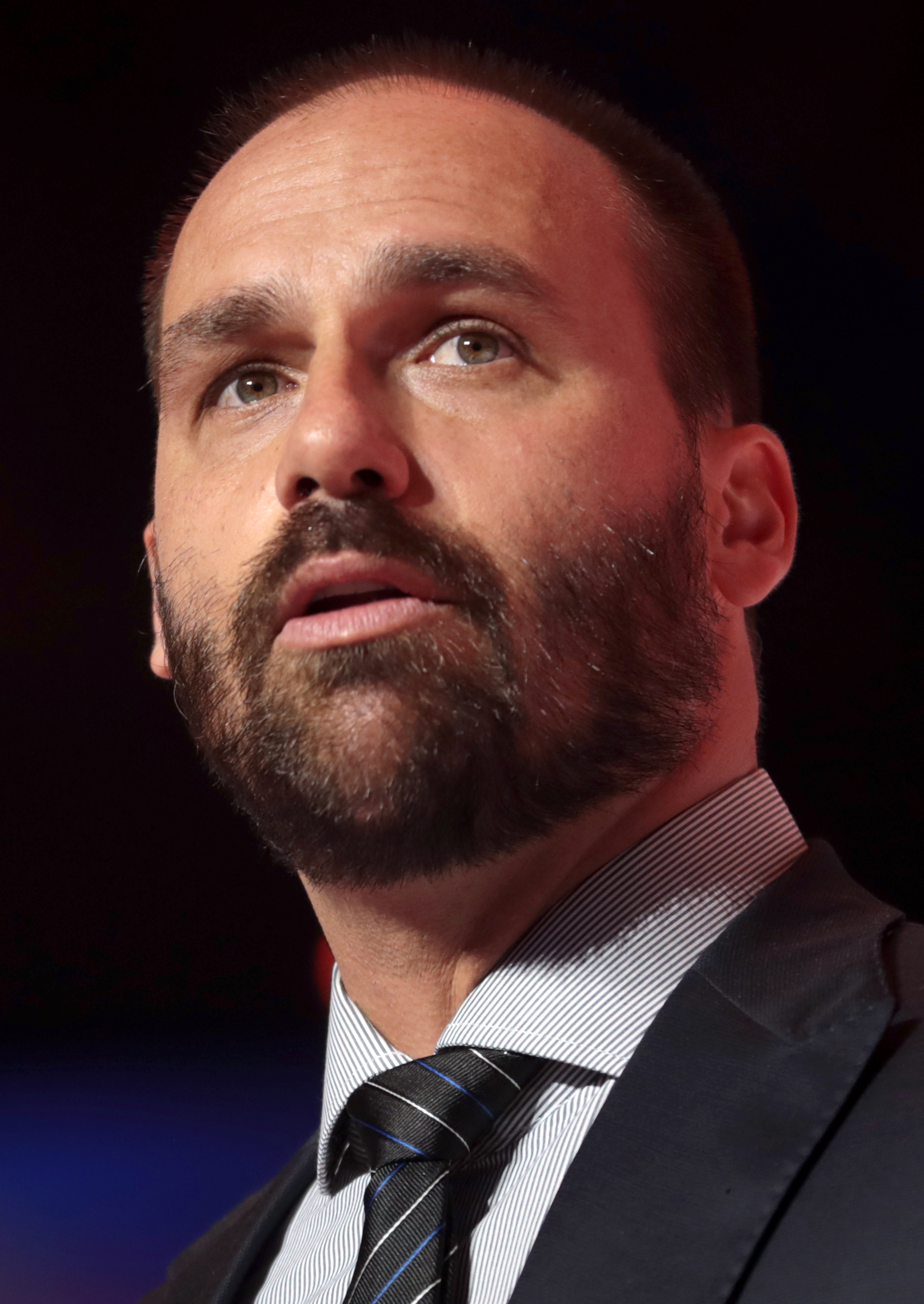
Eduardo Bolsonaro

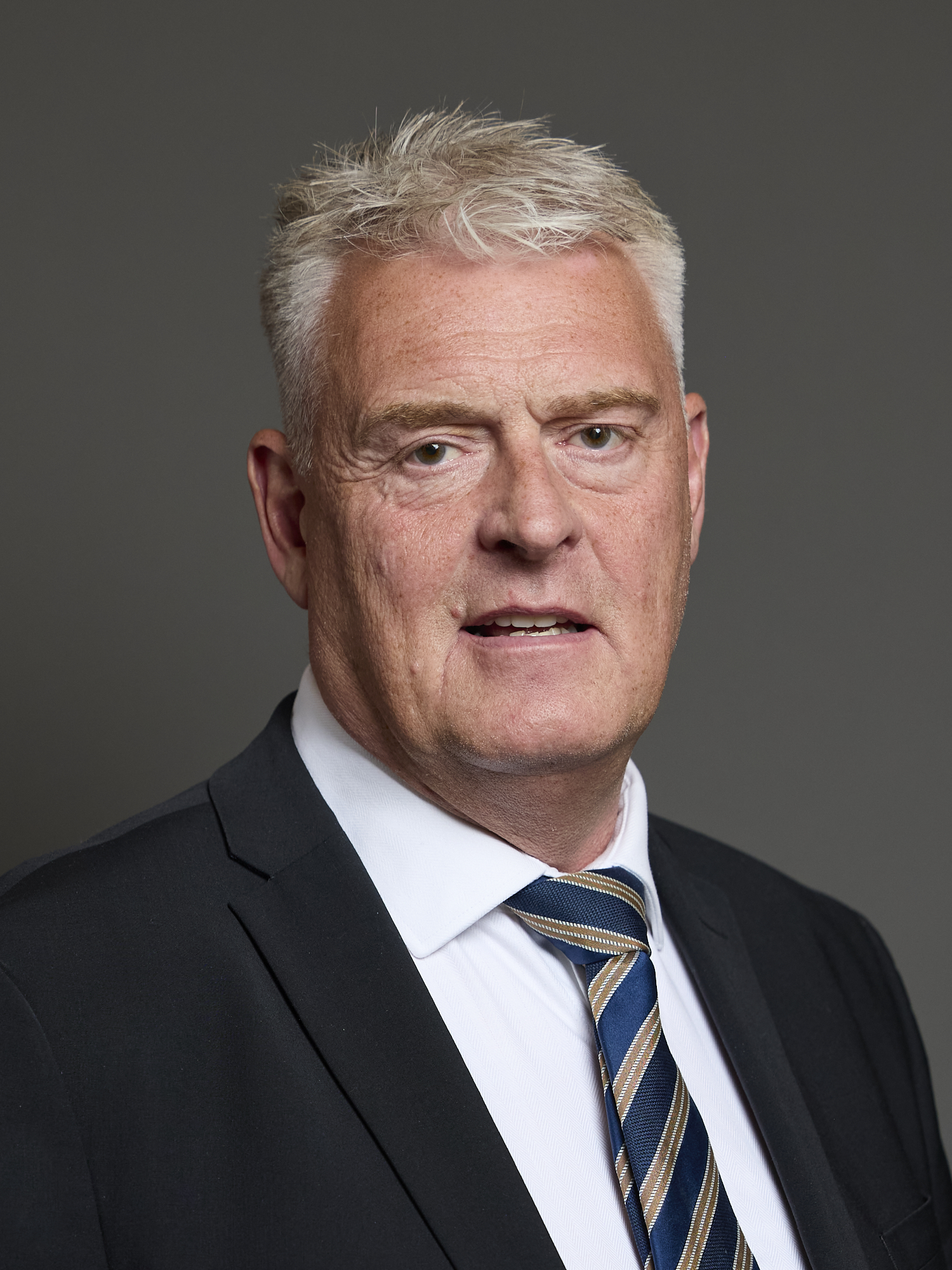
Lee Anderson

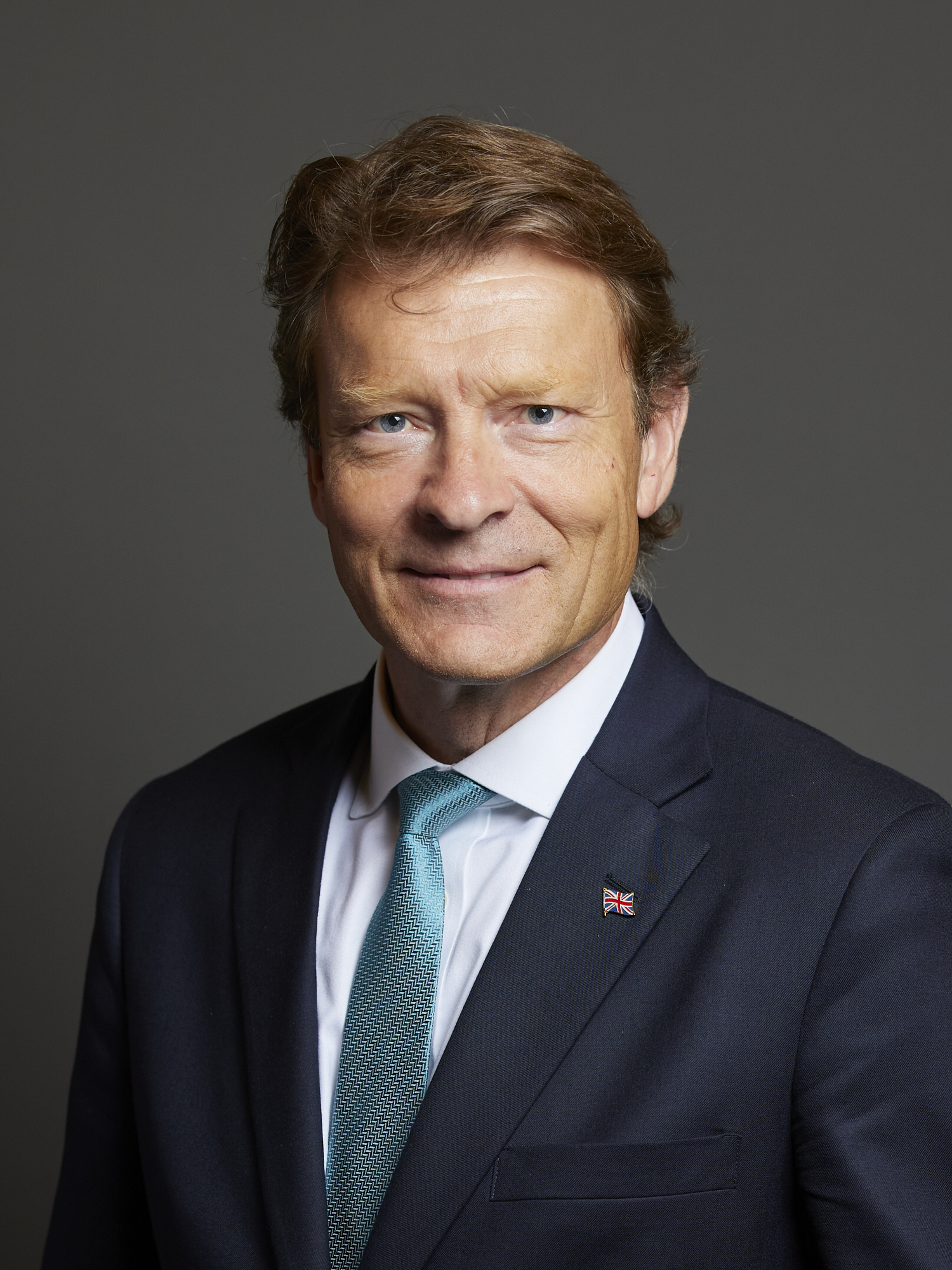
Richard Tice

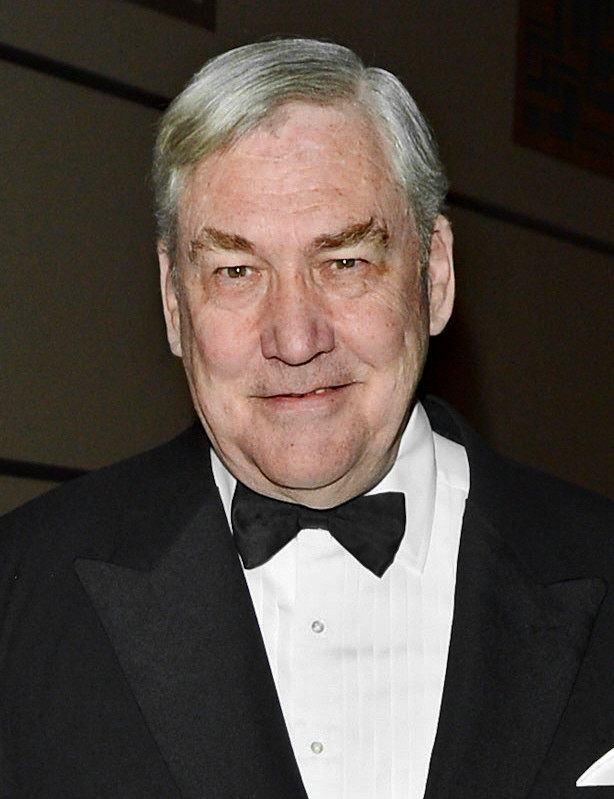
Conrad Black

=== Current ===
==== Upper chambers ====
===== Australia =====
- Alex Antic, Australian Senator for South Australia (2019–present) (Liberal Party of Australia)
- Ralph Babet, Australian Senator for Victoria (2022–present) (United Australia Party)
- Malcolm Roberts, Australian Senator for Queensland (2016–2017, 2019–present) (Pauline Hanson's One Nation)

===== Brazil =====
- Flávio Bolsonaro, Brazilian Senator for Rio de Janeiro (2019–present) and State Deputy of Rio de Janeiro (2003–2019) (Liberal Party)

===== Colombia =====
- María Fernanda Cabal, Colombian Senator (2018–present), Member of the Colombian Chamber of Representatives for Capital District (2014–2018) (Democratic Centre)

===== European Union =====
- Christine Anderson, Member of the European Parliament for Germany (2024–present) (Alternative for Germany)
- Stephen Nikola Bartulica, Member of the European Parliament for Croatia (2024–present) and Member of the Sabor (2020-2024) (DOMiNO)
- Ľuboš Blaha, Member of the European Parliament for Slovakia (2024–present), Deputy Speaker of the National Council of Slovakia (2023–2024), and Member of the National Council of Slovakia (2012–2024) (Direction – Social Democracy)
- Nicolas Bay, Member of the European Parliament for France (2014–present), Executive Vice President of Reconquête (2022-2024), Member of the Regional Council of Normandy (2016-present), General Secretary of the National Rally (2014-2017), and Member of the Municipal Council of Elbeuf (2014-2015) (Identity–Liberties)
- Anna Bryłka, Member of the European Parliament for Greater Poland (2024–present) (National Movement)
- Jorge Buxadé, Member of the European Parliament for Spain (2019–present) and Co-chairman of the European Conservatives and Reformists Group (2019–2024) (Vox)
- Susanna Ceccardi, Member of the European Parliament for Central Italy (2019–present) and Mayor of Cascina (2016–2019) (Lega)
- António Tânger Corrêa, Member of the European Parliament for Portugal (2024–present), Vice President of Chega (2020-present), Ambassador of Portugal to Qatar (2015-2018), Ambassador of Portugal to Egypt (2012-2015), Ambassador of Portugal to Lithuania (2005-2008), Portugal Ceneral Consul in Rio De Janeiro (2003-2005), Ambassador of Portugal to Israel (2001-2003), Ambassador of Portugal to Serbia and Montenegro (1999-2001), Portugal Ceneral Consul in Goa (1993-1996), and Portugal Ceneral Consul in Toronto (1984-1986) (Chega)
- Tamás Deutsch, Member of the European Parliament for Hungary (2009–present) and Member of the National Assembly (1990-2009) (Fidesz)
- Ondřej Dostál, Member of the European Parliament for Czech Republic (2024–present)
- Siegbert Droese, Member of the European Parliament for Germany (2019–present) and Member of the Bundestag for Leipzig II (2017–2021) (Alternative for Germany)
- Carlo Fidanza, Member of the European Parliament for North-West Italy (2009–2014, 2019–present), and Member of the Italian Chamber of Deputies for Lombardy 1 (2018–2019) (Brothers of Italy)
- Virginie Joron, Member of the European Parliament for France (2019–present) and Member of the Regional Council of Grand Est for Haut-Rhin (2016–2021) (National Rally)
- Beata Kempa, Member of the European Parliament for Lower Silesian and Opole (2019–present), Chief of the Chancellery, and Member of the Sejm for Wrocław (2005-2011, 2015-2019) and Kielce (2011-2015-present) (Sovereign Poland)
- Sarah Knafo, Member of the European Parliament for France (2024–present) and Member of the Cour des Comptes (Reconquête)
- Ondřej Knotek, Member of the European Parliament for Czech Republic (2019–present) (ANO)
- Tomáš Kubín, Member of the European Parliament for Czech Republic (2024–present) (ANO 2011)
- Maximilian Krah, Member of the European Parliament for Germany (2019–present) (Alternative for Germany)
- András László, Member of the European Parliament for Hungary (2024–present) (Fidesz)
- Nicola Procaccini, Member of the European Parliament for Central Italy (2019–present) and co-chair of the European Conservatives and Reformists group (2019–present) (Brothers of Italy)
- Silvia Sardone, Member of the European Parliament for North-West Italy (2019–present) (Lega Nord)
- Dominik Tarczyński, Member of the European Parliament for Lesser Poland and Świętokrzyskie (2020–present) and Member of the Polish Sejm (2015–2020) (Law and Justice)
- Hermann Tertsch, Member of the European Parliament for Spain (2019–present) (Vox)
- Filip Turek, Member of the European Parliament for Czech Republic (2024–present) (Přísaha and Motorists)
- Tom Vandendriessche, Member of the European Parliament for Flanders (2019–present) (Vlaams Belang)
- Harald Vilimsky, Member of the European Parliament for Austria (2014–present) (Freedom Party of Austria)
- Tomáš Zdechovský, Member of the European Parliament for Czech Republic (2024–present) (KDU-ČSL)
- Anna Zalewska, Member of the European Parliament for Lower Silesian and Opole (2019–present)) and Minister of National Education (2015-2019) (Law and Justice)

===== Georgia =====
- Irakli Zarkua, Member of the Georgian Parliament (2020–present) (Georgian Dream)

==== Hungary ====
- Zsolt Németh, Member of the Hungarian National Assembly (1990-present) (Fidesz)

===== Peru =====
- Patricia Chirinos, Member of the Peruvian Congress for Callao (2021–present) (Go On Country - Social Integration Party)

===== Philippines =====
- Ronald de la Rosa, Member of the Philippine Senate (2019–present), Chair of the Senate Public Order and Dangerous Drugs Committee (2019–present), Chair of the Senate Peace, Unification and Reconciliation Committee (2019), Director-General of the Bureau of Corrections (2018), Chief of the Philippine National Police (2016–2018), and City Director of the Davao City Police (2012–2013) (Partido Demokratiko Pilipino)
- Migz Zubiri, Member of the Philippine Senate (2007–2011, 2016–present), President of the Senate of the Philippines (2022–2024), President pro tempore of the Senate of the Philippines (2022), Majority Leader in the Philippine Senate (2008–2010, 2018–2022), Chair of the Senate Committee on Cooperatives (2016–2022), Chair of the Senate Committee on Trade, Commerce and Entrepreneurship (2016–2018) and Member of the House of Representatives of the Philippines for Bukidnon's 3rd congressional district (Independent)

===== Russia =====
- Aleksey Pushkov, Russian Federation Senator for Perm Krai (2016–present), Chairman of the Russian Committee on International Affairs of the State Duma (2011–2016), and Deputy of the Russian State Duma (2011–2016) (United Russia)

==== Slovakia ====
- Dušan Jarjabek, member of the National Council (1998–present) (Direction – Social Democracy)

===== United Kingdom =====
- Jacqueline Foster, Member of the UK House of Lords Lord Temporal (2021–present), Deputy Leader of the Conservative MEPs in the European Parliament (2013–2019), and Member of the European Parliament for North West England (1999–2004, 2009–2019) (Conservative)

==== Lower chambers ====
===== Albania =====
- Myslim Murrizi, Member of the Albanian Parliament (2017–present) (Albanian Democratic Movement)

===== Belgium =====
- Theo Francken, Member of the Belgian Chamber of Representatives (2010–present) and Secretary of State for Asylum, Migration and Administrative Simplification of Belgium (2014–2018) (New Flemish Alliance)

===== Brazil =====
- Eduardo Bolsonaro, Member of the Brazilian Chamber of Deputies for São Paulo (2015–present) (Liberal Party)
- Nikolas Ferreira, Member of the Brazilian Chamber of Deputies for Minas Gerais (2023–present) (Liberal Party)
- Mário Frias, Member of the Brazilian Chamber of Deputies for São Paulo (2023–present) (Liberal Party)
- Gustavo Gayer, Member of the Brazilian Chamber of Deputies for Goiás (2023–present) (Liberal Party)
- Bibo Nunes, Member of the Brazilian Chamber of Deputies for Rio Grande do Sul (2019–present) (Liberal Party)
- Luiz Philippe of Orléans-Braganza, Member of the Brazilian Chamber of Deputies for São Paulo (2019–present) (Liberal Party)

===== Czech Republic =====
- Aleš Juchelka, Member of the Czech Chamber of Deputies (2021–present) (ANO 2011)
- Marek Benda, Member of the Czech Chamber of Deputies (2004–present) (ODS)
- Stanislav Blaha, Member of the Czech Chamber of Deputies (2017–present) (ODS)
- Karel Haas, Member of the Czech Chamber of Deputies (2021–present) (ODS)
- Jiří Kobza, Member of the Czech Chamber of Deputies (2017–present) (SPD)
- Karel Krejza, Member of the Czech Chamber of Deputies (2017–present) (ODS)
- Ivana Mádlová, Member of the Czech Chamber of Deputies (2021–present) (ANO 2011)
- Jiří Mašek, Member of the Czech Chamber of Deputies (2017–present) (ANO 2011)
- Radek Rozvoral, Member of the Czech Chamber of Deputies (2017–present) (SPD)
- Pavel Růžička, Member of the Czech Chamber of Deputies (2017–present) (ANO 2011)
- Lucie Šafránková, Member of the Czech Chamber of Deputies (2017–present) (SPD)

===== Germany =====
- Beatrix von Storch, Member of the German Bundestag for Berlin (2017–present) and Member of the European Parliament for Germany (2014–2017) (Alternative for Germany)
- Matthias Moosdorf, Member of the German Bundestag for Zwickau (2021–present) (Alternative for Germany)

===== Netherlands =====
- Dennis Ram, Member of the Dutch House of Representatives (2023–present), Municipal Councillor of Groningen (2022–2023), and Member of the Provincial Council of Groningen (2011–2023) (Party for Freedom)
- Pepijn van Houwelingen, Member of the Dutch House of Representatives (2021–2023, 2024–present) (Forum for Democracy)

===== Poland =====
- Mariusz Gosek, Member of the Sejm (2020-present) (Law and Justice)
- Paweł Hreniak, Member of the Sejm (2019-present) (Law and Justice)
- Kacper Płażyński, Member of the Sejm for Gdańsk (2019-present) (Law and Justice)

===== Romania =====
- Marian-Gheorghe Cucșa, Member of the Romanian Chamber of Deputies (2016–present) (Alliance of Liberals and Democrats)

===== Russia =====
- Yevgeny Popov, Member of the Russian State Duma for Moscow (2021–present) (United Russia)

===== United Kingdom =====
- Lee Anderson, Member of the UK Parliament for Ashfield (2019–present) (Reform UK)
- Richard Tice, Member of the UK Parliament for Boston and Skegness (2024–present) and Member of the European Parliament for East of England (2019–2020) (Reform UK)

==== Former ====
- Cory Bernardi, Australian Senator for South Australia (2006–2020) (Independent)
- Conrad Black, Member of the UK House of Lords Lord Temporal (2002–2024) (Independent)
- Paul Girvan, Member of the UK Parliament for South Antrim (2017–2024), Member of the Northern Ireland Assembly for South Antrim (2003–2007, 2010–2017), and Member of Newtownabbey Borough Council for Ballyclare (1997–2014) (Democratic Unionist Party)
- Martin Henriksen, Member of the Folketing for Greater Copenhagen, (2005-2019), (Danish People's Party), and current leader of the New Right

== Local officials ==
=== Current ===
- Carlos Bolsonaro, Councillor of Rio de Janeiro (2001–present) (Liberal Party)
- Viktor Bout, Member of the Legislative Assembly of Ulyanovsk Oblast (2023–present) (Liberal Democratic Party of Russia)
- Simon Ekpa, Member of the Lahti Public Transport Board (2020–present) (National Coalition Party)
- Himanta Biswa Sarma, Chief Minister of Assam (2021–present), Member of the Assam Legislative Assembly (2001–present), Founder-Convener of the NEDA (2016–present), and Leader of the House, Assam Legislative Assembly (2021–present) (Bharatiya Janata Party)
- Jörg Urban, Member of the Landtag of Saxony (2014–present), Leader of the Alternative for Germany in the Landtag of Saxony (2017-present), Leader of the Alternative for Germany in Saxony (2017-present), and Leader of the Opposition in the Landtag of Saxony (Alternative for Germany)

=== Former ===
- Vijay Jolly, Member of the Delhi Legislative Assembly (2003–2008) for Saket (Bharatiya Janata Party)

== Non-political ==
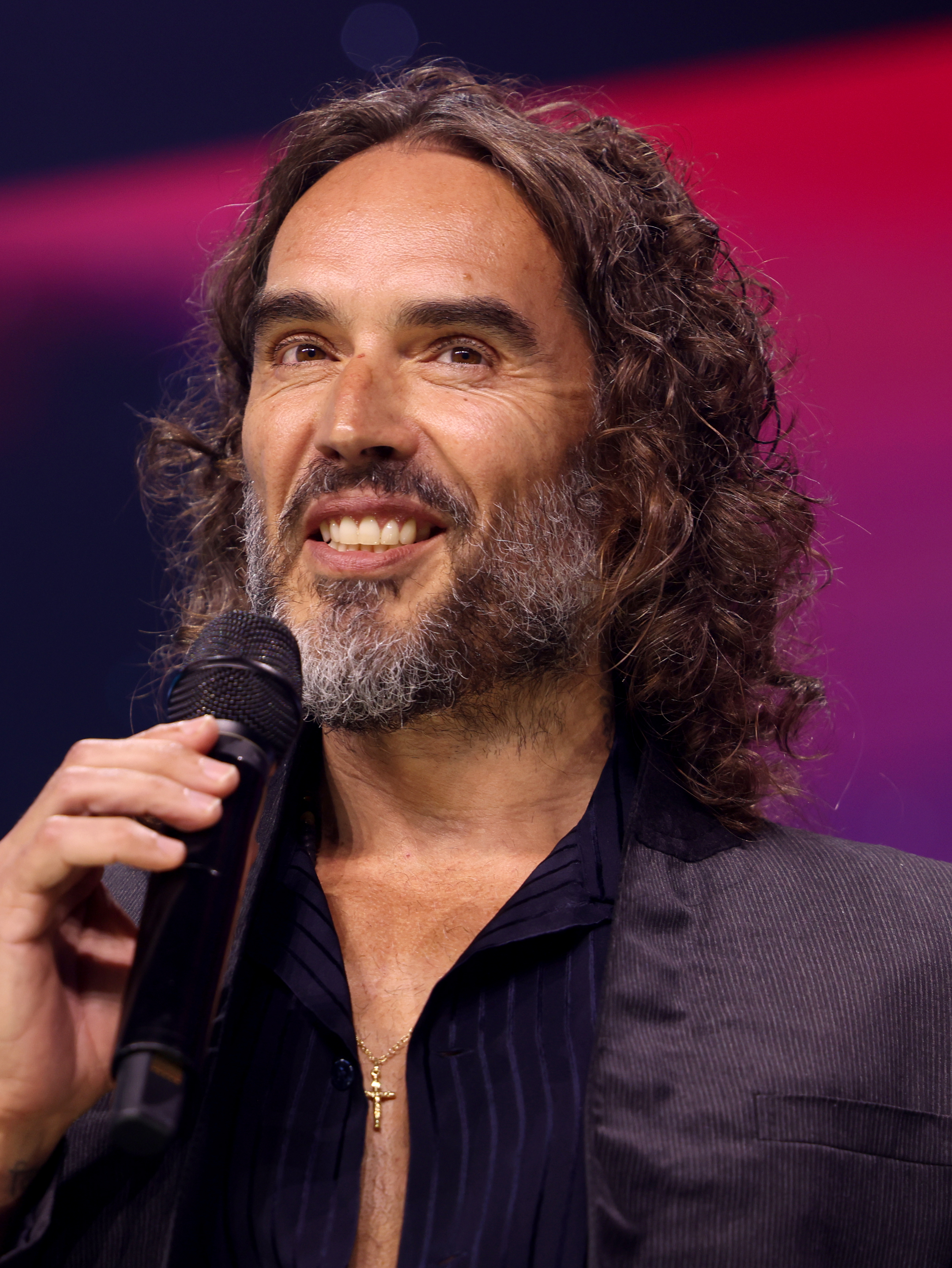
Russell Brand

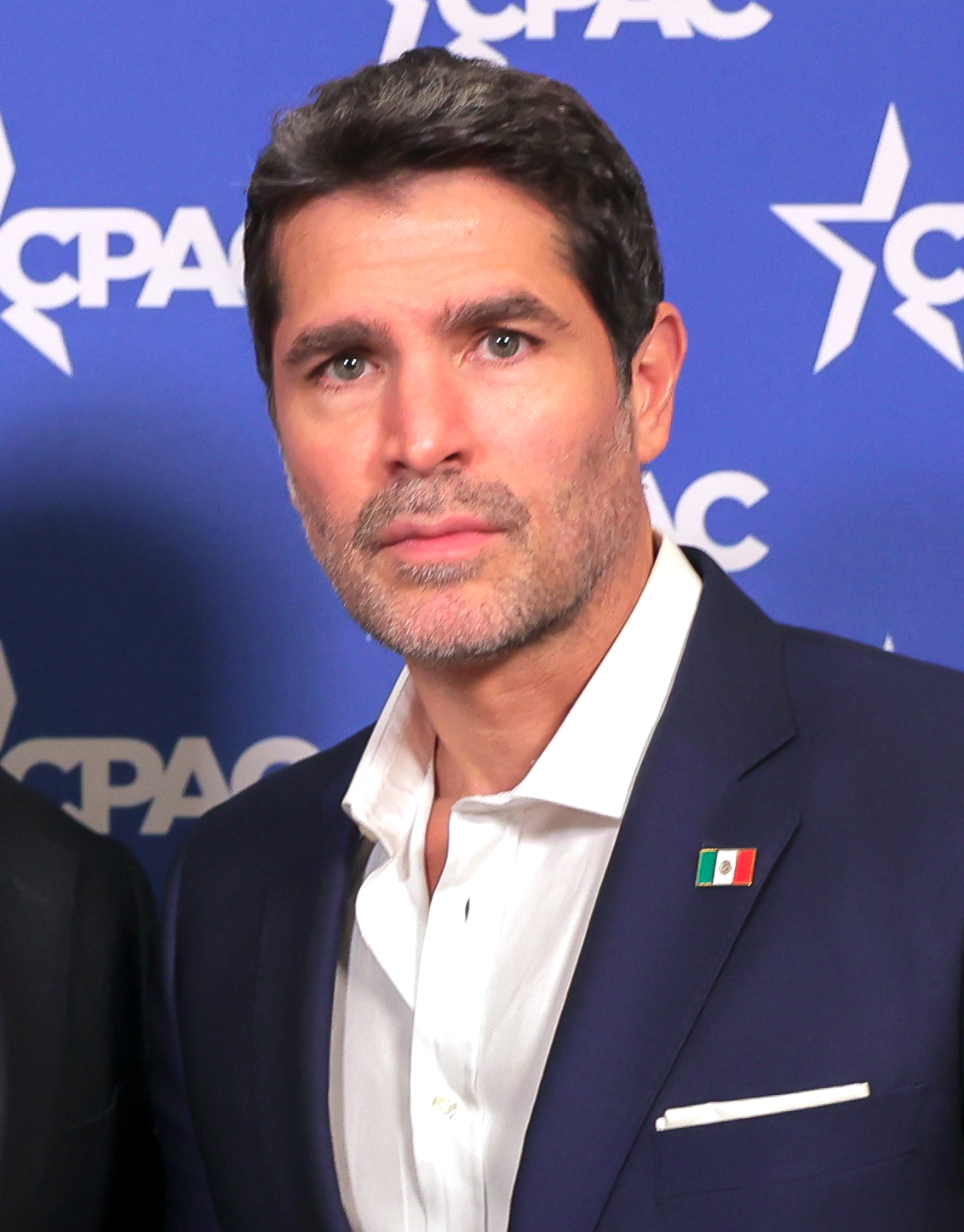
Eduardo Verástegui

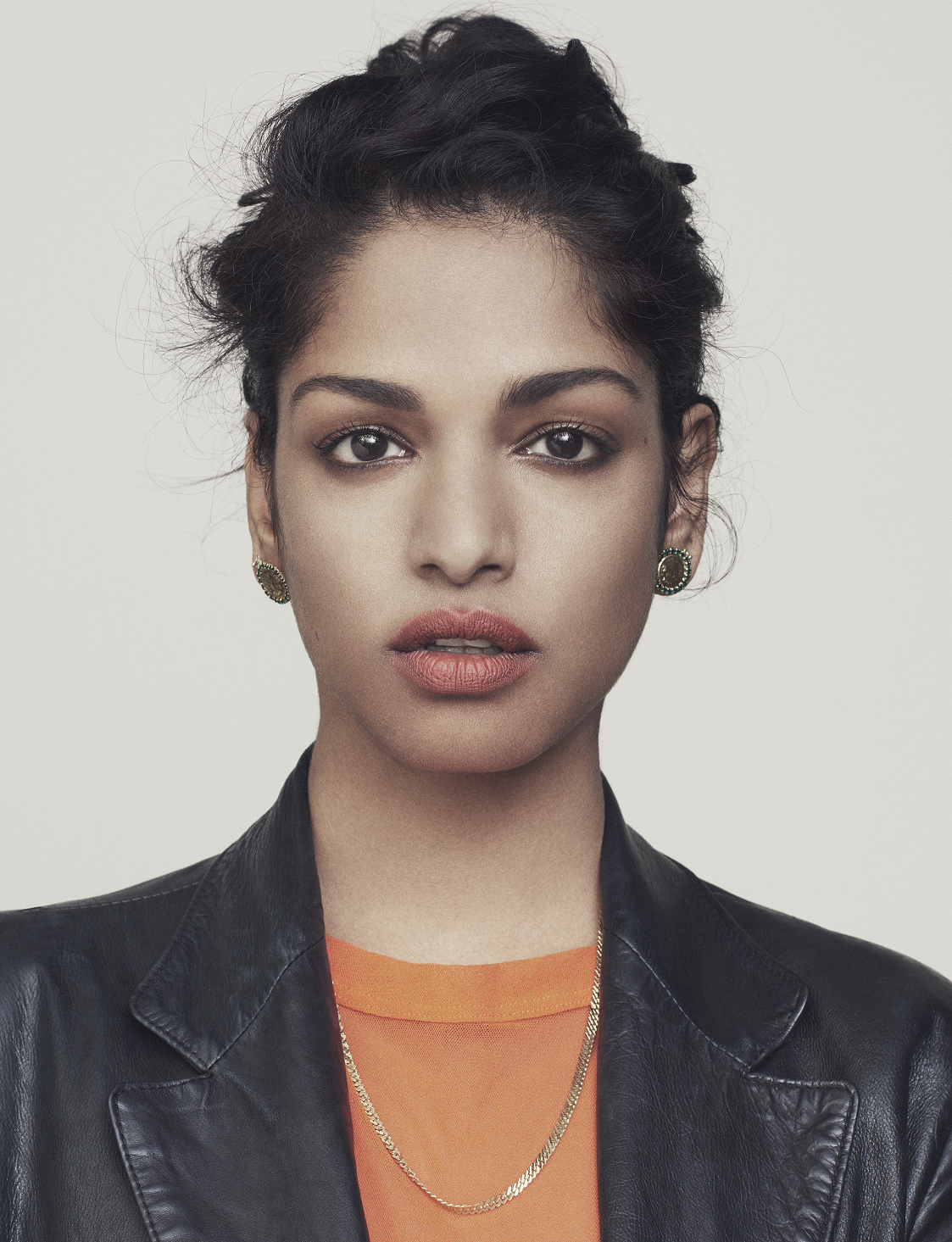
M.I.A.

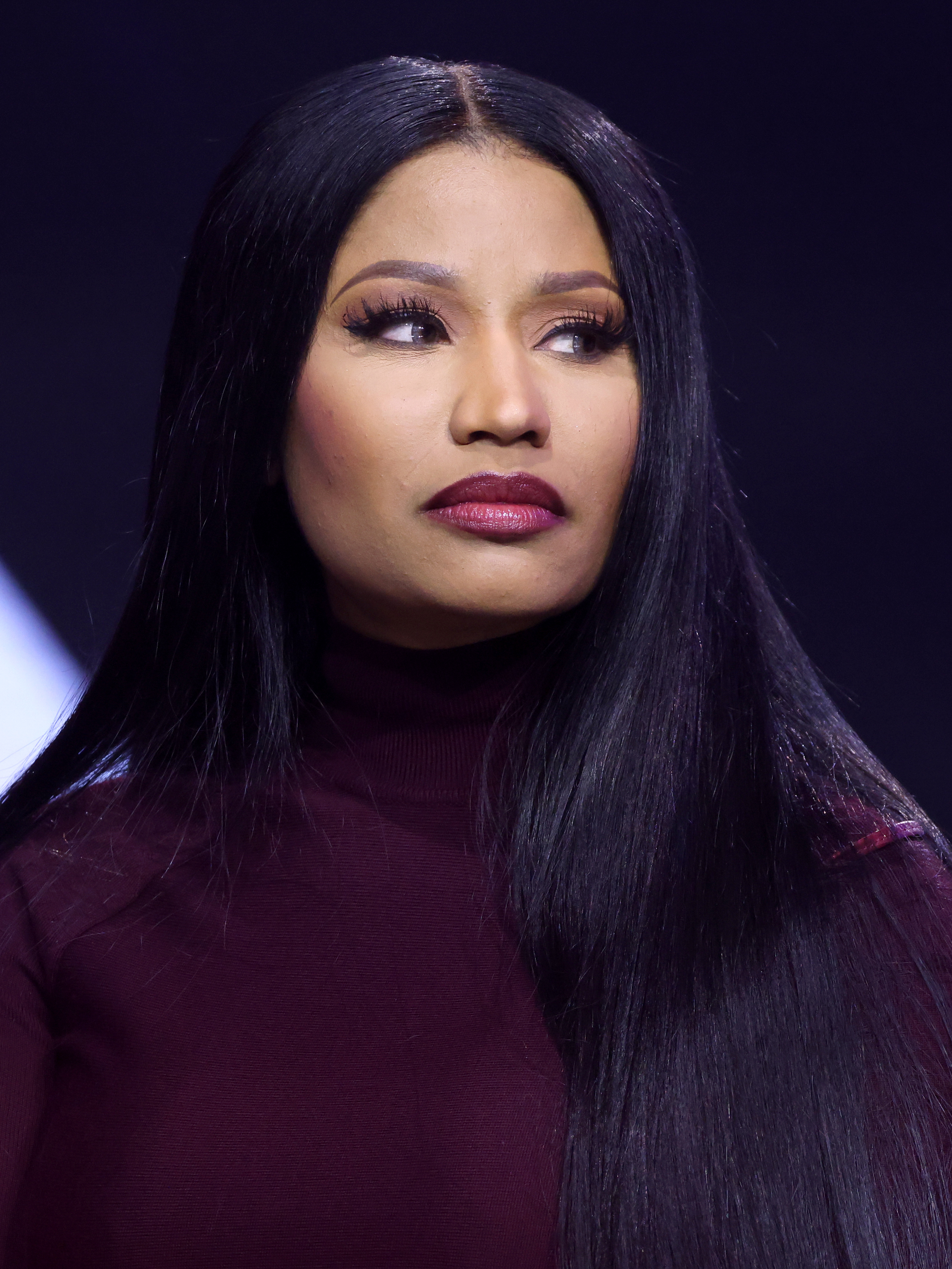
Nicki Minaj

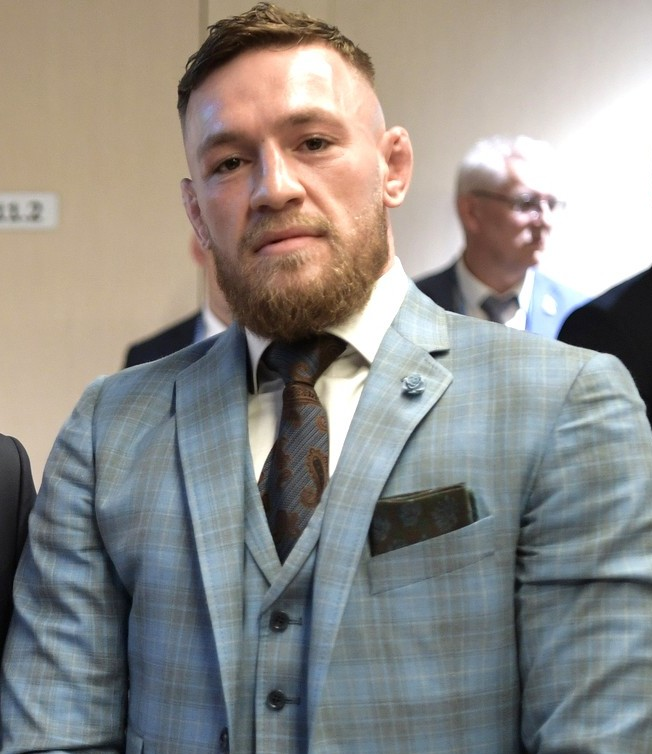
Conor McGregor

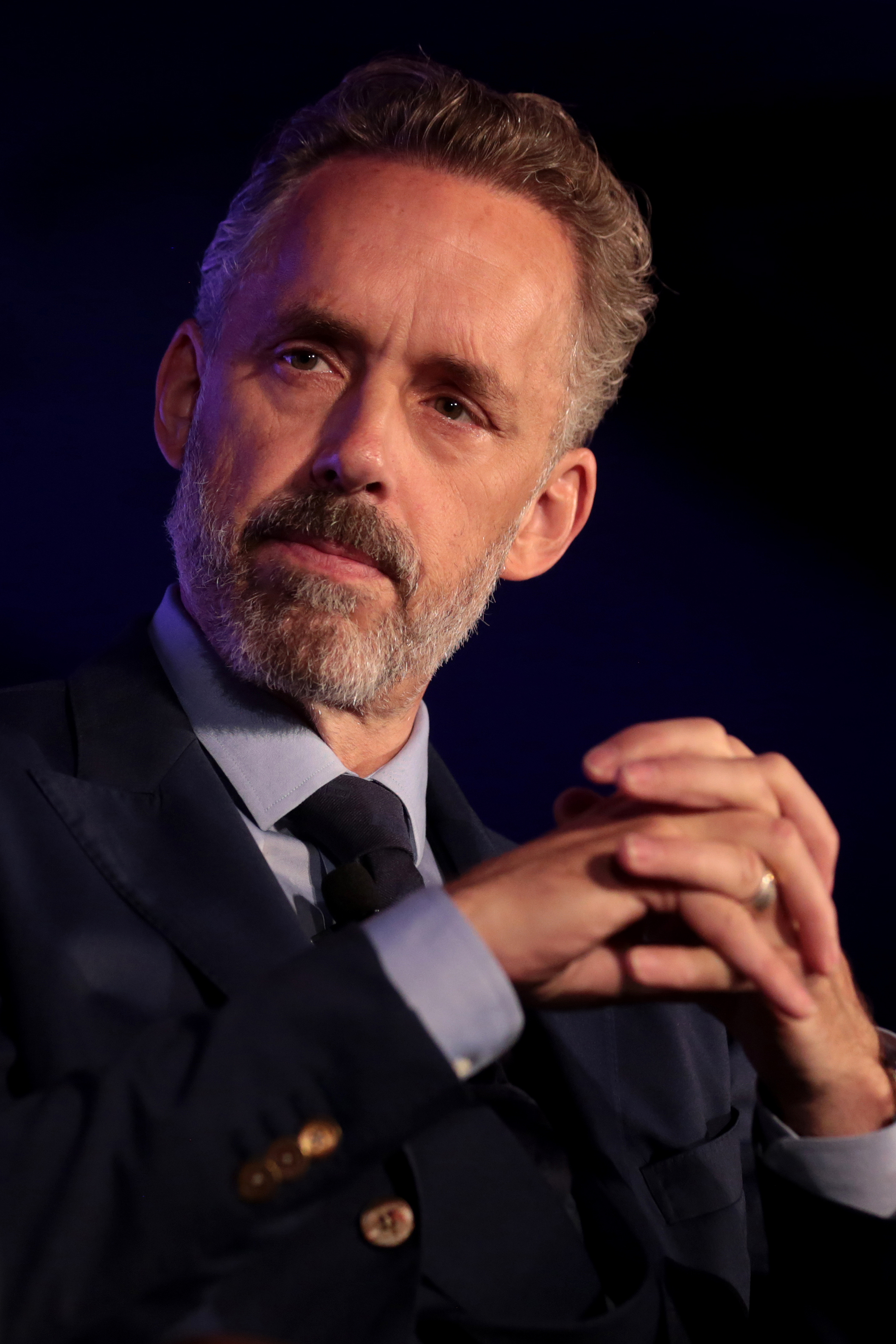
Jordan Peterson

=== Business leaders ===
- Nick Candy, British luxury property developer
- Ryan Cohen, Canadian chairman and CEO of GameStop and co-founder of Chewy
- Johnnie To, Chinese filmmaker

=== Actors ===
- Russell Brand, English actor and comedian (Note: previously endorsed Robert F. Kennedy Jr.)
- Pedro Moreno, Cuban actor
- Lila Morillo, Venezuelan actress
- Paty Navidad, Mexican actress
- Oleksandra Nikolayenko, Ukrainian actress
- Liliana Rodriguez, Venezuelan actress
- Carolina Tejera, Venezuela actress
- Holly Valance, Australian actress and singer
- Jean-Claude Van Damme, Belgian Actor
- Eduardo Verástegui, Mexican actor and Independent candidate for Mexican president in 2024

=== Television personalities ===
- Pete Evans, Australian television chef
- Ant Middleton, English television personality
- Kevin O'Leary, Canadian television personality and businessman
- Mike Parry, British former journalist, radio presenter, and broadcaster
- Olga Skabeyeva, Russian television presenter, political commentator, and propagandist
- Milo Yiannopoulos, British far-right political commentator

=== Musicians ===
- Dax, Canadian rapper
- Kerry Katona, British singer, columnist, and former member of Atomic Kitten
- M.I.A., British rapper (Note: previously endorsed Robert F. Kennedy Jr.)
- Tom MacDonald, Canadian rapper
- Hayley Mary, Australian singer for The Jezabels
- Nicki Minaj, Trinidadian rapper
- Nacho, Venezuelan singer and rapper
- Alex Terrible, Russian lead vocalist of Slaughter to Prevail

=== Writers ===
- Michel Houellebecq, French writer

=== Sports figures ===
- Ali Abdelaziz, Egyptian manager and former professional mixed martial artist
- Israel Adesanya, Nigerian-New Zealander professional mixed martial artist
- Amber Balcaen, Canadian racing driver
- Joey Barton, British former Premier League player
- Khamzat Chimaev, Russian-Emirati professional mixed martial artist
- Derek Chisora, British professional boxer
- Paulo Costa, Brazilian professional mixed martial artist
- Max Domi, Canadian professional ice hockey player
- Bernie Ecclestone, British former professional racing driver and former CEO of the Formula One Group
- Jason Ellis, Australian professional skateboarder and podcast host
- Ernie Els, South African professional golfer
- María Gabriela Franco, Venezuelan Olympic sport shooter
- Wayne Gretzky, Canadian professional ice hockey player
- Charley Hull, British professional golfer
- Gianni Infantino, Swiss-Italian-Lebanese president of FIFA
- Charles Jourdain, Canadian professional mixed martial artist
- Evander Kane, Canadian professional ice hockey player
- Héctor Lombard, Cuban-Australian professional mixed martial artist
- Conor McGregor, Irish professional mixed martial artist
- Uroš Medić, Serbian professional mixed martial artist
- Bobby Orr, Canadian former professional ice hockey player
- Gary Player, South African former professional golfer
- Chad Reed, Australian former motocross rider
- George Russell, British racing driver
- Adam Scott, Australian professional golfer
- Teemu Selänne, Finnish former NHL right winger
- Ilia Topuria, Georgian-Spanish martial artist
- Val Venis, Canadian former professional wrestler
- Marlon Vera, Ecuadorian professional mixed martial artist

=== Religious figures ===
- Pini Dunner, British Orthodox rabbi
- Mari Emmanuel, Australian Assyrian Eastern Christian prelate
- David Lau, Israeli Ashkenazi chief rabbi of Israel (2013–2024)
- Carlo Maria Viganò, Italian excommunicated Catholic archbishop and former Vatican ambassador to the United States

=== Academic figures and scholars ===
- Noah Carl, British sociologist
- Nick Land, British philosopher
- Jordan Peterson, Canadian psychologist and professor emeritus at the University of Toronto

=== Online personalities ===
- Jeremy Fragrance, German-Polish social media influencer
- xQc, Canadian Twitch streamer
- Vitaly Zdorovetskiy, Russian YouTuber and online streamer

=== Activists ===
- Jamie Bryson, Northern Irish loyalist activist
- Bianca Censori, Australian architect and model
- Giuseppe Cruciani, Italian radio personality and journalist
- Raheem Kassam, British editor-in-chief for The National Pulse
- Lara Logan, South African television journalist and war correspondent
- Mohammad Hosseini, Iranian political activist, radio host, and founder and leader of Restart
- Piers Morgan, British journalist and media personality, host of Piers Morgan Uncensored (Note: previously endorsed Ron DeSantis)
- Sima Nan, Chinese television pundit, social commentator, and journalist
- Eva Vlaardingerbroek, Dutch right-wing political commentator and activist

== Organizations ==
=== Political parties ===
==== Supranational ====
- Patriots for Europe

==== National ====
- Independence
- Greek Solution
- Republican Party of Romania
- Resni.ca
- Revival
- Vox

== See also ==
- List of Donald Trump 2024 presidential campaign political endorsements
- List of Kamala Harris 2024 presidential campaign international endorsements
- Foreign interference in the 2024 United States elections
