= Seyed Mohammad Hosseini =

Seyed Mohammad Hosseini is the name of:

- Mohammad Hosseini (footballer)
- Mohammad Hosseini (politician)
- Seyed Mohammad Hosseini (showman)
- Seyed Mohammad Hosseini (protester)
