= Restart (group) =

Iranian opposition group based in California, U.S.

Restart ری‌استارت
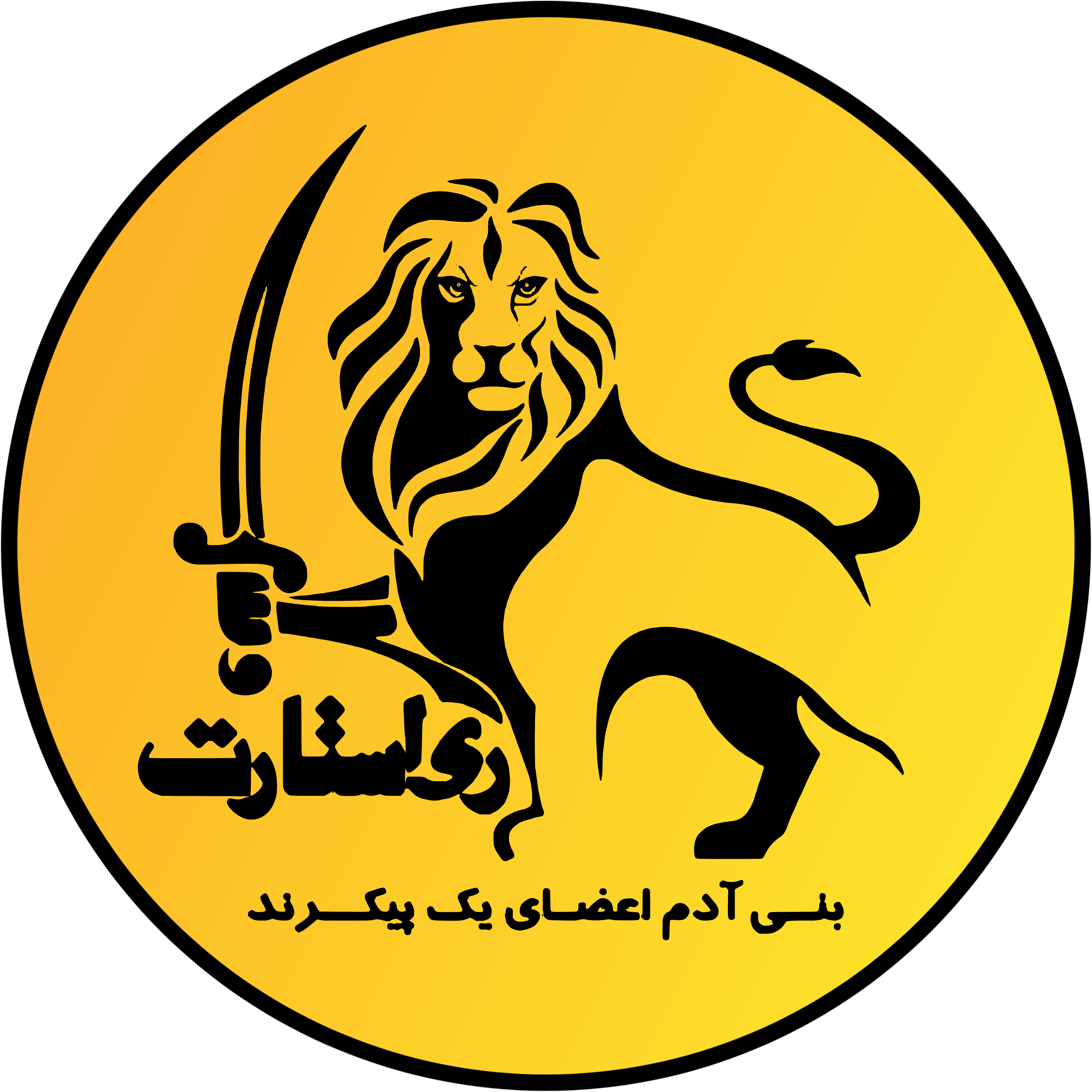
- Leader: Mohammad Hosseini
- Spokesman: Mani Majd
- Founder: Mohammad Hosseini
- Founded: 2016; 10 years ago
- Headquarters: California, U.S.
- Ideology: Iranian nationalism; Right-wing antiglobalism; Anti-Khomeinism; Mysticism (Persian); Trumpism
- Political position: Right-wing
- Religion: Sufism (claimed)
- Colours: Orange; Yellow
- Slogan: Bani Adam

Website
- voiceofrestart.com

Restart (Persian: ری‌استارت) is a California-based right-wing political organization dedicated to regime change in Iran. Led by Mohammad Hosseini, the group and its leader are well known for organizing arson and vandalism, as well as advocating conspiracy theories. Over the past few years, the group has started whitewashing the Iranian Islamic regime by blaming religious minorities—especially Baha'is and Zoroastrians and to some extent Jews—for Iran's misfortunes.

== Etymology ==
The name Restart, is meant for using the computing term with regards to Iran. Accounts associated with the group frequently use #restartIran hashtag on social media. According to the group's leader, the name was chosen in order to make its followers "think in new ways".

== Ideology and platform ==
Restart claims to be a Persian mysticist and Sufi movement advocating the overthrow and replacement of the Islamic Republic with the Persian Empire of Cyrus the Great. Its leader, Mohammad Hosseini, maintains that "violence is the only way to overthrow the Islamic Republic". A new constitution was proposed by the group's leader, with 24 articles including right to keep and bear arms.

They praise U.S. President Donald Trump’s foreign policy towards Iran, and supports American military action against the latter, and offered to fight alongside the U.S. in overthrowing the Iranian government. The group adopted the slogan "Make Iran Great Again" (a play on Trump's "Make America Great Again").

Restart has been compared to QAnon by Ariane Tabatabai, in terms of "conspiracist thinking going global". Among conspiracy theories advocated by the group is that Iran's Supreme Leader Ali Khamenei has died (or went into coma) in 2017 and a double plays his role in public. Hosseini claimed that based on a prediction made by 14th century figure Shah Nimatullah Wali, the Iranian government would collapse in 2018, as it "has been permitted" or "has been ordered", implicitly making a reference to an occult or supernatural authority.

The group has increasingly whitewashed Iran’s Islamic regime by blaming minorities—especially Bahá’ís and Zoroastrians, and Jews—for the country’s problems.

== Vandalism and arson ==
The group instructed its members to throw Molotov cocktails and flammable liquids at banks, ATM machines, mosques, gas stations and government buildings while filming the operation. During Winter 2017, at least 20 videos of property damage incidents were attributed to the group while it claimed many more attacks (30 mosques, 500–600 banks, 200–300 ATMs and 150–180 Basiji bases across the country). On 16 October 2017, Metropolitan Police arrested two for an arson attempt against Embassy of Iran, London. The two had sprayed the word 'Restart' on the door, but were detained before setting the building on fire.

In an interview with Eli Lake, Hosseini said "We started with a color protest ... We told people to spray colors on the walls of buildings that belonged to the Basij ... Then we said there should be a fire protest, They should burn down government mosques and police stations". The reason for getting more violent, according to him was that "When the colors didn’t work that much, I switched to throwing rocks, because they didn’t talk about me. There were thousands of videos showing they threw color, but no news picked it up, so I became more aggressive. I decided to switch to throwing rocks, so that got a little attention but not enough. So I switched to throwing fire at government buildings, Basij banks and mosques that had Basij headquarters there, and banks that are stealing people’s money".

In November 2017, two members of the restart group set the office of Persepolis F.C. in Tehran on fire which injured the security guard. A video of the scene of the fire has been published on social networks, which shows that the arsonist had a companion who filmed him and said that "restart is the only way to save Iran". In January 2018, Hosseini released an audio message, threatening the Islamic Revolutionary Guard Corps for killing its members and their families. In February 2018, an Iranian refugee in Australia initiated his Melbourne–Canberra walk to voice support for Restart. In March 2018, eleven members of the group convicted of destruction of public property and propaganda, were sentenced to imprisonment in Iran.

The group has an extensive presence on the internet. Telegram banned Restart's 100K+ channel (@showman1) in October 2017. The company's CEO Pavel Durov wrote a post, stating that they have asked the owner to stop its "vandalism contest" but after being ignored, they were "left with no other option but to block". Subsequently, mirror accounts were launched on the same app.
