= Sajid Tarar =

Pakistani American businessman and activist

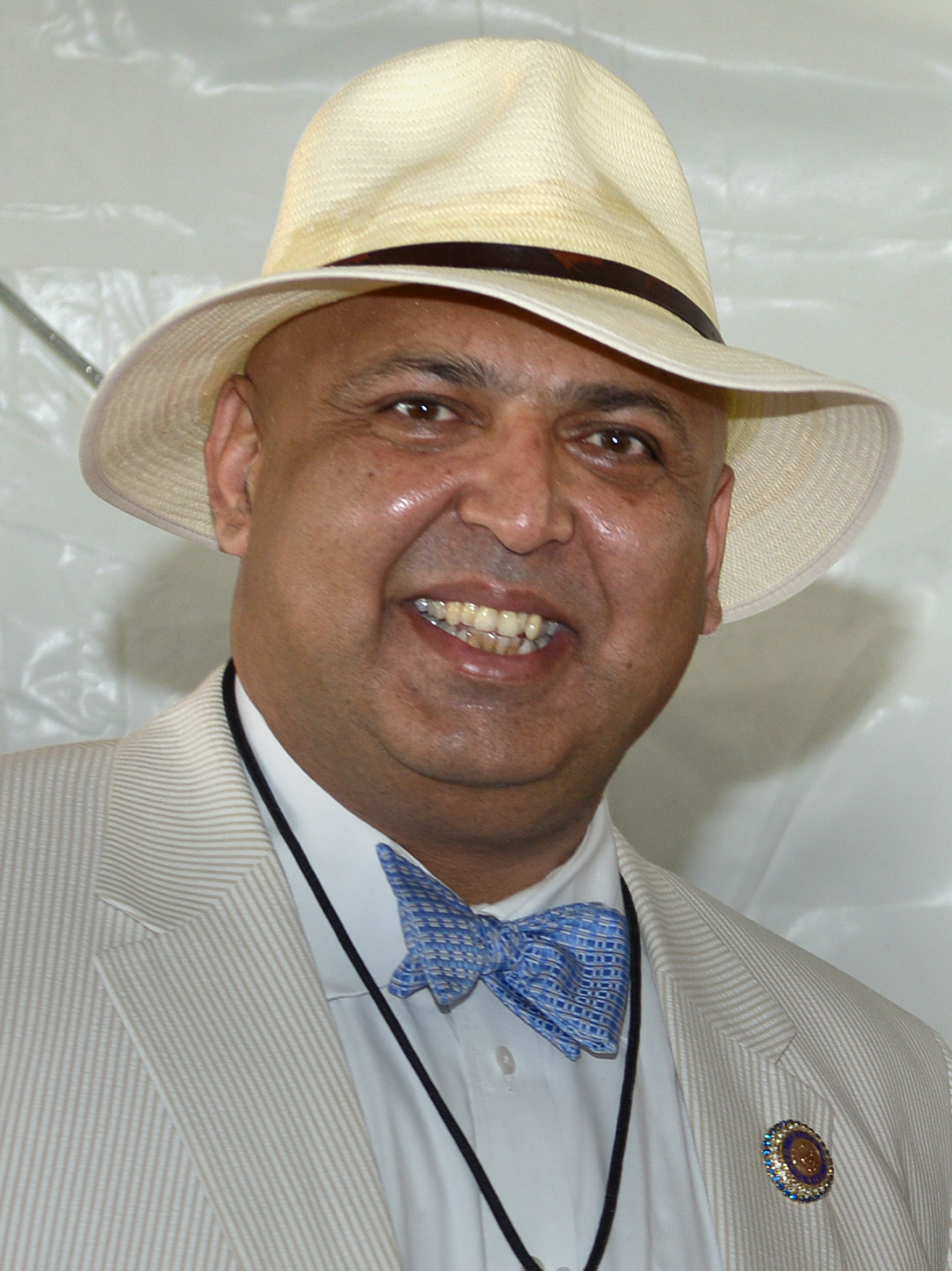
- Tarar at the 2015 Preakness Stakes
- Born: Mandi Bahauddin, Punjab, Pakistan
- Citizenship: United States
- Education: University of Baltimore
- Employer(s): CEO, Center for Social Change
- Organization(s): American Muslims for Trump; National Diversity Coalition for Trump
- Known for: Delivering Islamic prayer at 2016 Republican National Convention
- Political party: Republican
- Movement: Trumpism
- Children: 4

Sajid Tarar is a Pakistani American and Republican activist based in Baltimore. He is the founder of American Muslims for Trump and became known nationally after delivering a benediction at the 2016 Republican National Convention. He is the CEO of non-profit private organization Center for Social Change.

== Early life and career ==
Tarar is originally from Mandi Bahauddin, Punjab, Pakistan. He moved from Pakistan to the United States in the mid-1980s to attend law school, became a U.S. citizen in the 1990s, and later settled outside Baltimore.

After earning his law degree from the Baltimore School of Law, Tarar worked in the finance committee of governors and has also been the president of investment groups.

== Political activity ==
During the 2016 United States presidential election, Tarar founded the pro-Trump group American Muslims for Trump. On July 19, 2016, he delivered the closing prayer on the second day of the Republican National Convention in Cleveland.

After Donald Trump won the 2016 election, Pakistani officials had approached Tarar as part of their outreach to the incoming administration. In January 2017, Tarar was scheduled to recite Surah al-Fatiha at the National Prayer Service held as part of Trump's inauguration weekend. His participation in the service became part of a broader debate among Muslim leaders over whether engagement with Trump created an opportunity to represent Islam publicly or instead legitimized anti-Muslim rhetoric from his campaign.

Tarar has remained active in commentary about Pakistani-American political engagement and Pakistan–United States relations. He has been involved in fundraising and outreach for Trump's presidential campaign while commenting on the role of Pakistani-American voters.
