= Lucie Šafránková =

Czech politician

Member of the Chamber of Deputies
- Incumbent
- Assumed office 21 October 2017
- Constituency: South Moravian Region

Personal details
- Born: 21 May 1987 (age 39) Czechoslovakia
- Party: SPD (2016–)
- Education: Pražská vysoká škola psychosociálních studií

Lucie Šafránková (born 21 May 1987) is a Czech politician and an MP in the Chamber of Deputies for the Freedom and Direct Democracy (SPD).

Šafránková holds a degree in psychology from Prague University. In the 2017 Czech parliamentary election, she was elected to the Chamber of Deputies on second place for the South Moravia constituency. In 2018, she was elected to Brno city council for the SPD.
