= Mohammad Hosseini (broadcaster) =

Iranian television presenter

Seyyed Mohammad Hosseini
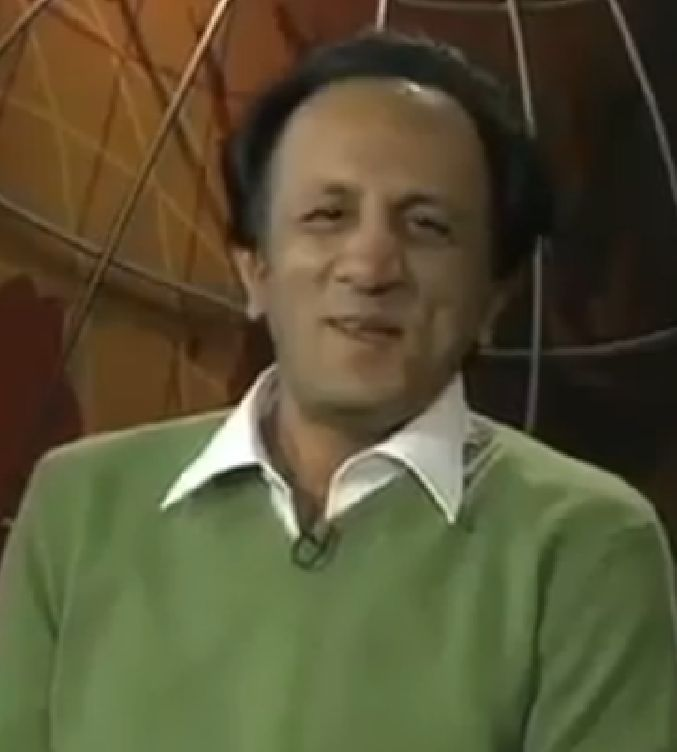
- Born: 4 July 1969 (age 57); Tehran, Imperial State of Iran
- Occupations: Political activist, showman, radio host
- Years active: 1994–present
- Political party: Restart
- Website: http://www.voiceofrestart.com

Seyyed Mohammad Hosseini (Persian: سید محمد حسینی, born 4 July 1969) is a US-resident Iranian showman, political activist, radio host, and founder and current leader of an Iranian opposition group called "Restart."

== Career ==
Seyed Mohammad Hosseini was born in Iran and joined the Islamic Republic of Iran Broadcasting service in 1994 as a TV program host. During his years as host, Hosseini was also active as a producer, director, and hosted a number of game shows until 2010. In 2011, Hosseini immigrated to the United States as a political refugee and became a vocal advocate against the Islamic Republic of Iran.

In the US, he has started an opposition group called "Restart" which is currently active against the Islamic Republic. Since the inception of his opposition group, Hosseini has attempted to attract young Iranians to his group with the ultimate goal of regime change. Hosseini encourages his followers to attack the Islamic Revolutionary Guard Corps and Basij bases and government buildings throughout the country as part of his plan to cause the collapse of the government. The Restart movement led by Hosseini claims to have some 20 million international followers and describes itself as the largest opposition group against the Islamic Republic of Iran.
