= List of political slogans =

Slogans and catchphrases are used by politicians, political parties, militaries, activists, and protestors to express or encourage particular beliefs or actions.

== List ==
=== International usage ===
- Better dead than Red – anti-Communist slogan
- Black is beautiful – political slogan of a cultural movement that began in the 1960s by African Americans
- Black Lives Matter – decentralized social movement that began in 2013 following the acquittal of George Zimmerman in the shooting death of African American teen Trayvon Martin; popularized in the United States following 2014 protests in Ferguson, Missouri, and internationally following 2020 George Floyd protests
- Black power – slogan and a name for various associated ideologies associated with self-determination for black people; popularized by Stokely Carmichael in the 1960s
- Blood and soil – nationalist slogan for Nazi Germany's racial policies; later adopted by white nationalist and alt-right movements in North America
- Bread and roses – slogan, poem, and song associated with suffrage and labor movements
- Eat the rich – political slogan associated with anti-capitalism and left-wing politics; originally traced to Jean-Jacques Rousseau, who is reputed to have said, "When the people shall have nothing more to eat, they will eat the rich."
- From each according to his ability, to each according to his needs – Marxist slogan
- Give me liberty or give me death! – slogan coined by Patrick Henry prior to the American Revolutionary War; various versions and translations have been used around the world
- God made Adam and Eve, not Adam and Steve – anti-LGBTQ slogan used by Christians who oppose homosexuality on religious grounds; used by televangelist and Moral Majority leader Jerry Falwell
- Inquilab Zindabad (Hindustani for 'Long live the revolution') – phrase used by communist parties in India and Pakistan. The slogan was widely used in Bangladesh during the July Revolution.
- Joy Bangla (Bengali for 'Victory for Bengal' or 'Hail Bengal') – Bengali nationalistic slogan and war cry used in Bangladesh and West Bengal; national slogan of Bangladesh from 2022 to 2024
- Khela Hobe (Bengali for 'The game is on') – slogan used in Bangladesh and India
- Lal Salam (Hindustani for 'Red Salute') – Hindustani phrase translating to 'Red Salute'; used by communists in the Indian subcontinent as a salute, greeting, or code word
- Make love, not war – anti-war slogan began during the War in Vietnam
- Ma Mati Manush (Bengali for 'Mother, Land, and People') – slogan used by the Bangladesh Nationalist Party (in Bangladesh) and Trinamool Congress (in West Bengal)
- No gods, no masters – phrase associated with anarchist philosophy and the leftist labor movement
- Nothing about us without us – Latin slogan (Nihil de nobis, sine nobis) that impacted Poland's 1505 constitutional legislation Nihil novi and Hungarian law; translated into English in the 1990s for disability rights movements
  - Nothing about Ukraine without Ukraine – foreign policy principle that became relevant during the Russian–Ukrainian War, especially after Russia's full-scale invasion of Ukraine in 2022
- One man, one vote – slogan used worldwide for universal suffrage, most notably in the United Kingdom, the United States, and South Africa
- Piss On Pity – slogan that has primarily been deployed in protest of charities that fundraise by portraying disabled people as burdensome and helpless
- Power to the people – an anti-establishment slogan used in a variety of contexts by different political groups
- Sí se puede (Spanish for 'Yes, we can') – motto of the United Farm Workers; used in English and Spanish by the Barack Obama 2008 presidential campaign
- Stop the boats – an anti-immigration slogan used by Tony Abbott during the 2013 Australian federal election, and later during the premiership of Rishi Sunak against English Channel migrant crossings to the United Kingdom
- The rich get richer and the poor get poorer – aphorism attributed to Percy Bysshe Shelley; used frequently to describe wealth concentration and economic inequality
- No such thing as a free lunch – popular adage communicating the idea that it is impossible to get something for nothing
- The whole world is watching – phrase used by anti-war demonstrators and others
- They shall not pass – slogan used to express a determination to defend a position against an enemy; most notably used by France in World War I; also used during the Spanish Civil War by the Republican faction
- Think globally, act locally – phrase used in various contexts, including urban planning
- White power – slogan and chant of white supremacists
- White Lives Matter – slogan and chant of white nationalists
- It's okay to be white – slogan and chant of white nationalists
- The Fourteen Words (We must secure the existence of our people and a future for white children.) – slogan and chant of white nationalists
- Workers of the world, unite! (German: Proletarier aller Länder, vereinigt Euch!, literally 'Proletarians of all countries, unite!') – working-class rallying cry originating from the 1848 Communist Manifesto by Karl Marx and Friedrich Engels; slogan used by socialist states and communist parties, including those of the Soviet Union

=== Africa ===
==== Nigeria ====
- Febuhari 14 – pun combining the Yoruba word "fe" (meaning "love") with the surname of 2015 opposition presidential candidate Muhammadu Buhari
- To keep Nigeria one, is a task that must be done – a Civil War era slogan popularized by the Gowon Administration. Later repurposed by Barack Obama during the 2015 presidential elections.

==== South Africa ====
- #FeesMustFall – slogan used during the 2015 national student protests calling for the abolition of fees in public universities in South Africa
- Liberation before education – slogan in opposition to the segregated Bantu education system in South Africa under apartheid
- One settler, one bullet – rallying cry of the Azanian People's Liberation Army during the armed struggle against apartheid
- Rhodes Must Fall – slogan used during the early 2015 students protests in South Africa; directed against the now-removed statue of Cecil Rhodes at the University of Cape Town

==== Zimbabwe ====
- Zimbabwean Lives Matter – 2020 online protest against the government of President Emmerson Mnangagwa

=== Americas ===
==== Canada ====
- Axe the Tax
- Last Best West – slogan encouraging immigration to the Prairie Provinces

==== Cuba ====
- Hasta la victoria siempre (Spanish for 'Until Victory, Forever!') – slogan used by Marxist revolutionary Che Guevara
- Patria o Muerte (Spanish for 'Homeland or Death') – 1960 slogan of Fidel Castro used for the first time at a memorial service for the La Coubre explosion; became a motto of the Cuban Revolution
- Patria y Vida (Spanish for 'Homeland and Life') – slogan and reggaeton song originating from the San Isidro Movement and associated with the 2021 Cuban protests; the slogan is an inversion of the Cuban Revolution motto Patria o Muerte ('Homeland or Death')

==== United States ====
Trump's "Make America Great Again!" sign used during his 2024 presidential campaign before Trump selected JD Vance as his vice presidential running mate

- America is Back
- Believe women – slogan used to encourage people to believe the testimony of women regarding violence and sexual assault
- Build Back Better – name of the economic recovery plan put forward by the Joe Biden 2020 presidential campaign
- Come and take it – phrase used in 1778 at Fort Morris during the American Revolutionary War and in later last stands; later used in regard to the right to keep and bear arms
- Compassionate conservatism – slogan of the George W. Bush 2000 presidential campaign
- Defund the police – slogan calling for the reallocation of funds from police departments to non-policing forms of public safety
- Deny, Defend, Depose – slogan often associated with anti-capitalism and the denial of insurance claims; originates from the similar phrase "Delay, Deny, Defend," used to criticize the American healthcare industry, but was popularized following the assassination of Brian Thompson, the former CEO of UnitedHealthcare.
- Don't Mess with Texas – slogan that began as anti-littering campaign; later adopted for political and other purposes
- Drill, baby, drill – slogan used by the Republican Party to call for increasing domestic oil and gas production
- Every Man a King – slogan of Louisiana Governor and United States Senator Huey Long as part of the broader wealth redistribution program Share Our Wealth; also the title of a 1935 song cowritten by Long and Castro Carazo
- Fifty-Four Forty or Fight – slogan used during the 19th-century Oregon boundary dispute
- I like Ike – slogan for the Draft Eisenhower movement, the only successful political draft of the 20th century; the movement persuaded former General Dwight D. Eisenhower to run for president in 1952
- Let's Go Brandon – slogan used as a euphemism for "Fuck Joe Biden" by Republican politicians and those opposed to President Joe Biden
- Make America Great Again – slogan used by various conservative political candidates in the United States since 1980, most notably Ronald Reagan and Donald Trump
- New Nationalism – slogan of Theodore Roosevelt's 1912 presidential campaign with the Progressive Party; derived from Herbert Croly's pamphlet The Promise of American Life and adopted by Roosevelt after an August 1910 speech in Osawatomie, Kansas
- The New Freedom – slogan of Woodrow Wilson's 1912 presidential campaign
- No taxation without representation – slogan first used during the American Revolutionary War; later used by advocates of women's suffrage, District of Columbia voting rights, student inclusion in higher education governance, and the Tea Party movement
- Peace with Honor – phrase used by several notable authors and politicians; used by President Richard Nixon in 1973 to describe the Paris Peace Accords to end the Vietnam War
- Read my lips: no new taxes – most prominent sound bite from American presidential candidate George H. W. Bush's speech at the 1988 Republican National Convention; later cited by Bush opponents as a broken promise
- Remember Pearl Harbor – slogan and song created after the 1941 Japanese attack on Pearl Harbor
- Stay the course – slogan popularized by President Ronald Reagan while campaigning for Republicans during the 1982 mid-term elections and later used by his Vice President George H. W. Bush.
- Stop the Steal – slogan created in 2016 by Republican political operative Roger Stone in anticipation of potential election losses that could be portrayed as stolen by alleged fraud
- The buck stops here – phrase popularized by President Harry S. Truman in reference to government accountability
- The personal is political – slogan associated with 1960s second wave feminism
- Tippecanoe and Tyler Too – campaign song of the William Henry Harrison 1840 presidential campaign; the slogan references Whig candidates William Henry Harrison (the "hero of Tippecanoe") and John Tyler
- United We Stand America – citizen action organization created by Ross Perot after his unsuccessful 1992 presidential campaign; later adopted as a slogan by the Reform Party
- War on women – phrase used to describe certain Republican policies and legislation that restrict women's rights, especially reproductive rights including abortion
- We are the 99% – slogan coined and widely used during the 2011 Occupy Wall Street; the slogan refers to income and wealth inequality in the United States
- When the looting starts, the shooting starts – statement by Walter E. Headley on the eve of the 1968 Republican National Convention in response to unrest; re-introduced by Donald Trump in response to protests relating to the murder of George Floyd
- Whip inflation now (WIN) – initiative by the Gerald Ford presidential administration to combat stagflation during the 1970s recession by voluntary measures as opposed to the minimum wage and price controls pursued by his predecessors; the campaign was widely ridiculed by the public and contributed to the Democratic Party's victory in the 1974 congressional elections and the 1976 presidential election, and it was abandoned during the 1976 Republican Party presidential primaries in favor of a program of tax cuts

=== Asia ===
==== Bangladesh ====
- Bangladesh Zindabad (Bengali for 'Long live Bangladesh') – expression of Bangladeshi patriotism often used in political speeches and at cricket matches
- Tumi Ke? Ami Ke? Razakar! Razakar! Ke boleche, ke boleche, shoirachar, shoirachar! (transl. Who are you? Who am I? Razakar! Razakar! Who says? Who says? The Dictator! The Dictator!). The slogan was used by protestors as Sheikh Hasina who referred to students as "razakar" for during the 2024 quota reform protest.

==== China ====
- Common prosperity – slogan of the Chinese Communist Party, stating the goal of bolstering social equality and economic equity
- Four new inventions – 2017 slogan used by state media claiming that mainland China invented high-speed rail, mobile payment, e-commerce, and bike-sharing; based on the Four Great Inventions
- Revolution is not a dinner party – phrase coined by Mao Zedong in the 1927 essay Report on an Investigation of the Peasant Movement in Hunan; the phrase means that a revolution should not be expected to be gentle or restrained
- Serve the People (Chinese: 全心全意为人民服务) – political slogan of Mao Zedong; later became popular among the New Left, Red Guard Party, and Black Panther Party due to their strong Maoist influences.

==== India ====
- VANDE MATRAM
- Jai Bhim (Hindustani for 'Hail Bhim' or 'Victory to Bhim') – slogan used by Indians, especially Ambedkarites, referring to B. R. Ambedkar
- Jai Hind ('Hail India')
- Jai Jawan Jai Kisan ('Hail the Soldier, Hail the Farmer') – slogan used by the Prime Minister Lal Bahadur Shashtri in 1965; later adapted by other politicians

==== Indonesia ====
- "Gitu aja kok repot?" (Indonesian for 'Why make such a fuss over something so simple?') – a quote often popularly used by Abdurrahman Wahid
- "I henceforth proclaim Trikora" – Sukarno when giving a speech at the UN and it became a common slogan when discussing national issues.
- Inggris kita linggis, Amerika kita setrika (Indonesian for 'Britain we'll crowbar, United States we'll iron') – collaborationist slogan used by Sukarno during the Japanese occupation; later used during the Konfrontasi and Indonesian withdrawal from the United Nations
- "Lanjutkan!" (Indonesian for 'continue') – Susilo Bambang Yudhoyono's campaign slogan for 2009 Indonesian presidential election
- "Lebih Cepat Lebih Baik" (Indonesian for 'faster and better') – Jusuf Kalla's campaign slogan for 2009 Indonesian presidential election, an apparent criticism to Susilo Bambang Yudhoyono's perceived inaction.
- "Merdeka! Merdeka! Merdeka!" – a slogan used by Megawati Sukarnoputri whenever she starts or ends a speech, quoting Sukarno.
- "Semua bisa diatur" (Indonesian for 'everything can be arranged') – a famous slogan by Vice President Adam Malik

==== Israel ====
- Am Yisrael Chai (Hebrew for 'The Nation of Israel Lives On')

==== Iran ====
- Woman, Life, Freedom (Kurdish: Jin, Jiyan, Azadî, ژن، ژیان، ئازادی) – slogan that became a rallying cry during the Mahsa Amini protests in Iran as a response to the death of Mahsa Amini

==== Japan ====
- Hakkō ichiu (Japanese for 'All the world under one roof') – slogan used from the Second Sino-Japanese War to World War II; the slogan implies the divine right of the Empire of Japan to "unify the eight corners of the world"

==== Pakistan ====
- Go Nawaz Go – slogan used by supporters of the Pakistan Tehreek-e-Insaf and Pakistan Awami Tehrik parties during the political movement against the Nawaz Sharif government
- Pakistan khappay (Sindhi for 'We want Pakistan') – phrase coined by President Asif Ali Zardari
- Pakistan Zindabad (Urdu for 'Long live Pakistan') – slogan in displays of Pakistani nationalism

==== Palestine ====
- "From the river to the sea" – slogan used for freedom from oppression across the historical land of Palestine between the Jordan River and the Mediterranean Sea.

=== Europe ===
==== Belarus ====
- Long Live Belarus! – motto widely used by members of the Belarusian democratic and nationalist opposition as well as members of the Belarusian diaspora

==== Croatia ====
- Za dom spremni (For the homeland - ready!) – - Croatian nationalist slogan most known for its usage by the Ustaše

==== France ====
- Je suis Charlie – slogan adopted by supporters of freedom of speech and freedom of the press following the 2015 Charlie Hebdo killings
- Liberté, égalité, fraternité (French for 'Liberty, equality, fraternity') – national motto of France originating in the French Revolution; also the national motto of Haiti
- Sous les pavés, la plage! (French for 'Under the cobblestones, the beach!') – notable slogan of the May '68 demonstrations
- Vivre Libre ou Mourir (French for 'Live free or die') – French Revolution slogan; also the motto of the US state of New Hampshire

==== Germany ====
- Heim ins Reich (German for 'Back home into the Reich') – phrase describing Adolf Hitler's initiative to include all areas with ethnic Germans in the German Reich
- Jedem das Seine (lit. 'to each his own') – German translation of Prussia's Latin-language motto suum cuique, meaning 'justice for everyone'; used 1937–1945 by Nazi Germany over the main gate at Buchenwald concentration camp, it figuratively meant "everyone gets what he deserves"; the Latin phrase was used in ancient Rome
- Meine Ehre heißt Treue (German for 'My honor is called loyalty') – motto of the Schutzstaffel in Nazi Germany; banned in modern Germany along with other Nazi slogans under Strafgesetzbuch section 86a
- Wir schaffen das (German for 'we can manage this', 'we can handle this'; or 'we can do this') – slogan used by Chancellor Angela Merkel to defend her open border policy during the 2015 European migrant crisis
- Wir sind das Volk (German for 'We are the people') – motto of the Monday demonstrations that led to the demise of the German Democratic Republic and German reunification

==== Greece ====
- Ena-Ena-Tessera (ένα-ένα-τέσσερα; 1–1–4) – slogan from the late 1960s to early 1970s referencing Article 114 of the 1952 constitution

==== Ireland ====
- Éirinn go Brách (Irish for 'Ireland Forever') – phrase used to express allegiance to Ireland or Irish pride; anglicised as "Erin go Bragh"
- Sinn Féin (Irish for 'We ourselves') – motto for the Irish Home Rule movement beginning in the 19th century; inspired a political party of the same name in Northern Ireland
- Tiocfaidh ár lá (Irish for 'Our Day Will Come') – slogan for a United Ireland

==== Portugal ====
- Deus, pátria e família (Portuguese for 'God, fatherland and family') – Salazar reactionary slogan in the Estado Novo regime in Portugal

==== Ukraine ====
- Slava Ukraini (Ukrainian for 'Glory to Ukraine!') – slogan of Ukrainian nationalists originating from the Ukrainian War of Independence

==== United Kingdom ====
- Church in Danger – slogan used by the Tory Party in elections during Queen Anne's reign
- Get Brexit Done – Conservative Party slogan for the 2019 UK General Election
- Hands Off Russia – slogan created by British socialists protesting the Allied intervention in the Russian Civil War
- Labour Isn't Working – 1978 Conservative Party poster devised by Saatchi and Saatchi showing a long queue outside an unemployment office, commenting on the high levels of unemployment; the campaign was a success with the Conservatives winning the election and Margaret Thatcher becoming Prime Minister
- Maggie Out – popular chant used at rallies and marches opposing the government of Margaret Thatcher
- New Labour, New Danger – slogan on 1997 Conservative Party campaign poster depicting Tony Blair with glowing red eyes; the campaign was criticised by the opposing Labour Party and the Advertising Standards Authority for negative advertising and using Blair's image without his permission
- Strong and stable – slogan used by Prime Minister Theresa May while campaigning for the 2017 general election; it also became an internet meme
- Take back control – slogan popularised by the Vote Leave campaign in support of Britain's withdrawal from the European Union in the 2016 Brexit referendum
- There is no alternative – pro-capitalism slogan often used by Margaret Thatcher

==== Romania ====
- Basarabia, Romanian land – Romanian nationalist and irredentist phrase posing claims over the region of Basarabia
- Să trăiți bine! – Romanian slogan belonging to Traian Băsescu, used in the 2004 Romanian general elections
- Cheia e la tine! – motto used in the 1996 Romanian general election by the Romanian Democratic Convention, especially by its presidential candidate and future president Emil Constantinescu

==== Russia ====
- Khuy Voyne! (Russian for 'Fuck war!') – anti-Iraq War phrase made famous by Russian group t.A.T.u.
- Putin Must Go – website and public campaign of opponents of President Vladimir Putin; used since 2010

==== Scotland ====
- It's Scotland's oil – slogan used by the Scottish National Party (SNP) during the 1970s in making their economic case for Scottish independence

==== Serbia ====
- Kosovo is Serbia – slogan used by protesters as a reaction to Kosovo's unilateral declaration of independence

==== Spain ====
- ¡Democracia Real YA! (Spanish for 'Real Democracy NOW!') – grassroots organization and slogan used in 2011 protests
- Let Txapote vote for you – slogan used by the right and far-right during the 2023 Spanish general election; referring to Basque separatist Francisco Javier García Gaztelu (nicknamed "Txapote"), the slogan was used against Prime Minister Pedro Sánchez
- Una, Grande y Libre (Spanish for 'One, Great and Free') – Francoist slogan for Spanish nationalism

==== Yugoslavia ====
- Brotherhood and unity – slogan used by the League of Communists of Yugoslavia after World War II
- Death to fascism, freedom to the people – anti-Nazi slogan used by the Yugoslav resistance movement during World War II

=== Oceania ===
==== Australia ====
- It's Time – slogan used by the Australian Labor Party during the 1972 federal election campaign; the campaign was successful, with Labor winning the majority for the first time since 1949

==== New Zealand ====
- Let's do this – slogan used by the New Zealand Labour Party during the 2017 general election campaign, headed by leader Jacinda Ardern; the campaign was successful, resulting in a Labour-led coalition government.
- Toitū te Tiriti (Te Reo Māori for 'Honour the Treaty') – slogan used by Māori activists, popularised during the 2024 Hīkoi mō te Tiriti in opposition to the Treaty Principles Bill

== See also ==
- List of ideological symbols
- List of labor slogans
- List of national mottos
- List of Philippine presidential campaign slogans
- Italian fascism § Italian fascist slogans
