= America is back =

Political catchphrase

"America is back" is a catchphrase and political slogan used by a variety of United States presidents and other political leaders to assert a return to American prosperity or engagement after their election.

== Usage ==
Reagan administration
The "America is back" slogan was used during the presidency of Ronald Reagan to represent the theme of American economic recovery and Reagan invoked the phrase during his 1984 State of the Union Address. It later became a Reagan-Bush campaign motto during the 1984 U.S. presidential election.
George W. Bush administration
The phrase was used by Arnold Schwarzenegger during his speech to the 2004 Republican National Convention, who declared that "Ladies and gentlemen, America is back!".
Obama administration
Susan Rice used it during a February 23, 2009 NPR interview about her recent appointment as Permanent Representative of the United States of America to the United Nations. Hillary Clinton used it in speeches while serving as United States Secretary of State during the presidency of Barack Obama. Obama himself invoked it during his 2012 State of the Union address.
First Trump administration
Donald Trump declared "we are going to show the whole world that America is back" while speaking during a rally on September 28, 2016 in Council Bluffs, Iowa and used the phrase intermittently on other occasions during his first presidency.

Avatar of Joe Biden

Joe Biden
(@joebiden)
tweeted:

America is back.

November 10, 2020

Biden administration
The slogan was also used during the presidency of Joe Biden and, according to Alessandro Colombo, was "repeated by Biden almost daily during the first 100 days of his presidency". "America is back" was also digitally invoked in the first 100 tweets from Biden's Twitter account following his election.

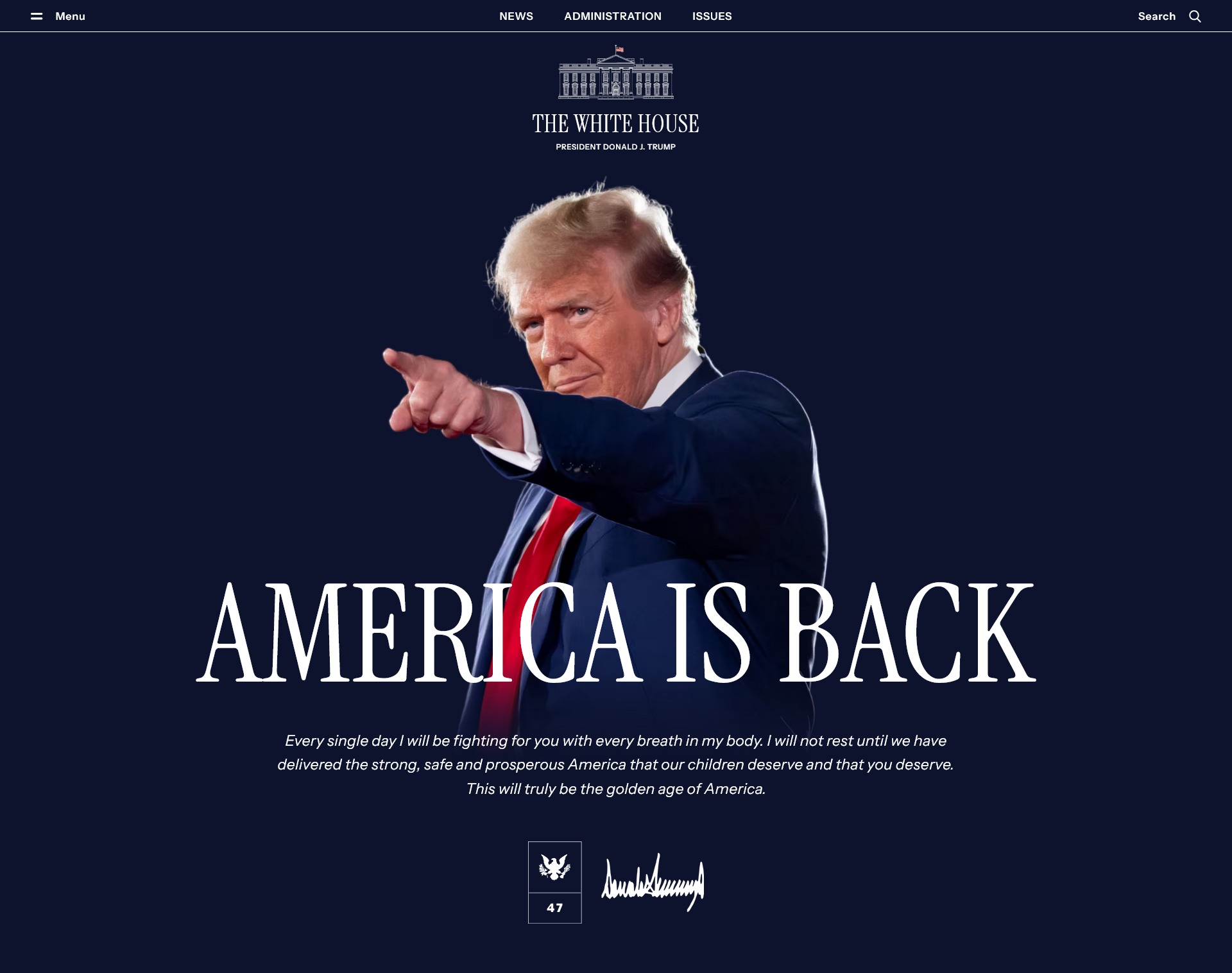
The White House website on inauguration day (January 20, 2025), emblazoned with the slogan "America is back"

Second Trump administration
Trump repeatedly invoked the slogan at the start of his second presidential term, including in his first address to Congress in 2025. Following massive Republican defeats in the 2026 midterm elections, House Democratic Caucus leader Hakeem Jeffries opened a Democratic victory speech in Washington, D.C., with the phrase "America is back".

== Quiddity ==
The slogan has been used to convey different messages.

As used by Ronald Reagan, "the slogan 'America is back!' signaled the return of such 'traditional values' as enthusiasm for unregulated economic growth", according to T. J. Jackson Lears.

In his analysis of the slogan as used during the presidency of Joe Biden, Dennis Mills explained that "Biden ... [was] attempting to return to the Obama-era focus on America's diplomacy. This is the meaning of Biden's slogan 'America is back'". According to Daniel Rueda Garrido, Biden's usage of "America is back" to indicate a heightened foreign policy focus on Atlanticism positioned him "as the incarnation of America, which is held as the centre of the form of life of liberal capitalism and democracy" and "which presupposes a moment of prior retreat hinted presumably at Trump".

However, Marc Chandler writing in Barron's in 2021, noted that there was reason to be skeptical about the assertion "America is back" since the "U.S. may be one election from leaving NATO and pulling out of the Paris Accord". A study published in the Australasian Journal of American Studies posited the use of "America is back" was as a renunciation of the first presidency of Donald Trump.

== See also ==
- Build Back Better (disambiguation)
- Last Best West
- Make America Great Again
- Strong and stable
