= Make America Great Again =

American political slogan

"Make America Great Again"

Sign used during Trump's 2016 presidential campaign

Sign used during Trump's 2024 presidential campaign

"Make America Great Again" (MAGA, US: /ˈmæɡə/) is an American political slogan most recently popularized by Donald Trump during his presidential campaigns in 2016, 2020, and 2024. "MAGA" is also used to refer to Trump's ideology, political base, or to an individual or group of individuals from within that base, especially the pro-Trump faction of the Republican Party. The slogan became a pop culture phenomenon, seeing widespread use and spawning numerous variants in the arts, entertainment and politics, being used by both supporters and opponents of Trump's presidency and as the name of the super PAC Make America Great Again Inc.

Originally used by Ronald Reagan as a campaign slogan in his 1980 presidential campaign ("Let's Make America Great Again"), it was adopted by Trump in 2015. It has been described as a slogan representing American exceptionalism and promoting an idealized or romanticized American past. While some scholars, journalists, and commentators have called the slogan a loaded phrase representing racism, regarding it as dog-whistle politics and coded language that excludes certain groups, others regard the slogan as patriotic and positive.

== Pre-Trump history ==
=== Ronald Reagan ===
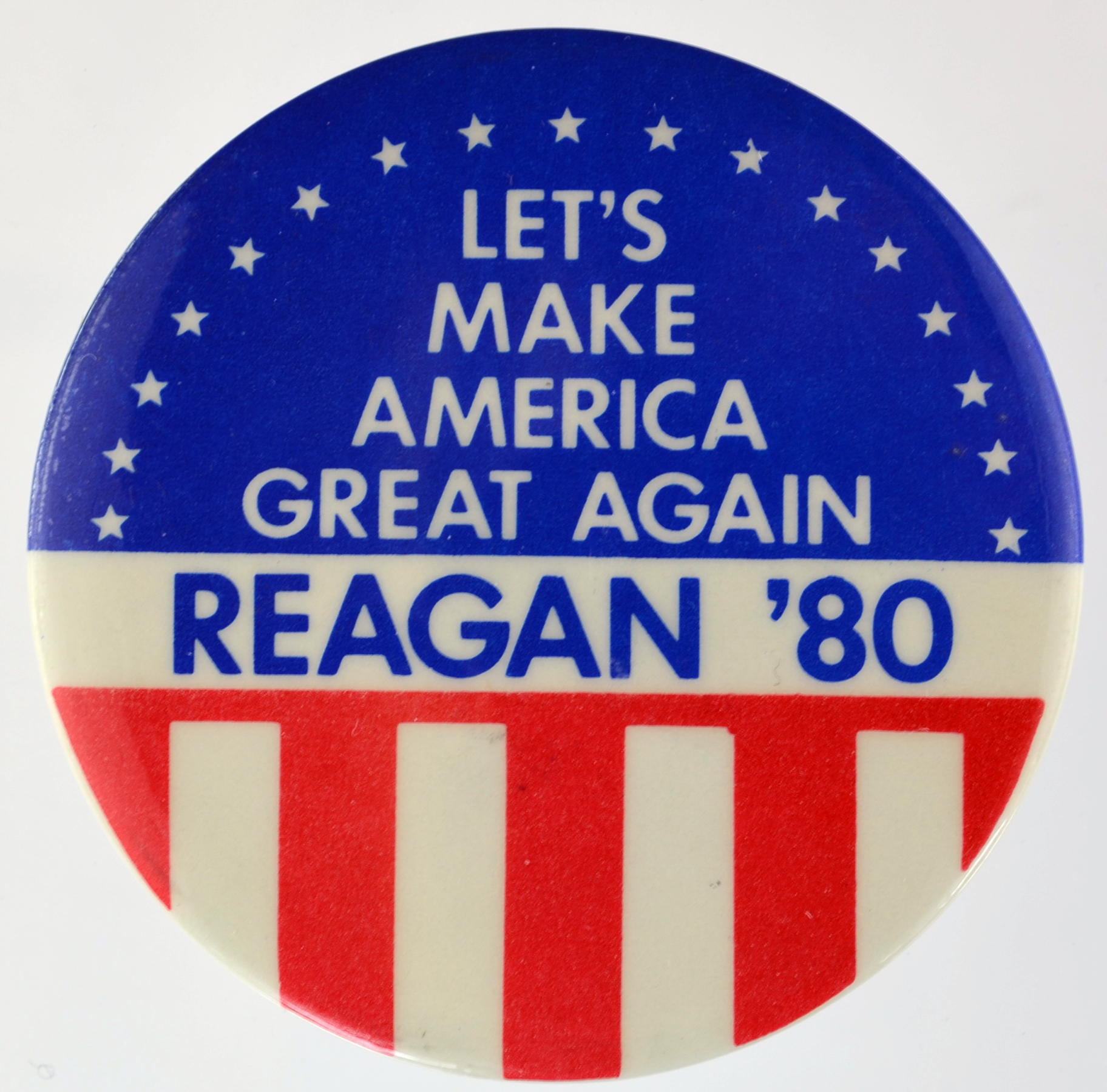
Ronald Reagan campaign button

"Let's make America great again" was famously used in Ronald Reagan's 1980 presidential campaign. At the time, the United States was suffering from a worsening economy at home marked by stagflation. Using the country's economic distress as a springboard for his campaign, Reagan used the slogan to stir a sense of patriotism among the electorate. During his acceptance speech at the 1980 Republican National Convention, Reagan said, "For those without job opportunities, we'll stimulate new opportunities, particularly in the inner cities where they live. For those who've abandoned hope, we'll restore hope and we'll welcome them into a great national crusade to make America great again."

=== Bill Clinton ===
The phrase was used in speeches by Bill Clinton during his 1992 presidential campaign. President Clinton also used the phrase in a radio commercial aired for wife Hillary Clinton's 2008 presidential primary campaign. During the 2016 electoral campaign, in which his wife was running against Trump, he suggested that Trump's version, used as a campaign rallying cry, was a message to White Southerners that Trump was promising to "give you an economy you had 50 years ago, and ... move you back up on the social totem pole and other people down."

== Use by Donald Trump ==
In December 2011, following speculation that he would challenge sitting president Barack Obama in the 2012 United States presidential election, Trump released a statement in which he said he was unwilling to rule out running as a presidential candidate in the future, explaining "I must leave all of my options open because, above all else, we must make America great again." In December 2011, he also published a book using as a subtitle the similar phrase "Making America #1 Again", which in a 2015 reissue was changed to "Make America Great Again!" On January 1, 2012, a group of Trump supporters filed paperwork with the Texas secretary of state's office to create the "Make America Great Again Party", which would have allowed Trump to be that party's nominee if he had decided to become a third-party candidate in the presidential election.

Trump began using the slogan formally on November 7, 2012, the day after Barack Obama won his re-election against Mitt Romney. Trump used the slogan in an August 2013 interview with Jonathan Karl. By his own account, he first considered "We Will Make America Great", but did not feel like it had the right "ring" to it. "Make America Great" was his next slogan idea, but upon further reflection, he felt that it was a slight to America because it implied that America was never great. He eventually selected the phrase "Make America Great Again", later claiming that he was unaware of Reagan's use in 1980 until 2015, but noted that "he didn't trademark it." On November 12, he signed an application with the United States Patent and Trademark Office requesting exclusive rights to use the slogan for political purposes. It was registered as a service mark on July 14, 2015, after Trump formally began his 2016 presidential campaign and demonstrated that he was using the slogan for the purpose stated on the application.

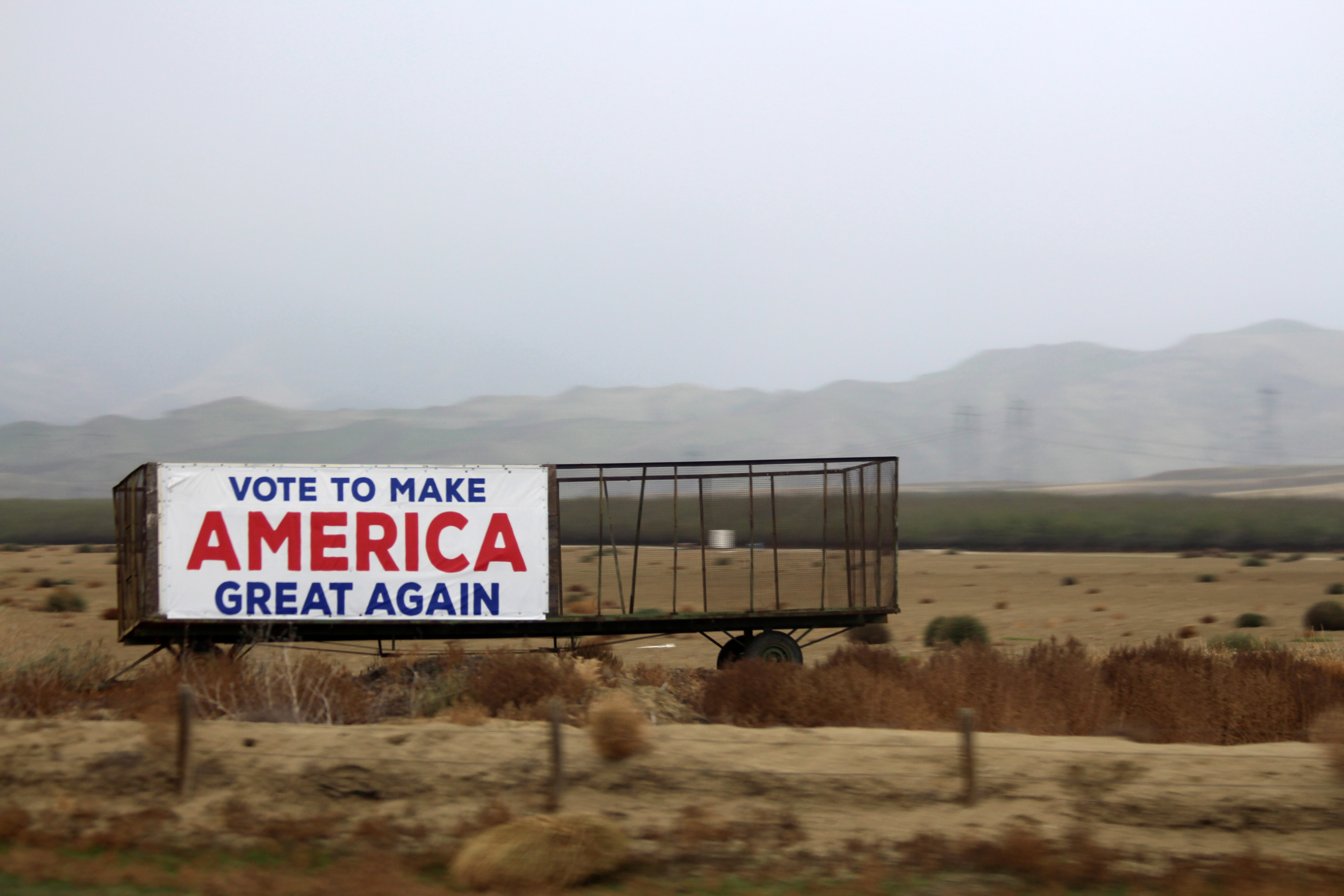
"Vote To Make America Great Again" banner in California, 2016

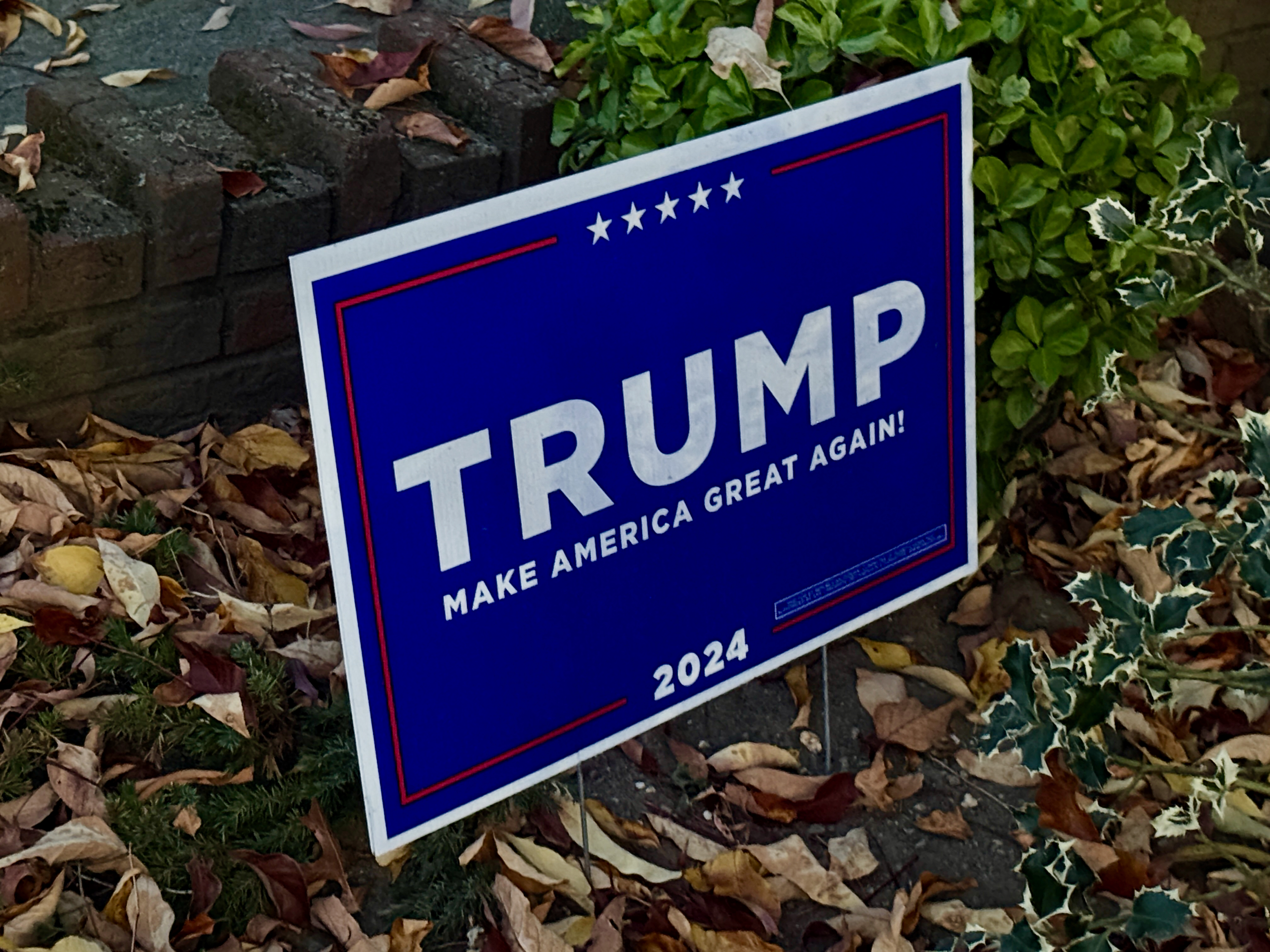
MAGA placard

However, Trump did not trademark the phrase in commerce. On August 5, 2015, radio personality Bobby Bones took note of this and successfully filed a trademark for the phrase's use in commerce. Two days later Bones tweeted at Trump, offering the use of his slogan back in exchange for a $100,000 donation to the St. Jude Children's Research Hospital. On October 29, Bones followed up the tweet with an image of a check from the Trump Organization. The amount on the check was undisclosed and Bones said that Trump could "have [his] slogan back".

Following Trump's first election, the website of his presidential transition was established at greatagain.gov. Trump said in 2017 and 2018 that the slogan of his 2020 re-election campaign would be "Keep America Great" and he sought to trademark it. However, Trump's 2020 campaign continued to use the "Make America Great Again" slogan. Trump's vice president, Mike Pence, used the phrase "make America great again, again" in his 2020 Republican National Convention speech, garnering ridicule for implying that Trump's first term had failed. In late 2021, this phrase became the name of a pro-Trump Super-PAC, which was also mocked. A 2020 executive order, titled "Promoting Beautiful Federal Civic Architecture", was nicknamed "Make Federal Buildings Beautiful Again" by proponents and the press.

Less than a week after Trump left office, he spoke to advisors about possibly establishing a third party, which he suggested might be named either the "Patriot Party" or "Make America Great Again Party". In his first few days out of office, he also supported Arizona state party chairwoman Kelli Ward, who likewise called for the creation of a "MAGA Party". In late January 2021, the former president viewed the proposed MAGA Party as leverage to prevent Republican senators from voting to convict him during the Senate impeachment trial, and to field challengers to Republicans who voted for his impeachment in the House. The phrase was used again as the official slogan of Trump's 2024 presidential campaign. On June 2, 2023, Trump called his supporters Magadonians, prompting mockery on social media.

=== MAGA hat ===
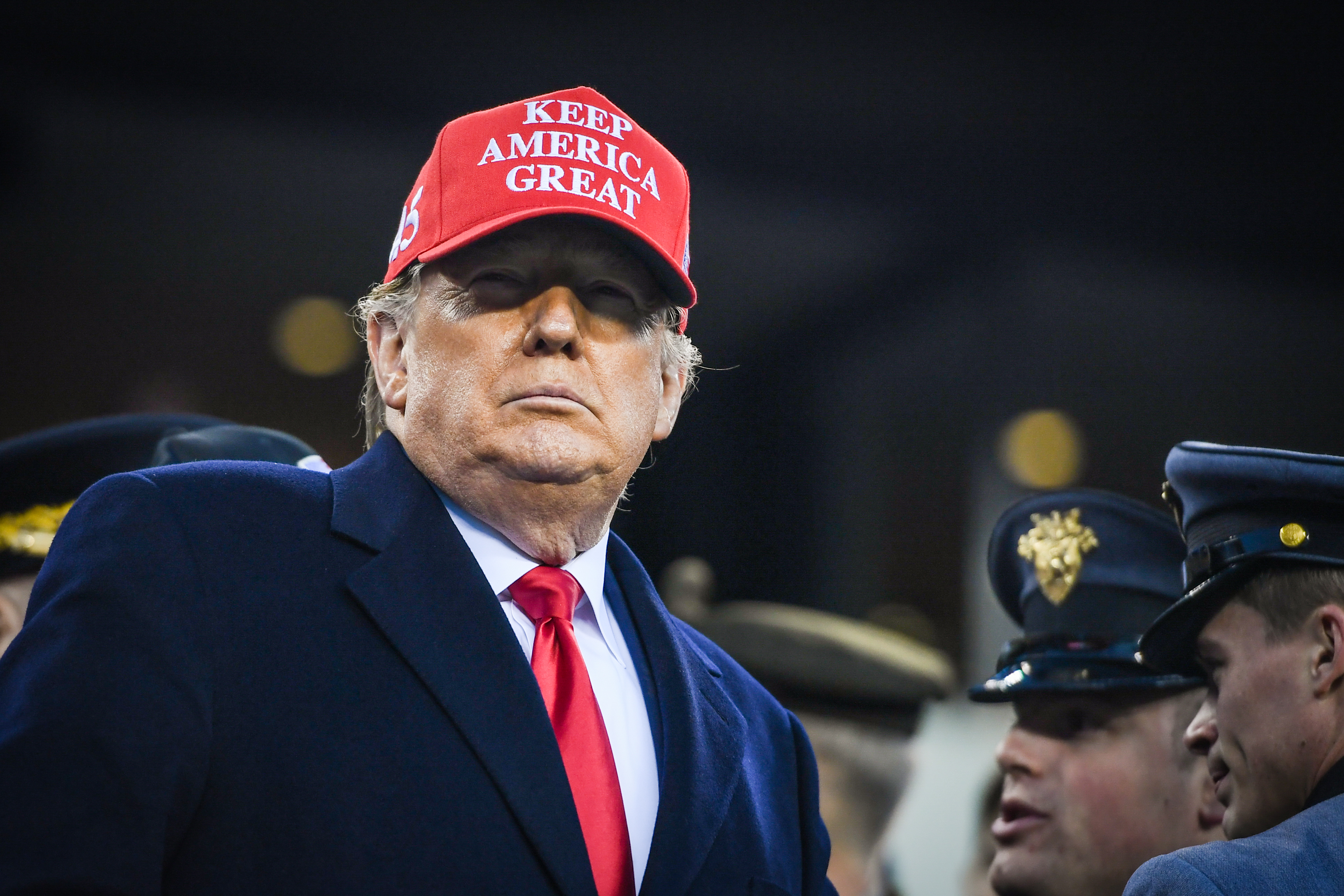
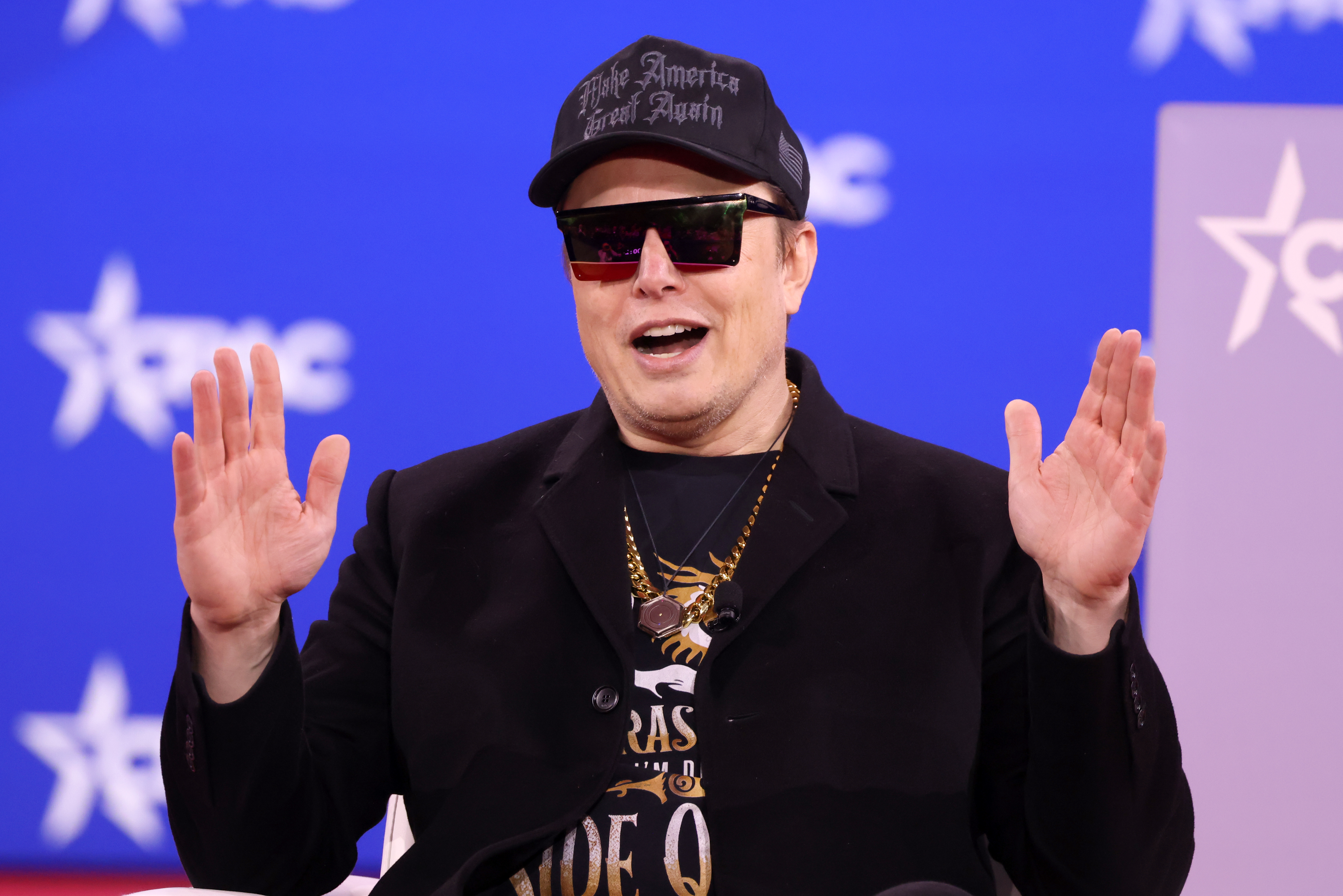
Trump with a "Keep America Great" hat in December 2019, and Elon Musk wearing a black MAGA hat at the 2025 Conservative Political Action Conference

During the 2016 campaign, Trump often used the slogan, especially by wearing MAGA hats emblazoned with the phrase in white letters, which soon became popular among his supporters. The slogan was so important to the campaign that at one point it spent more on making the hats – sold for $25 each on its website – than on polling, consultants, or television commercials. Millions were sold, and Trump estimated that counterfeit versions outnumbered the real hat ten to one. "... but it was a slogan, and every time somebody buys one, that's an advertisement." The hat's white-on-red design saw great success as a symbol of unity among Trump supporters.

Some critics have compared its use to other politically charged symbols, such as the Confederate flag, while supporters view it as an expression of patriotism and political identity. Due to its association with Trump and his policies, the hat has been a source of controversy. Some individuals view it as a divisive or provocative symbol, while others see it as an exercise of their political beliefs.

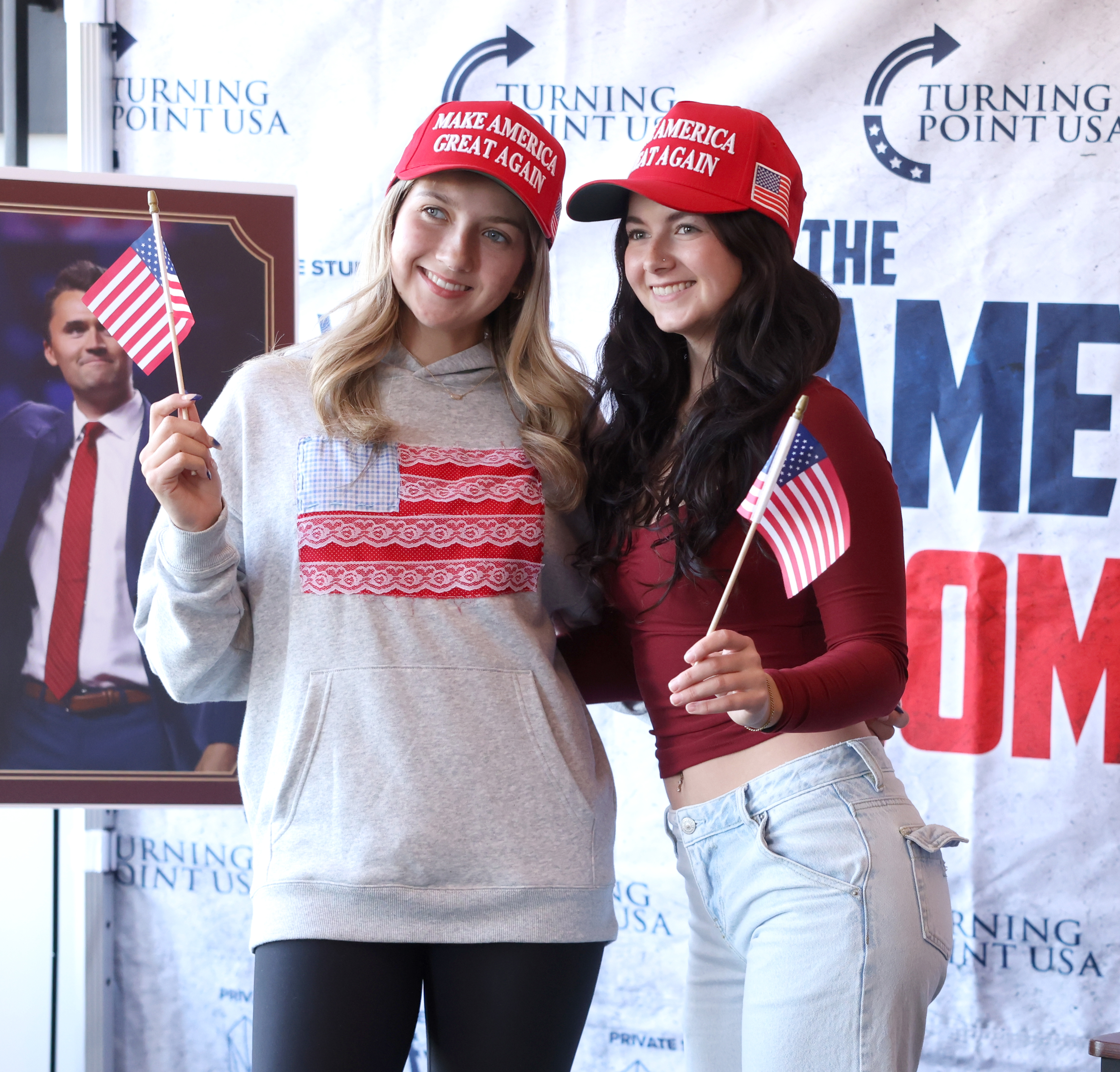
Trump supporters wearing MAGA hats, October 2025

In January 2019, it gained media attention during a highly publicized standoff between a group of high schoolers wearing the hat and Omaha tribe leader Nathan Phillips. The incident was initially perceived by some as racially charged; however, subsequent video footage led to a reassessment of the situation by multiple media outlets. On December 29, 2022, the 9th Circuit Court of Appeals ruled that wearing a MAGA hat is considered protected speech under the First Amendment after a former teacher who wore a MAGA hat to school described facing verbal harassment and retaliation from school employees.

=== Use on social media sites ===
Donald Trump took the campaign slogan to social media (primarily to Twitter), using the hashtags #makeamericagreatagain and its acronym #maga. In response to criticism regarding his frequent and untraditional usage of social media, Trump defended himself by tweeting "My use of social media is not Presidential – it's MODERN DAY PRESIDENTIAL. Make America Great Again!" on July 1, 2017.

In the first half of 2017, Trump posted his slogan on Twitter 33 times. In an article for Bloomberg News, Mark Whitehouse noted: "A regression analysis suggests the phrase adds (very roughly) 51,000 to a post's retweet-and-favorite count, which is important given that the average Trump tweet attracts a total of 107,000." Trump attributed his victory (in part) to social media when he said, "I won the 2016 election with interviews, speeches, and social media." According to RiteTag, the estimated hourly statistics for #maga on Twitter alone include: 1,304 unique tweets, 5,820,000 hashtag exposure, and 3,424 retweets with 14% of #maga tweets including images, 55% including links, and 51% including mentions.

== Accusations of racism ==
Regarding its use since 2015, the phrase "Make America Great Again" is considered a loaded phrase and "dog whistle" by some. Marissa Melton, a Voice of America journalist, among others, argue it is a loaded phrase because it "doesn't just appeal to people who hear it as racist coded language, but also to those who have felt a loss of status as other groups have become more empowered." Sarah Churchwell argues the slogan now resonates as "America First" did in the early 1940s, with the idea "that the true version of America is the America that looks like me, the American fantasy I imagine existed before it was diluted with other races and other people."

Writing opinion for the Los Angeles Times, Robin Abcarian wrote that "[w]earing a 'Make America Great Again' hat is not necessarily an overt expression of racism. But if you wear one, it's a pretty good indication that you share, admire or appreciate President Trump's racist views about Mexicans, Muslims and border walls." The Detroit Free Press and the Los Angeles Times reported how several of their readers rejected this characterization and did not believe the slogan or MAGA hats are evidence of racism, seeing them more in patriotic or American nationalist terms. Los Angeles Times columnist Nicholas Goldberg described MAGA as both one of the worst campaign slogans ever and "a fabulous campaign slogan", writing: "It was vague enough to appeal to optimists generally, while leaving plenty of room for bitter and resentful voters to conclude that we were finally going back to the days when they ran the world." Actor Bryan Cranston said of the slogan: "So just ask yourself from, from an African American experience, when was it ever great in America for the African American? When was it great? If you're making it great again, it's not including them."

A 2018 study that used text mining and semantic network analytics of Twitter text and hashtags networks found that the "#MakeAmericaGreatAgain" and "#MAGA" hashtags were commonly used by white supremacist and white nationalist users, and had been used as "an organizing discursive space" for far-right extremists globally.

== Derivative slogans ==
"Make America Great Again" has been the subject of many parodies, jokes, instances of praise, references, and criticisms which base themselves on the four-word slogan.

=== Derivatives used by Trump ===
"Keep America Great" has been the most popular derivative of "Make America Great Again", with Trump's 2020 presidential campaign adopting it as the official slogan, though often used alongside "Make America Great Again". Upon Trump announcing his candidacy for president in the 2024 election, commentators described his use of the tagline "Make America Great and Glorious Again" ("MAGAGA"). The term has come to be a humorous descriptor for Trump's re-election bid, and many outlets have commented on the humor that "MAGAGA" provides, usually on the word "gag" being part of the acronym.

At the 2024 Republican National Convention, some people wore clothing with the slogan "Make American Great Again Again". In October 2024, Trump promised former third-party candidate Robert F. Kennedy Jr. control of public health using the phrase "Make America Healthy Again". In November 2024, after Governor Gavin Newsom pledged to convene California lawmakers to secure California's progressive policies against the incoming Trump administration, Trump made "Make California Great Again" go viral on social media.

During a joint press conference with Philippine president Bongbong Marcos at the White House in July 2025, Trump voiced support for the Philippines' independent foreign policy and said, "I think he (Marcos) has to do what's right for his country. I've always said, you know, make the Philippines great again. Do whatever you need to do."

In January 2026, Trump said of Venezuelan vice president Delcy Rodríguez, "She's essentially willing to do what we think is necessary to make Venezuela great again." Rodríguez became acting president after the Trump administration captured Venezuelan president Nicolás Maduro and his wife and took them into custody in New York.

=== Anti-Trump derivatives, parodies, and other derivatives ===
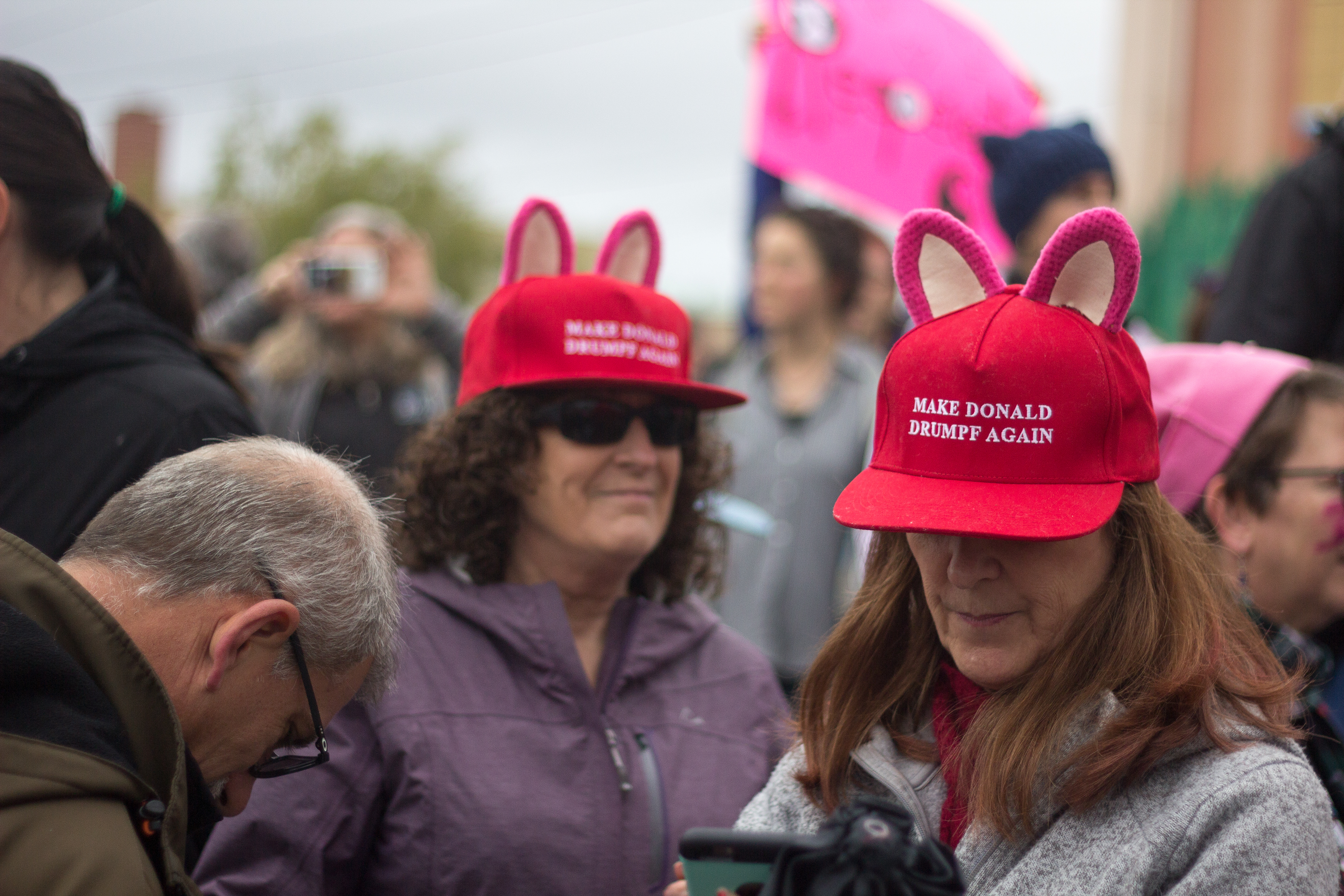
Two women wear "Make Donald Drumpf Again" hats during the 2017 Women's March.

The phrase has been parodied in political statements, such as "Make America Mexico Again", a critique of Trump's immigration policies regarding the US–Mexico border and a reference to Mexico's loss of 55% of its territory to the US with the Treaty of Guadalupe Hidalgo.

Adult film star Stormy Daniels, who allegedly had an affair with President Trump, took part in a "Make America Horny Again" strip club tour. The tour followed Trump's initial 2016 campaign trail and part of the revenue was donated to Planned Parenthood. John Oliver spoofed the slogan on his show Last Week Tonight with John Oliver in a segment dedicated to Trump, urging viewers to "Make Donald Drumpf Again", in reference to the original ancestral name of the Trump family. The segment broke HBO viewership records, garnering 85 million views.

In 2017, after the certification of the election of Trump by Congress, then-Vice-president Joe Biden was heard saying "God Save the Queen", leading to History Today claiming it would get "Make America Great Britain Again". Later in the year, comedian Jimmy Kimmel repeated the phrase to suggest limiting presidential power. A 2018 essay about the Barack Obama birtherism conspiracy in the Journal of Hate Studies by two professors at Bates College was titled "Make America Hate Again: Donald Trump and the Birther Conspiracy".

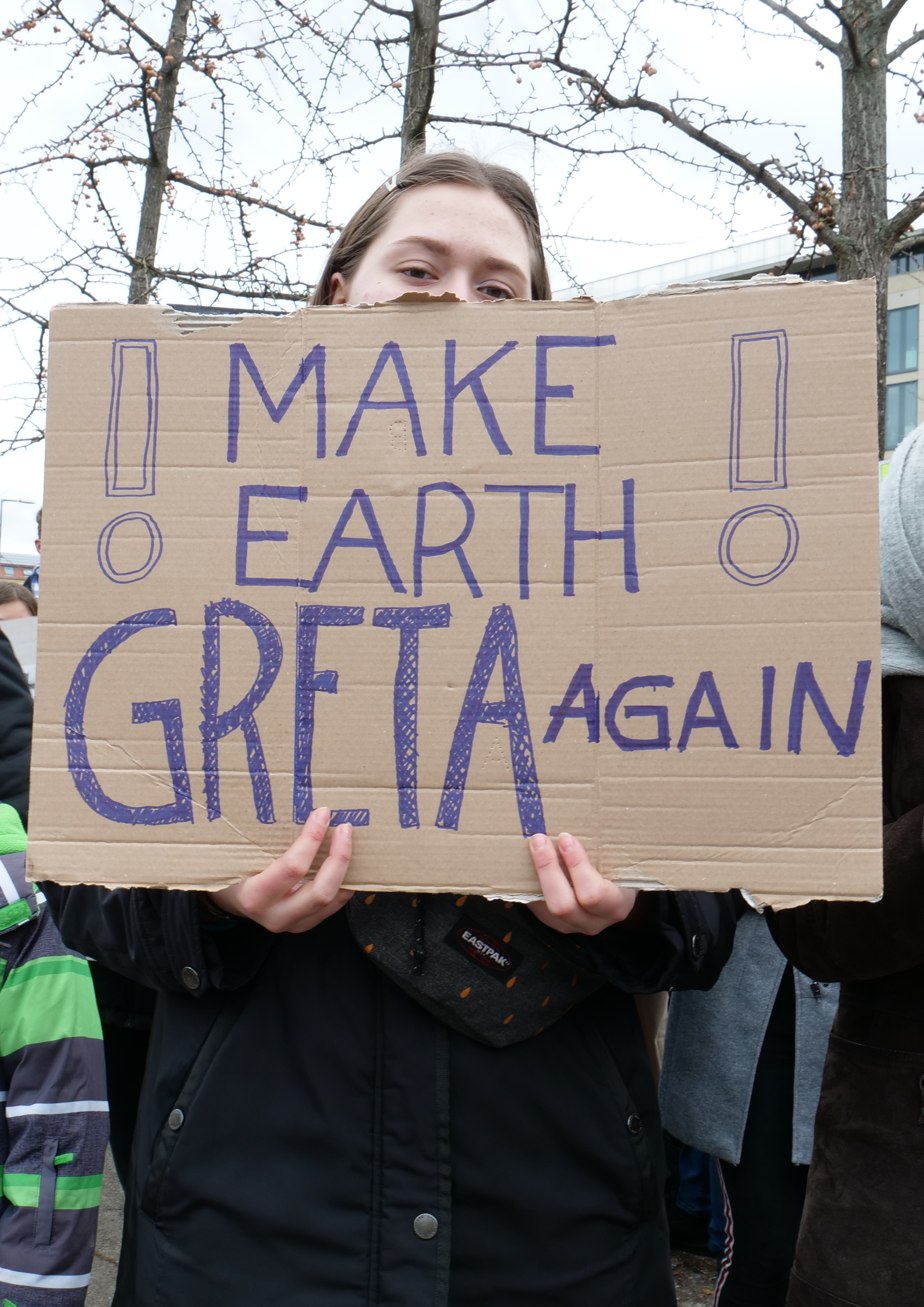
A 2019 "Make Earth Greta Again" protestor in Berlin

The phrase has been adopted by some environmentalists. In June 2017, French president Emmanuel Macron rebuked Trump over withdrawing from the Paris Agreement. The last sentence of the speech he delivered was "make our planet great again". Members of the Fridays for Future Movement have also frequently used slogans like "Make Earth Greta Again", referring to environmental activist Greta Thunberg. In 2019, Grant Armour and Milene Larsson co-directed a documentary film named Make the World Greta Again. After Joe Biden defeated Trump in the 2020 presidential election, Biden's wife Jill posted an image of her and her husband on Instagram which featured Joe wearing a blue cap with white text reading "We Just Did", meant as a response to Trump's "Make America Great Again" slogan.

In late 2022, the political slogan "MAGA Communism" trended on Twitter after being tweeted out by former San Clemente city council candidate Jackson Hinkle. MAGA Communism adherents call on those who support the American working class to ally with members of the MAGA movement. The term "Blue MAGA" is used to criticize a cult-like dedication to Biden as a person, the Democratic Party's use of conspiracy theories to explain opposition to Biden's 2024 presidential candidacy, and dismissals of information or polling that does not reflect well on Biden; the term seeks to suggest an equivalence between some supporters of Biden and Trump.

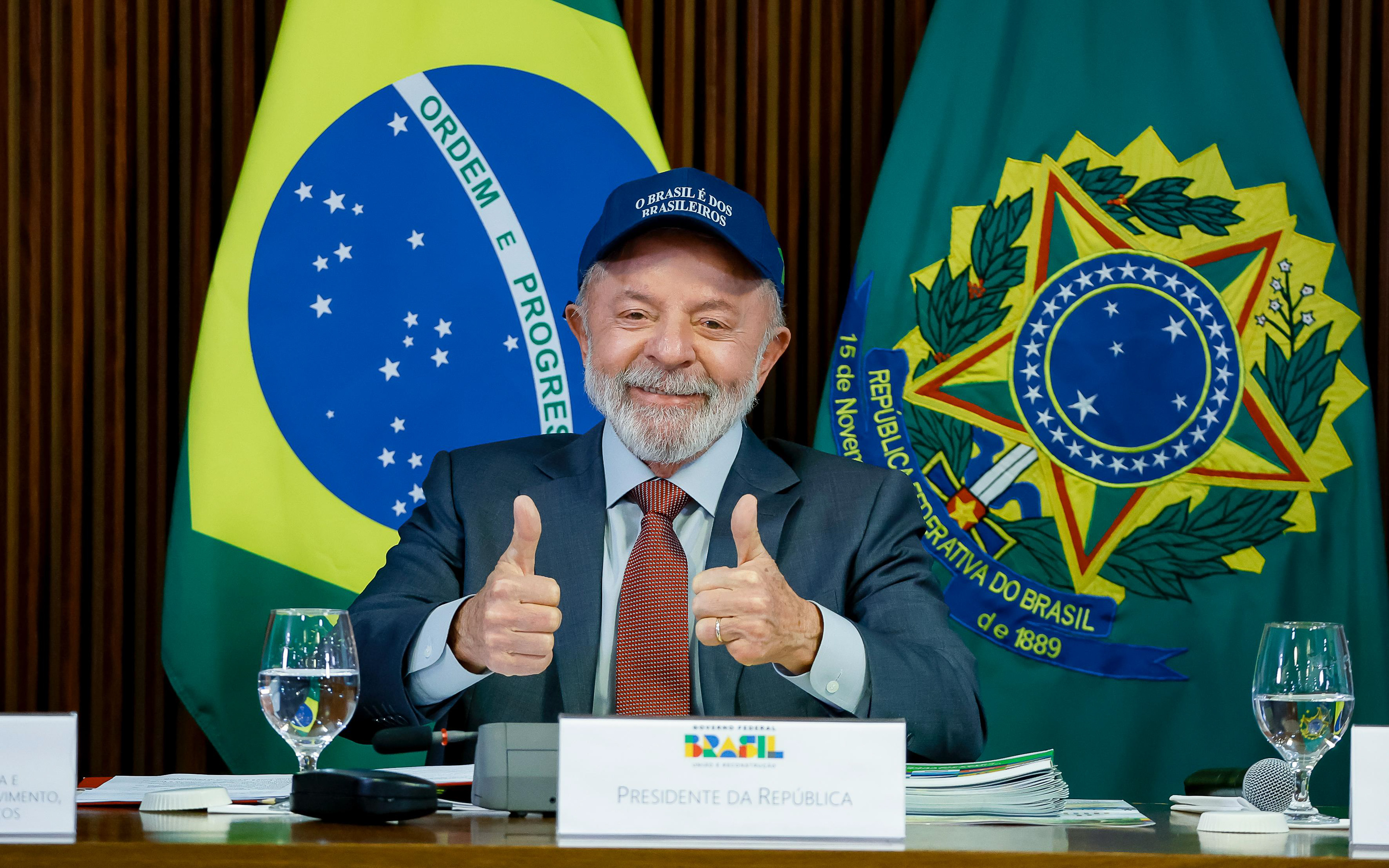
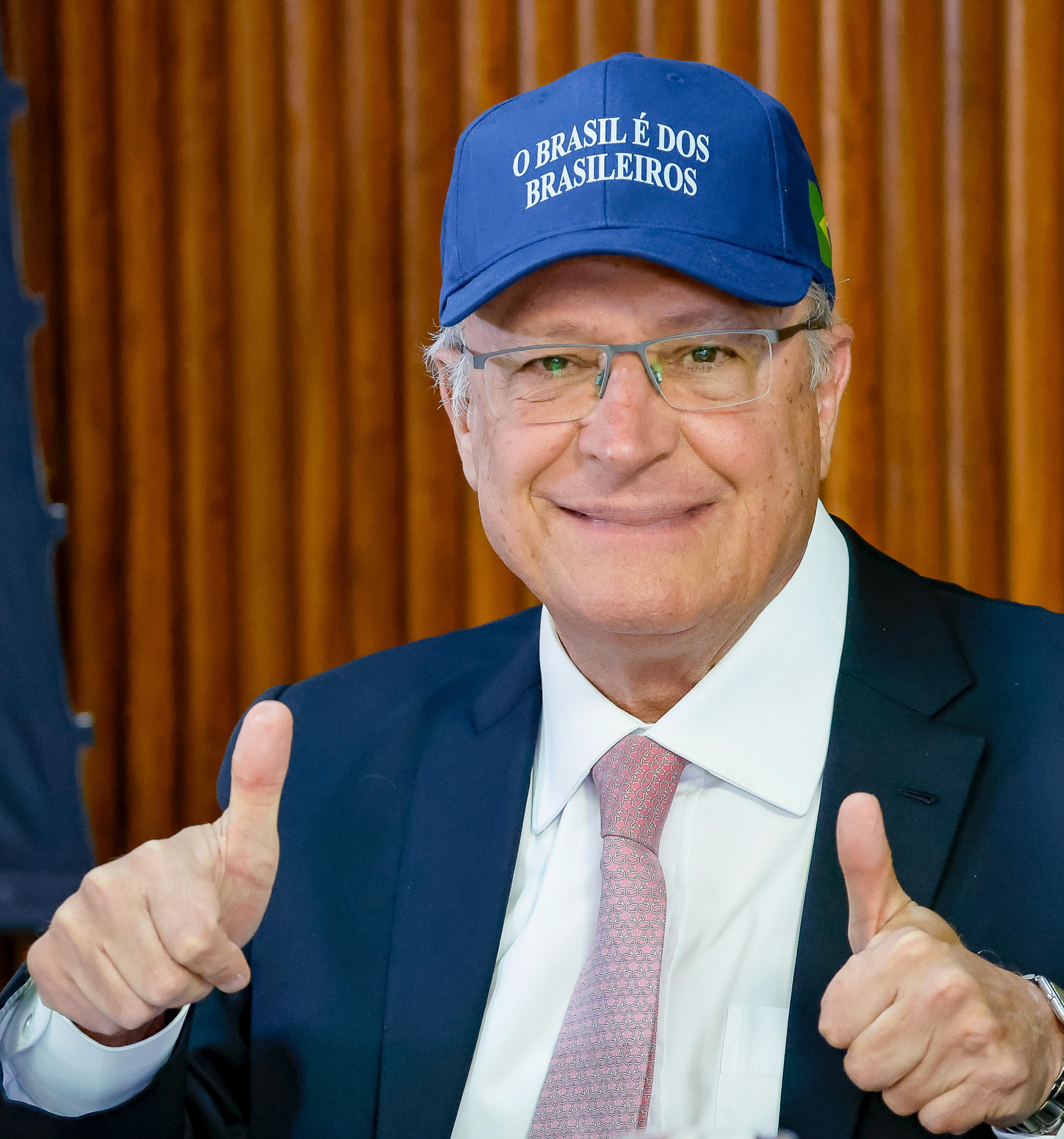
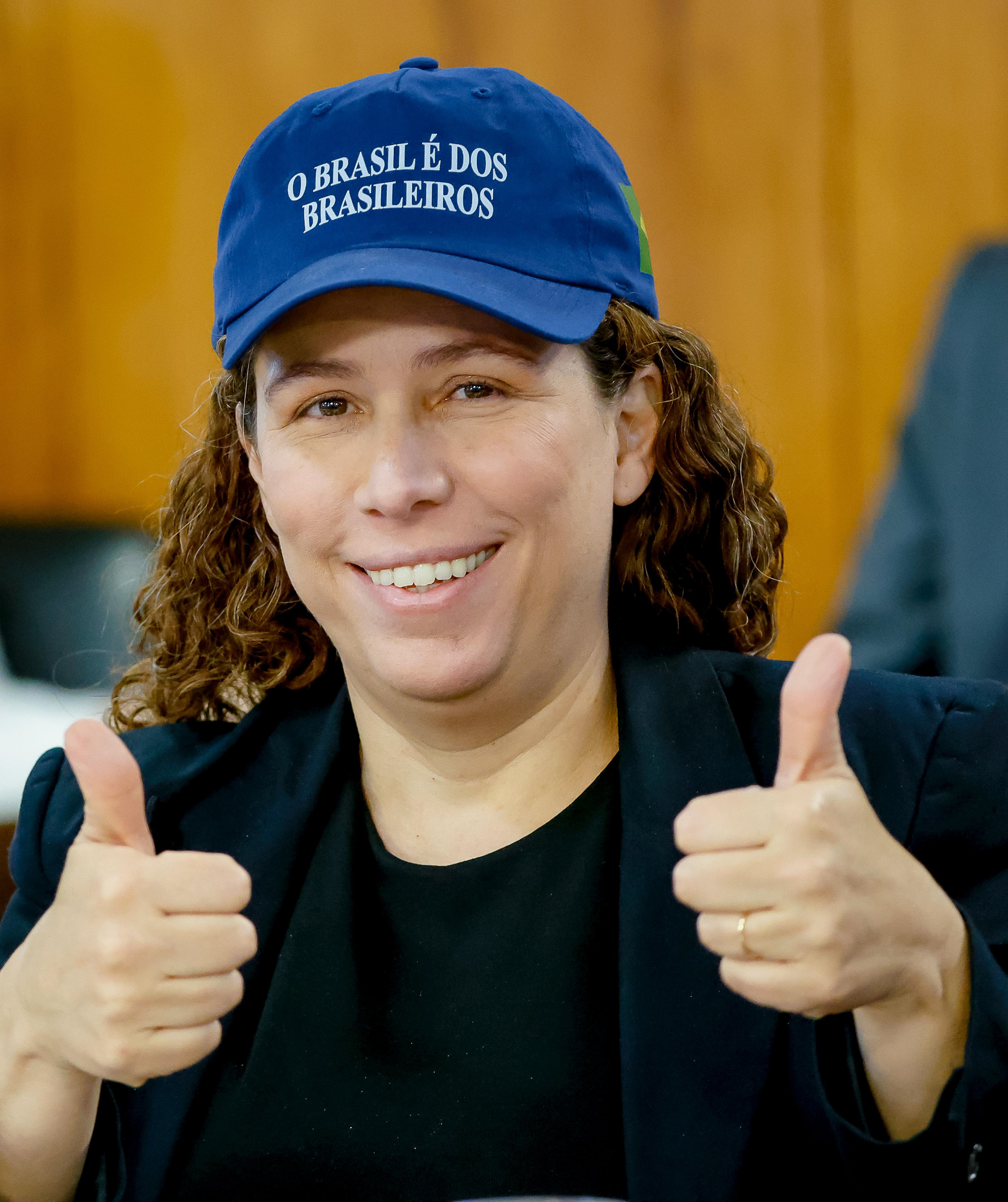
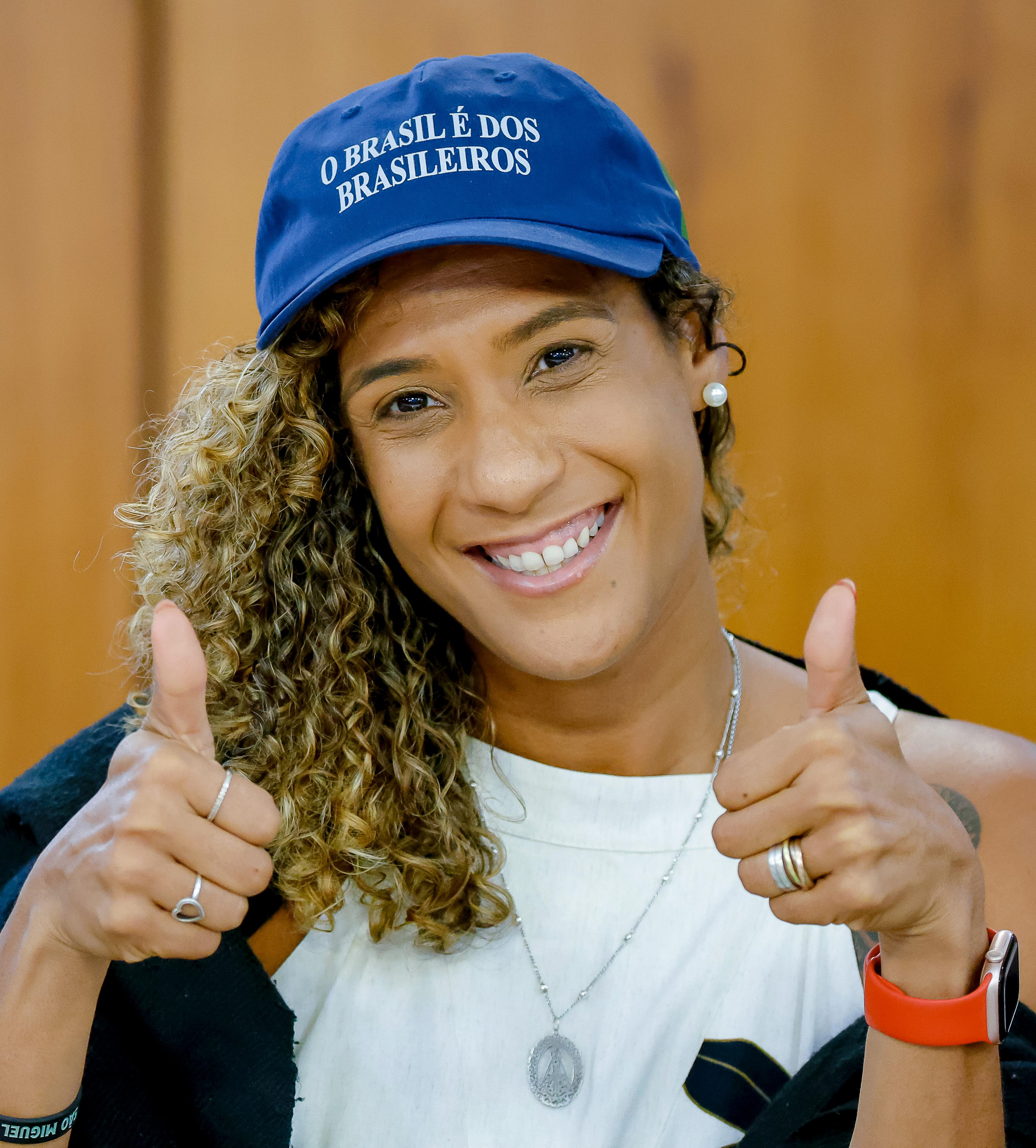
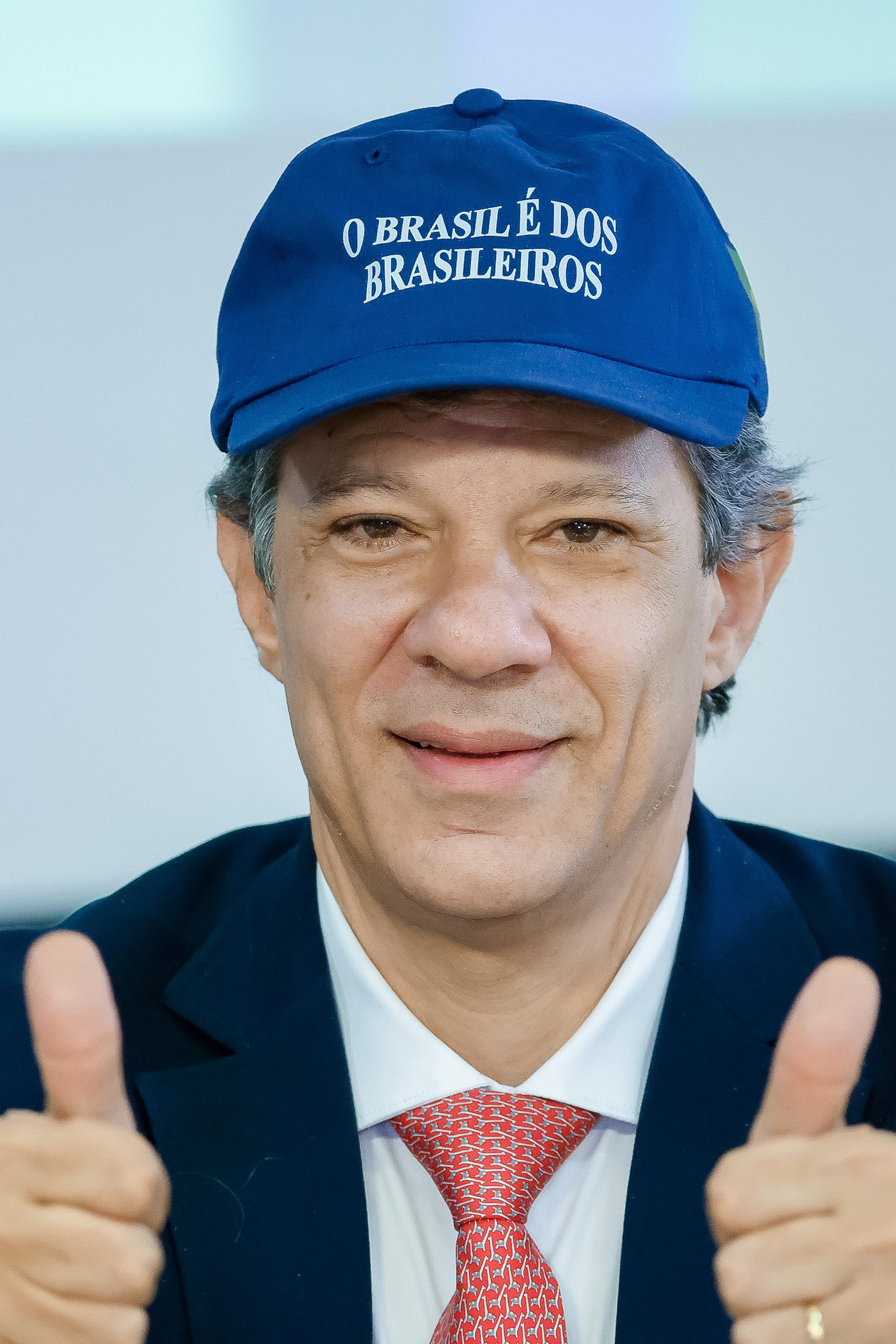
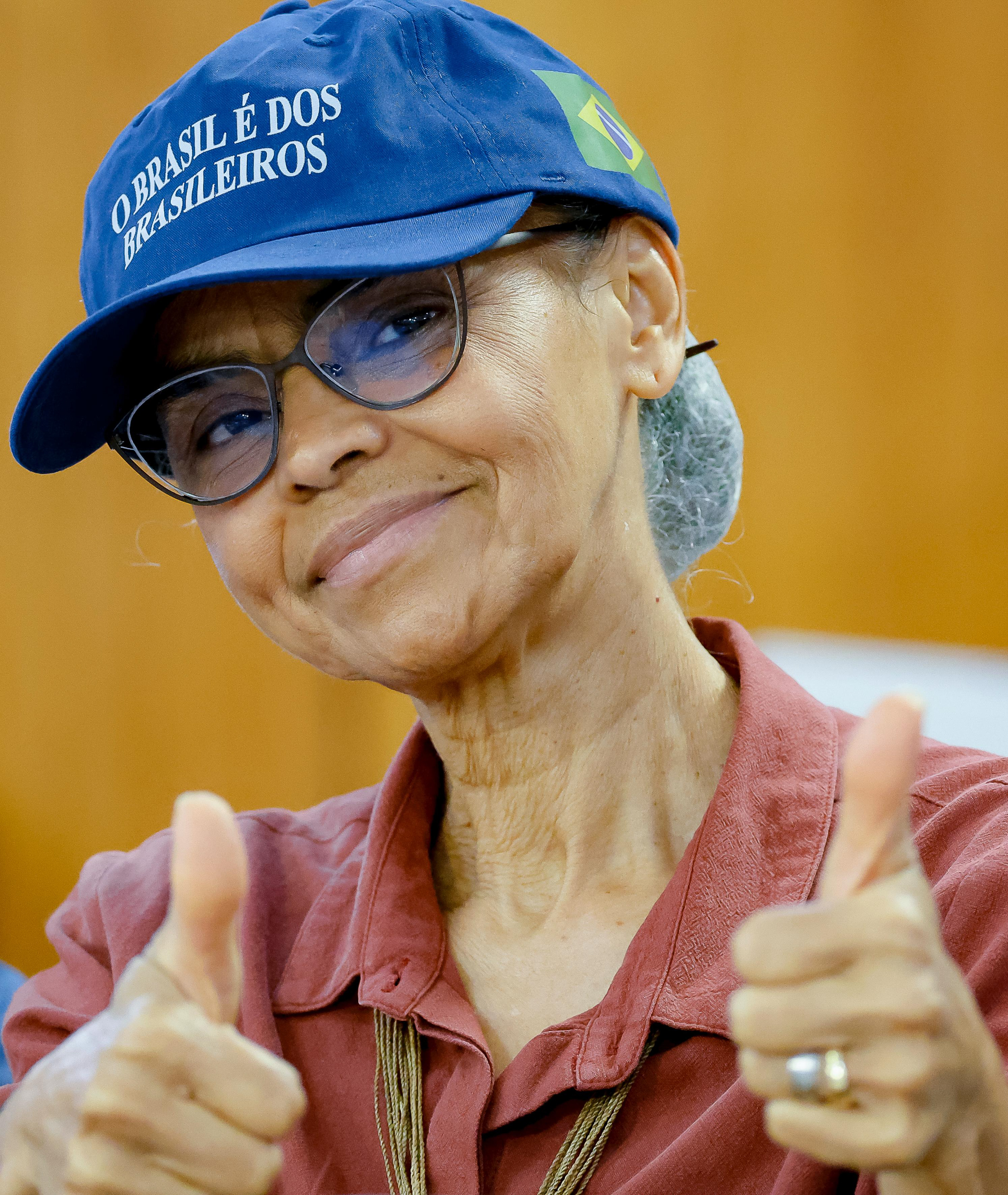
Luiz Inácio Lula da Silva wearing a cap with the phrase "Brazil belongs to Brazilians" (top) and some ministers (bottom); from left, Alckmin, Dweck, Franco, Haddad, and Silva

In early 2025, the Brazilian government's secretary of communication Sidônio Palmeira created the slogan "Brazil belongs to Brazilians" ("O Brasil é dos brasileiros")—printed on blue caps—at the request of then-on-leave secretary of institutional affairs Alexandre Padilha, with the aim of countering the "Make America Great Again" caps. Brazil's president Luiz Inácio Lula da Silva also posted a video on social media wearing the cap, in what has sometimes been referred to as the "battle of the caps" or "cap war". Padilha stated he was distressed to see people "saluting another country", in reference to former president Jair Bolsonaro; also following Trump's inauguration, the governor of São Paulo Tarcísio de Freitas appeared wearing a red cap with the phrase "Make America Great Again". In July of that year, after Trump's tariff hike against Brazil which was described by The Economist as the greatest interference since the Cold War, Lula da Silva adopted a nationalist stance, once again wearing a cap bearing the slogan "Brazil belongs to Brazilians". In August, during the second ministerial meeting of the year, Lula da Silva and his ministers wore the cap in question; the president and all 38 ministers posed for identification-style photographs on the occasion.

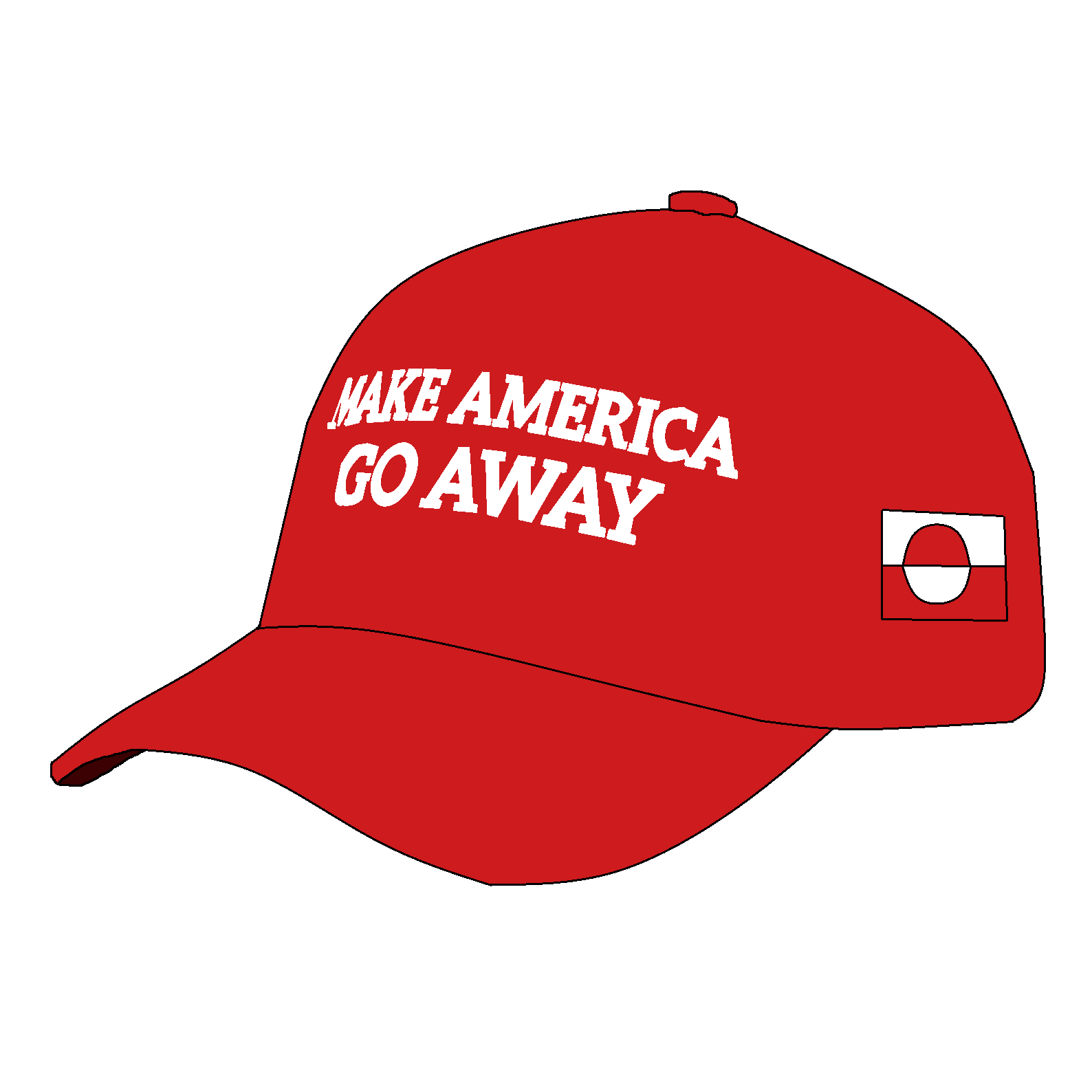
A Make America Go Away hat design, featuring Greenland's flag on the side

The slogan "Make America Go Away" was seen in the 2026 Hands off Greenland protests.

=== Use of the slogan by Trump's political rivals ===
After Donald Trump popularized the use of the phrase, the phrase and modifications of it were widely used in reference both to his election campaign and to his politics. Trump's primary opponents, Ted Cruz and Scott Walker, began using "Make America Great Again" in speeches, inciting Trump to send cease-and-desist letters to them. Cruz later sold hats featuring "Make Trump Debate Again" in response to Trump's boycotting the Iowa January 28, 2016, debate.

New York governor Andrew Cuomo said America "was never that great" during a September 2018 bill signing. Former United States attorney general Eric Holder questioned the slogan in a March 2019 interview on MSNBC, asking: "Exactly when did you think America was great?" During John McCain's memorial service on September 1, 2018, his daughter Meghan stated: "The America of John McCain has no need to be made great again because America was always great." Trump subsequently tweeted "MAKE AMERICA GREAT AGAIN!" later that day. Throughout Donald Trump's presidencies, the phrase "Is America great yet?" has been used both facetiously and as an actual poll question.

During remarks at the White House on May 4, 2022, President Joe Biden referred to former president Trump's Make America Great Again movement, saying, "This MAGA crowd is really the most extreme political organization that's existed in American history, in recent American history." On September 1, 2022, he dedicated remarks at the White House "on the continued battle for the soul of the nation", to attacks on "Donald Trump and the MAGA Republicans", saying that "Donald Trump and the MAGA Republicans represent an extremism that threatens the very foundations of our republic", and that "MAGA Republicans have made their choice. They embrace anger. They thrive on chaos. They live not in the light of truth but in the shadow of lies."

After Florida governor Ron DeSantis announced his run for the 2024 Republican Party presidential primary, several news outlets said he promised to "Make America Florida". One of the most widespread anti-Trump derivatives of "Make America Great Again" during the Trump presidency and the 2020 election was "Make America Think Again", often combined with 2020 Democratic primary candidate Andrew Yang's preferred version of "Make America Think Harder" ("MATH"). The slogan has been spotted at numerous anti-Trump events from Democratic political rallies to marches to social media, with Live Science noting "Think Again" as one of its top hashtags for 2017.

=== "Make America White Again" ===
Australian political commentator and former Liberal Party leader John Hewson used the satirical slogan "Make America White Again" in reference to his belief that recent global movements against traditional politics and politicians are based on racism and prejudice. He wrote: "There should be little doubt about U.S. president Donald Trump's views on race, despite his occasional 'denials', assertions of 'fake news', and/or his semantic distinctions. His election campaign theme was effectively a promise to 'Make America Great Again; America First and Only' and—nod, nod, wink, wink—to Make America White Again." In a bid for attention, a few fringe racist political activists have associated "Make America Great Again" with a return to whiteness.

=== In popular culture ===
==== In advertising ====
The slogan was parodied by Dunk-a-roos as "Make America Dunk Again", and also in the film Sharknado 5: Global Swarming's tagline of "Make America Bait Again."

==== In artwork ====
Make Everything Great Again was a street art mural by artist Mindaugas Bonanu in Vilnius, Lithuania. Inspired by the graffiti painting My God, Help Me to Survive This Deadly Love, it depicts Donald Trump giving a fraternal kiss to the Russian president Vladimir Putin.

==== In fashion ====
Fashion designer Andre Soriano used the "Make America Great Again" official presidential campaign flag to design a MAGA gown for celebrities in Hollywood to wear on red carpet, such as at the 2017 Grammy Awards.

==== In films and web series ====
The tagline for the film The Purge: Election Year (2016) is "Keep America Great" (a phrase Trump would later use as his 2020 campaign slogan); one of the TV spots for the film featured Americans who explain why they support the Purge, with one stating he does so "to keep my country [America] great". The next film in the franchise, The First Purge, was subsequently advertised with a poster featuring its title stylized on a MAGA hat. In The Boys Season 4, the political slogan "Make America Super Again" serves as the main rallying cry for Homelander, the primary antagonist, as he successfully executes his own version of January 6 coup attempt in the universe of The Boys franchise.

==== In literature ====
Author Octavia E. Butler used "Make America Great Again" as the presidential campaign slogan for the dictator Andrew Steele Jarret in her 1998 dystopian novel Parable of the Talents. In 2011, Republican former United States Senate candidate Christine O'Donnell published a book about her campaign in the 2010 Delaware special election titled Troublemaker: Let's Do What It Takes to Make America Great Again. Political advisor Dan Pfeiffer's second book is called Un-Trumping America: A Plan to Make America a Democracy Again. Political commentator and author Peter Beinart published a 2006 book titled The Good Fight: Why Liberals – and Only Liberals – Can Win the War on Terror and Make America Great Again, drawing on the philosophy of theologian Reinhold Niebuhr after the 2003 invasion of Iraq and during the early years of the war on terror.

==== In music ====
Snoop Dogg's second EP is called Make America Crip Again (2017) with the second single titled "M.A.C.A." Dogg was quoted in Rolling Stone as saying that "Make America Great Again" refers to a time in the past that "always takes me back to separation and segregation so I'd rather Make America Crip Again" and referred to a time "when young black men in impoverished areas organized to help their communities and to take care of their own because society basically left them for dead". Singer Joy Villa produced a single "Make America Great Again" a few months after appearing at the 2017 Grammy Awards in a 'MAGA' dress. Australian heavy metal band Thy Art Is Murder recorded a song called "Make America Hate Again" on their album Human Target. YoungBoy Never Broke Again released MASA in 2025 with the backronym of "Make America Slime Again" after he was pardoned by Trump.

==== On television ====
The Star Trek: Discovery episode "What's Past Is Prologue" has Gabriel Lorca vowing in one scene to "Make the Empire glorious again". In the South Park episode "Where My Country Gone?" (2015), supporters of Mr. Garrison, who runs a campaign that is a parody of Trump's, are seen holding signs bearing the slogan.

==== In video games ====
Senator Armstrong, the antagonist of the 2013 video game Metal Gear Rising: Revengeance uses the phrase "make America great again". Wolfenstein II: The New Colossus, a first-person shooter video game with Nazis as the enemy, was given the advertising tagline "Make America Nazi-Free Again", which some people objected to as anti-Trump, though a company executive said the game was not a "social critique on 2017 America." Peters Hines, the studio's vice president of marketing and public relations, was quoted on GamesIndustry.biz as saying, "Wolfenstein has been a decidedly anti-Nazi series since the first release more than 20 years ago. We aren't going to shy away from what the game is about. We don't feel it's a reach for us to say Nazis are bad and un-American, and we're not worried about being on the right side of history here."

In Brawl Stars, a 2025 change to the character Melodie's model, which reduced her height, prompted an online campaign called "Make Melodie Tall Again" (often abbreviated as "#MMTA"), parodying the phrase "Make America Great Again". The campaign called for Supercell to restore Melodie's previous proportions, and became a meme within the Brawl Stars community.

=== Similar slogans used outside the United States ===
During his campaign for the 2019 Indonesian presidential election in October 2018, former opposition leader Prabowo Subianto used the phrase "make Indonesia great again", though he denied having copied Trump. During the Swedish European Parliament election in May 2019, the Christian Democrats party used the slogan "Make EU Lagom Again". The Spanish far-right party Vox used "Hacer a España grande otra vez" (Make Spain Great Again) as a slogan.

During the 2020 Trinidad and Tobago general election campaign, the Leader of the Opposition and former prime minister Kamla Persad-Bissessar, who has been accused as attempting to be a "wannabe Trinidad and Tobago Trump," used the phrase "Make T&T (Trinidad and Tobago) great again!" Following Donald Trump's victory in the 2024 United States presidential election, she described his win as an effort to "restore conservative American values and ideals, which have been under attack by promoters of extreme far-left ideology." In Singapore, the slogan "Make Yishun Great Again" was used by content creators as a running joke where the town itself has a stereotype for being dangerous. There were hats sold with the phrase. Similarly, People's Power Party, a political party in Singapore, used a variant of the slogan, "Make Singapore Home Again" for their party's manifesto and campaign during the 2025 Singaporean general election.

The right-wing populist United Australia Party used the slogans "Make Australia Great" and "Make Australia Great Again" during the 2019 and 2022 Australian federal elections. Coalition senator Jacinta Nampijinpa Price used the phrase "make Australia great again" during the 2025 federal election campaign. At a later press conference, she said she hadn't "even realise[d]" she said the phrase and accused media outlets of being "obsessed with Donald Trump". In Israel, the Israeli far-right has used the similar expression "Make Israel Great Again" along with the acronym MIGA. In Mongolia, Khaltmaagiin Battulga used as his 2017 presidential election campaign slogan "Монгол Ялна" (Mongol Yalna, "Mongolia Will Win"), with its abbreviation "Мояа" (Moya) being a derivative term. The 2024 Hungarian Presidency of the Council of the European Union used the motto "Make Europe Great Again" (MEGA). In the Philippines, Isko Moreno used the slogan "Make Manila Great Again" for his mayoral campaign during the 2025 Manila local elections.

During the 2023 presidential campaign of Javier Milei in Argentina, his party adopted the slogan MAGA as "Make Argentina Great Again". Milei, who is a personal friend and an admirer of Trump, won the election in November 2023. Trump sent a congratulatory message to Milei and Argentines using the slogan "Make Argentina Great Again".

In January 2025, during an Alternative für Deutschland (AfD) campaign rally for the 2025 German federal election, Elon Musk spoke at the event through a video call, reiterating his previous endorsement of the party. Following his short speech, Alice Weidel, the leading AfD candidate for the upcoming elections, thanked Musk and used the derived expression "Make Germany great again". In February 2025, Indian prime minister Narendra Modi used the derivative "Make India Great Again" during a bilateral meeting with Trump, saying: "Borrowing an expression from the US, our vision for a developed India is to 'Make India Great Again', or MIGA. When America and India work together, when it's MAGA plus MIGA, it becomes mega – a mega partnership for prosperity." An April 2025 article by The Economist which introduced the impact of the second Trump administration tariffs in China was entitled "How America could end up making China great again". In Syria, a billboard was seen in Damascus during the visit of U.S. Republican congressman Cory Mills, displaying the phrase "Make Syria Great Again." In an interview with the Jewish Journal on May 28, 2025, Syrian president Ahmed al-Sharaa said he accepted the role to help rebuild Syria, stating, "We have no choice but to succeed", and used the phrase "We must make Syria great again".

In May 2026, when Trump was visiting China, Chinese leader Xi Jinping said that the "great rejuvenation of the Chinese nation" and "Make America great again" can go hand in hand.

==== Make Iran Great Again ====
The slogan "Make Iran Great Again" has been used by the Iranian opposition group Restart since at least 2020. In 2025, U.S. president Donald Trump also made use of the slogan to advocate for the replacement of the Islamic regime ruling Iran.

In January 2026, Republican senator and Trump ally Lindsey Graham publicly adopted the slogan. In an interview with Fox News, Graham put on a "Make Iran Great Again" hat and said that he hoped 2026 would be the year that Iran was made great again. The hat featured the Lion and Sun flag dating from before the 1979 Iranian Revolution, and Graham expressed support for the Iranian protesters and opposition to the Islamic Republic. Graham subsequently posted a photograph of himself with Trump, who was holding the signed MIGA hat, and described it as a symbol of support for the Iranian protesters.

==== Make Cuba Great Again ====
The slogan "Make Cuba Great Again" has been used by Cuban opposition activists and Cuban-American entrepreneurs since at least 2019. Cuban-American entrepreneur Luis Manuel Esperon used the slogan on clothing and other merchandise as a message supporting political change in Cuba, drawing on the slogan of U.S. president Donald Trump. The slogan was subsequently used by Cuban activists and members of the Cuban diaspora advocating an end to communist rule and political change in Cuba.

In 2026, the slogan became increasingly associated with support for the Trump administration's tougher policy toward the Cuban government. In February 2026, Cuban-American Trump supporters demonstrated in Miami calling on Trump to take action against the Cuban government, with one vehicle displaying a sign reading "TRUMP DO IT MAKE CUBA GREAT AGAIN". Cuban opposition figure Rosa María Payá also used the phrase in March 2026 while calling on Trump to maintain pressure on the Cuban government and support the establishment of a democratic republic in Cuba.

The slogan also appeared during the Trump administration's escalation of economic pressure on Cuba. In May 2026, Trump imposed additional sanctions on Cuban government officials and entities, citing repression, corruption, and threats to U.S. national security and foreign policy. In August 2026, the administration expanded the sanctions to additional Cuban state-owned entities and officials.

== See also ==
- America is back – Political catchphrase
- American Century – Term for American geopolitical dominance
- American decline – Idea that the United States is diminishing in power
- Declinism – Belief that something is tending towards decline
- Democratic backsliding in the United States
- Generation gap – Difference of opinions between generations
- List of political slogans
- Pax Americana – Historical concept
- Post-Western era – Conjectured era without Western dominance
- Rosy retrospection – Disproportionate favor towards the past
