= Amy Wilentz =

American journalist and writer

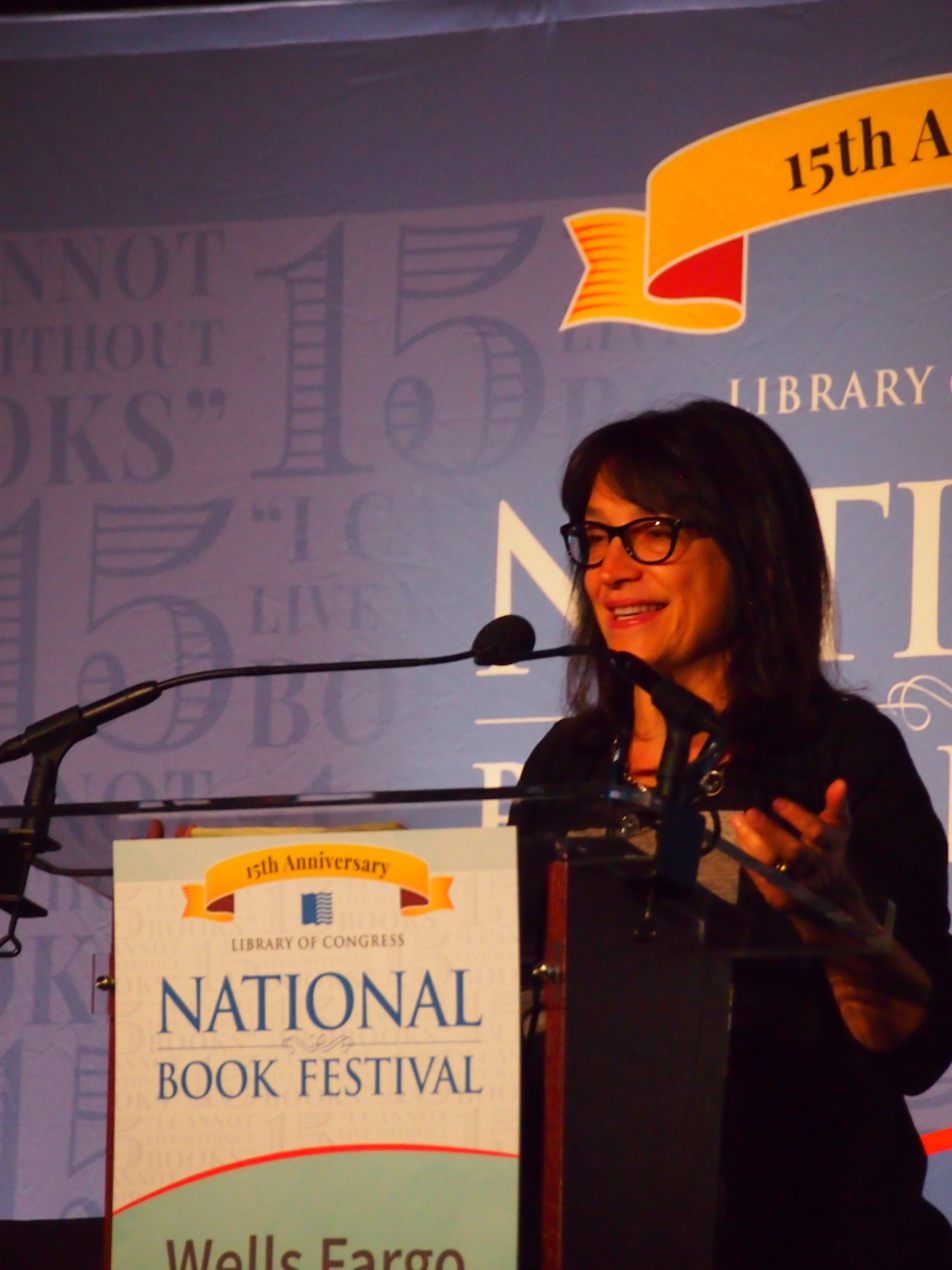
- Occupations: Writer, journalist
- Spouse: Nicholas Goldberg
- Relatives: David T. Wilentz (grandfather)
- Writing career
- Language: English
- Notable works: Farewell, Fred Voodoo: A Letter From Haiti, I Feel Earthquakes More Often Than They Happen: Coming to California in the Age of Schwarzenegger
- Notable awards: National Book Critics Circle Award (autobiography); 2013 Farewell, Fred Voodoo: A Letter From Haiti

Amy Wilentz is an American journalist and writer. She is a professor of English at the University of California, Irvine, where she teaches Literary Journalism. Wilentz received a 2013 National Book Critics Circle Award for her memoir, Farewell, Fred Voodoo: A Letter from Haiti, as well as a 2020 Guggenheim Fellowship in General Nonfiction. Wilentz is The New Yorker's former Jerusalem correspondent and is a contributing editor at The Nation.

== Early life and education ==
Wilentz is the daughter of Robert Wilentz and Jacqueline Malino Wilentz. Her father was chief justice of the New Jersey Supreme Court from 1979 to 1996; her mother was a painter. She was raised in Perth Amboy, New Jersey. Wilentz is also the granddaughter of David T. Wilentz, the New Jersey attorney general from 1934 to 1944, best known for prosecuting Bruno Hauptmann in the Lindbergh kidnapping trial. She attended Harvard for undergraduate study in 1976, where she wrote for The Harvard Crimson. She spent a year after graduation on a Harvard/Radcliffe fellowship at the Ecole Normale Supérieure in Paris, France.

== Career ==
Wilentz's first jobs in journalism were for The Nation, Newsday, and Time. She also worked for Ben Sonnenberg's literary periodical Grand Street in its early years. Wilentz has covered events in Haiti for many years, from the fall of Jean-Claude Duvalier in 1986 through the 2010 earthquake and Duvalier's death in 2014.

Her work has appeared in The New York Times, The Los Angeles Times, Time, The New Republic, Mother Jones, Harper's, Vogue, Condé Nast Traveler, Travel & Leisure, San Francisco Chronicle, The Village Voice, The London Review of Books, The Huffington Post, Democracy: A Journal of Ideas, and The Spectator.

Wilentz is the author of two books on Haiti, The Rainy Season: Haiti Since Duvalier (1989) and Farewell, Fred Voodoo: A Letter from Haiti (2013). She is the translator of In the Parish of the Poor: Writings from Haiti, by Jean-Bertrand Aristide (1991). She continues to write frequently about Haiti, most often for The Nation.

Martyrs’ Crossing, Wilentz's novel about the Oslo peace process in Jerusalem in the mid-1990s, was published in 2000. Her memoir, I Feel Earthquakes More Often Than They Happen: Coming to California in the Age of Schwarzenegger was published in 2006.

== Personal life ==
Wilentz is married to Nicholas Goldberg, opinion editor of the Los Angeles Times.

== Awards ==
- 1990 Whiting Award
- 1990 PEN/Martha Albrand Award for First Nonfiction for The Rainy Season
- 2000 Rosenthal Award, American Academy of Arts and Letters for Martyrs' Crossing
- 1989 National Book Critics Circle Award, General Nonfiction finalist
- 2013 National Book Critics Circle Award (Autobiography/Memoir), winner for Farewell, Fred Voodoo
- 2020 Guggenheim Fellowship in General Nonfiction

== Works ==
=== Books ===
- Farewell, Fred Voodoo: A Letter From Haiti. Simon & Schuster. January 8, 2013. ISBN 978-1-451-64397-8.
- I Feel Earthquakes More Often Than They Happen: Coming to California in the Age of Schwarzenegger. Simon and Schuster. 2006. ISBN 978-0-7432-6439-6.
- Martyrs' Crossing. Simon & Schuster. 2001. ISBN 978-0-684-85436-6.
- The Rainy Season: Haiti Since Duvalier. Simon and Schuster. 1989. ISBN 978-0-671-64186-3.

=== Anthologies ===
- Robert Maguire and Scott Freeman, ed. (2017). Who Owns Haiti?: People, Power, and Sovereignty. Contributor Amy Wilentz. University Press of Florida. ISBN 978-0813062266.
- The Nation's 150th Anniversary Special Issue (2015). Contributor Amy Wilentz: "The Future of a Failed State".
- Jeff Sharlet, ed. (2014). Radiant Truths: Essential Dispatches, Reports, Confessions, and Other Essays on American Belief. Contributor Amy Wilentz. Yale University Press. ISBN 978-0300169218.
- Richard Stengel, ed. (2010). Haiti: Tragedy and Hope. Contributor Amy Wilentz. Time Books. ISBN 978-1-60320-163-6.
- Susan Morrison, ed. (2008). Thirty Ways of Looking at Hillary: Reflections by Women Writers. Contributor Amy Wilentz. HarperCollins. ISBN 978-0-06-145593-3.
- Jean-Bertrand Aristide (1990). In the parish of the poor: writings from Haiti. Translator Amy Wilentz. Orbis Books. ISBN 978-0-88344-682-9.
- Anne Fuller; Amy Wilentz (1991). Return to the Darkest Days: Human Rights in Haiti Since the Coup. Human Rights Watch. ISBN 978-1-56432-054-4.
