= Pakistan khappay =

Pakistani political slogan

Pakistan khappay (Urdu: پاکستان کھپے Sindhi: پاڪستان کپي) is a Sindhi language phrase which means "We want Pakistan".

== Origin and usage ==
The term was first used and coined by the President Asif Ali Zardari. Since then phrase has become important part of Zardari's speech.

== Criticism ==
Critics of Asif Ali Zardari and PPP question if he meant a Punjabi meaning or a Sindhi meaning when he said ‘Pakistan Khappay’. People’s confusion regarding this word “khappay” has increased since Zardari has delivered speeches, first in Faisalabad on 17 January 2010 and then in Talagang (Danda Shah Bilawal) on 21 January 2010, when he gave speeches in Punjabi on both occasions and he used this phrase.

== Other media ==
Munir Ahmad Memon wrote a book with name Pakistan Khappay and presented it to Nisar Ahmad Khuhro.
