= Four new inventions =

Untrue 2017 Chinese propaganda slogan

The term Four new inventions (Chinese: 新四大发明; pinyin: xīn sì dà fāmíng) is a slogan promoted by Chinese state media, drawing inspiration from the Four Great Inventions of ancient China. In 2017, Chinese state media began asserting that mainland China "invented" high-speed rail, mobile payment, e-commerce, and bike-sharing. However, none of the technologies underlying these "four new inventions" originated in mainland China. However, Xiamen University Professor Xu Gongcheng argues, China "used these technologies to come up with the new inventions", and China "has outpaced other countries in the widespread adoption and adaptation" of these technologies.

== High-speed rail ==
High-speed rail is a type of rail transport that operates significantly faster than traditional rail systems, utilizing an integrated system of specialized rolling stock and dedicated tracks. The European Union defines "high-speed" as a minimum of 250 km/h on new tracks and 200 km/h on older tracks. The world's first high-speed train, the Tōkaidō Shinkansen in Japan, began service in 1964 with a maximum speed of 210 km/h.

In mainland China, "high-speed" is defined as a design speed of at least 250 km/h, with a minimum operational speed of 200 km/h during initial service. In 2008, the first Chinese high-speed railway, the Beijing–Tianjin intercity railway, began operations. By 2016, China claimed to have the largest high-speed rail system in the world.

== E-commerce ==
E-commerce was invented in 1979 by Michael Aldrich. The first online store, NetMarket, was launched in 1994.

E-commerce in mainland China began in 1999 with platforms like Dangdang and Joyo.com (now Amazon China). In 2003, Jack Ma founded Taobao, followed by the establishment of 360buy (now JD.com) in 2004.

== Mobile payment ==
Mobile payment generally refers to payment services that are operated under financial regulations and conducted using a mobile device. The concept originated in Finland in 1997.

In mainland China, mobile payments began in the early 21st century, with Alipay and WeChat Pay being the most prominent platforms. According to statistics, the market penetration of mobile payments is 77% in mainland China, compared to 48% in the United States and 27% in Japan.

== Bike-sharing ==
A bike-sharing system is a service that provides bicycles for short-term use at a fee. The first bike-sharing system, known as the "White Bicycle Plan," was introduced in Amsterdam in 1965.

In mainland China, the bike-sharing system began with Ofo in 2014, followed by Mobike in 2015.
