= Nicholas Goldberg =

American journalist

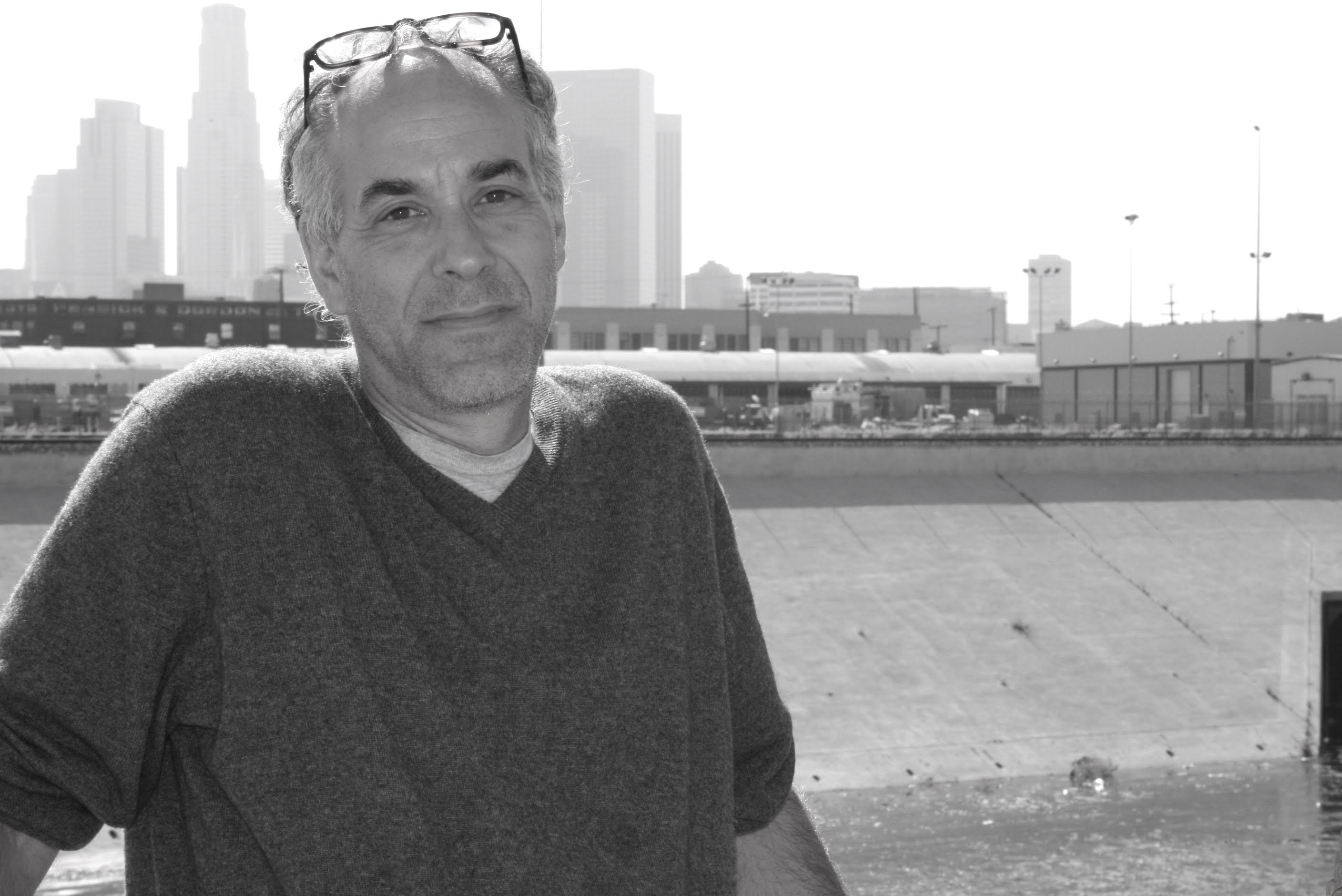
- Born: November 6, 1958 (age 67); New York City
- Education: Harvard University
- Occupations: Reporter, editor
- Spouse: Amy Wilentz

Nicholas Goldberg (born November 6, 1958) is an American journalist, and is currently an associate editor and Op-Ed columnist for the Los Angeles Times. His writing has been published in the New Republic, New York Times, Vanity Fair, the Nation, Sunday Times of London and Washington Monthly, among other places. He wrote his last column for the Los Angeles Times on June 30, 2023.

== Early life and education ==
Goldberg was born and raised in New York City. He is the son of Richard Goldberg, who lives in Wiesbaden Germany, and the late Uli Beigel Monaco. He graduated from Harvard University in 1980 with a bachelor's degree in government.

== Career ==
Goldberg is a former reporter and editor at Newsday in New York, which he joined in 1983. There, he covered the 1992 presidential campaign of Bill Clinton and served as New York's state house bureau chief in Albany, covering the administrations of Governors Mario Cuomo and George Pataki.

From 1995 to 1998, he worked as Newsday's Middle East bureau chief based in Jerusalem. While in this position, he covered the Israeli-Palestinian peace process; presidential elections in Iran; arms monitoring in Iraq; famine in Sudan; civil war in Algeria; war in Lebanon; and the rise of Islamic fundamentalism in Saudi Arabia.

Between 1999 and 2002, Goldberg served as a director of Penn, Schoen & Berland Associates and then as senior Vice President of Benenson Strategy Group conducting polls, focus groups, and other strategic research for political candidates, not-for-profit organizations, and corporations.

He was hired by The Los Angeles Times in 2002 to be editor of the op-ed page. He became deputy editorial page editor in 2008. A year later, he was named editor of the editorial pages. As editor, he oversaw the editorial board, letters, and the op-ed and Sunday opinion sections.

In 2020, he became an op-ed columnist and associate editor of the paper.

Goldberg is a member of the Council on Foreign Relations. He also serves on the board of The Marshall Project, a Pulitzer Prize-winning nonprofit online journalism organization focusing on issues related to criminal justice in the United States.

== Personal life ==
He and his wife, the writer Amy Wilentz, live in Los Angeles. He has three grown sons. He is Jewish.

== Publications ==
Goldberg's writing has been published in The Los Angeles Times, The New Republic, The New York Times, Vanity Fair, The Nation, The Chicago Tribune, The Seattle Times, The Sunday Times of London, and Washington Monthly, among other publications.
