= Febuhari 14 =

Febuhari 14 was a political slogan in Nigeria that saw use in 2015. It is a pun; "fe" in the Yoruba language means love, and Muhammadu Buhari was a leading Nigerian opposition candidate in the February 14, 2015 elections in Nigeria. "Love of Buhari" thus dovetails with the original date of the elections, which was Valentine's Day. In addition to the spoken jingle, the hashtag #Febuhari has been used on Twitter and other social media platforms more than a million times, and many youths used it to support the opposition Presidential candidate.

The relevant plebiscite was actually postponed to March 28 due to some reports of the military's unavailability to protect INEC officials. The Nigerian military is currently fighting Boko Haram sects in northeast Nigeria.
