= Strong and stable =

British political slogan

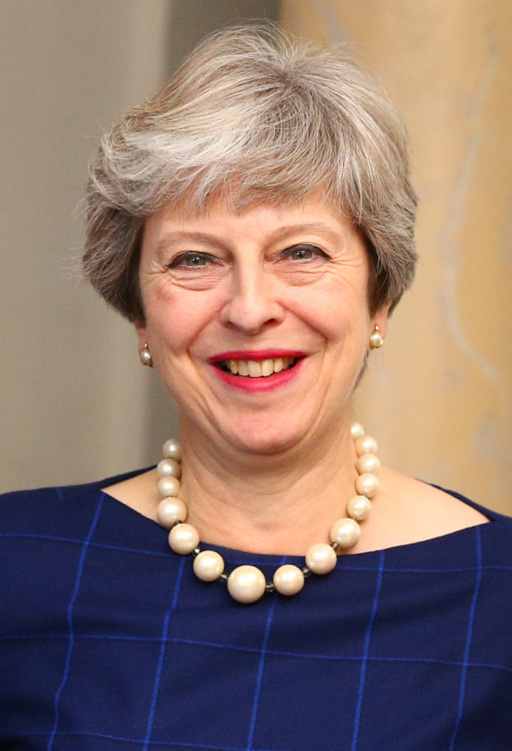
Theresa May in 2017

"Strong and stable" or "strong and stable leadership" was a phrase often used by the prime minister of the United Kingdom Theresa May in the run up to the 2017 general election.

The slogan was criticised often by opponents of May, for its perceived robotic delivery and contradictory nature, also becoming an Internet meme.

== Origins ==
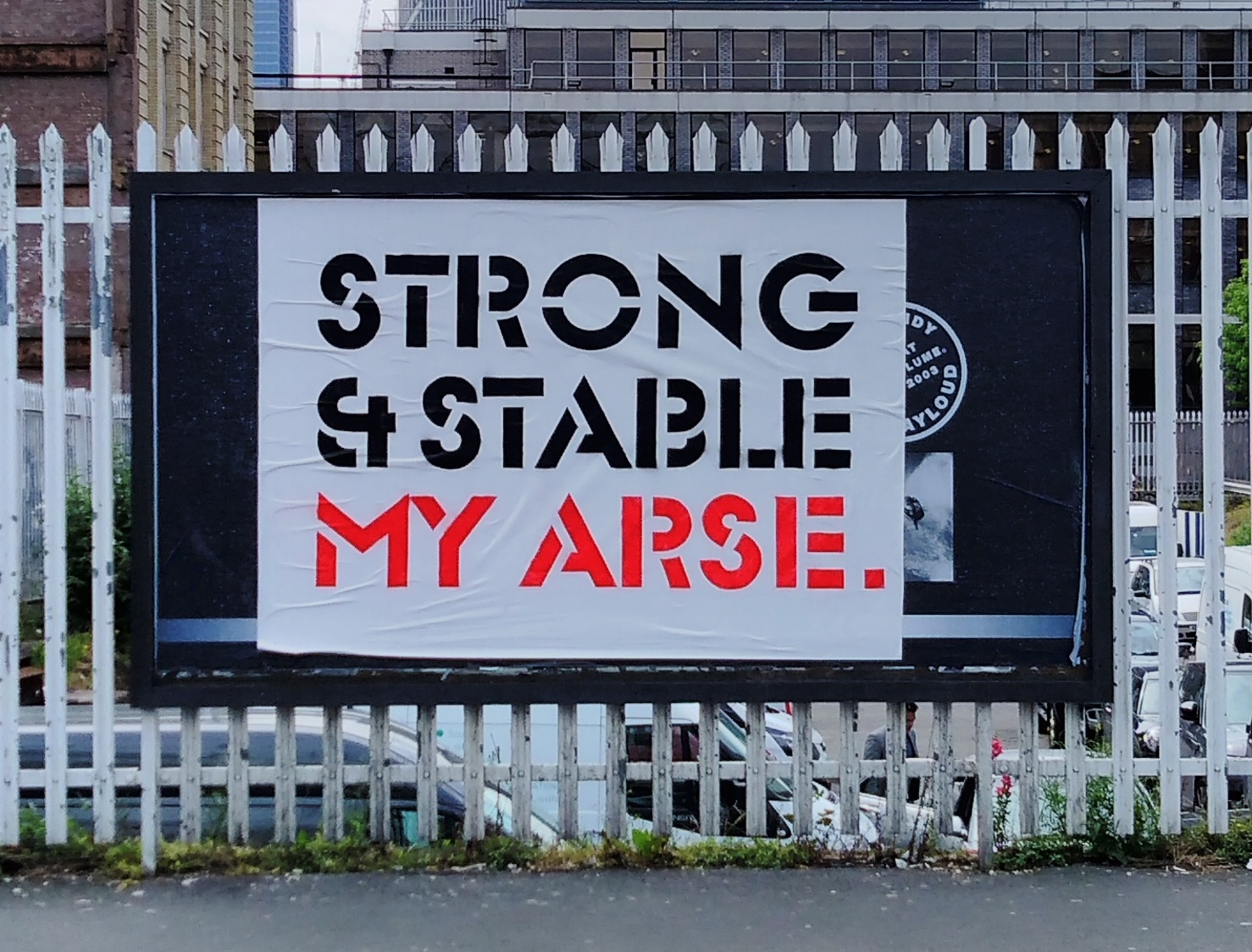
Poster in Shoreditch, London, mocking the phrase during the election campaign

According to the Financial Times, the phrase may have originated from former Prime Minister David Cameron's resignation speech after the UK voted to leave the European Union: "stability ... strong, determined and committed leadership". David Cutts, professor of political science at the University of Birmingham, has described the phrase as an example of compressing information to provide helpful cues to voters and reduce the time needed to acquire information. Gordon Brown used "strong and stable" in his resignation speech in 2010. David Cameron said the Cameron–Clegg coalition would provide "strong and stable" leadership.

== Use by Theresa May and others ==
"Strong and stable" was described as a cliché and led to criticism that May was an ineffective political campaigner who could only talk in slogans. In an interview with the BBC's Andrew Marr, May was stopped after saying "strong and stable" in the first 30 seconds, and was asked to not use sound bites. During a Commons debate, Labour MP Paul Flynn sarcastically asked the chamber, through Speaker John Bercow, if a microchip had been planted in Conservative MPs' heads to repeat "strong and stable" every 18 seconds.

Artist Jeremy Deller designed a poster parodying the phrase and mocking the government's Brexit process. At a press conference during the election campaign, a reporter suggested that May was "weak and wobbly" rather than "strong and stable". This was repeated by other news outlets. At another point in the election campaign, a man presented opposition leader Jeremy Corbyn with two bananas, one bearing the word "strong" and the other with the word "stable." Corbyn found the incident amusing even though the man had intended to suggest that his politics were bananas.

After the election, May reportedly wanted to drop her "strong and stable" slogan because she felt it was making her look "stupid", and it was widely considered that the phrase had been overused and was becoming ever less effective.

Guy Verhofstadt, the European Parliament's coordinator for Brexit-related affairs, parodied the phrase by saying "Any Brexit deal requires a strong and stable understanding of the complex issues involved".

== Later use ==
The phrase was still being associated with May in 2019, the year of her resignation as prime minister.

The Guardian quipped, on a book collecting a few years of John Crace's politics sketches:

"Brexit means Brexit." "Strong and stable." "I don't think I'm in the least robotic." Ever since Theresa May first whirred into inaction as prime minister, there has only been one reliable source of strength and stability: John Crace's political sketches for the Guardian.

— John Crace (3 May 2018). I, Maybot: the rise and fall. London. ISBN 978-1-78335-159-6.

== Bibliography ==
- John Crace (3 May 2018). I, Maybot: the rise and fall. London. ISBN 978-1-78335-159-6.
