= Last Best West =

Phrase

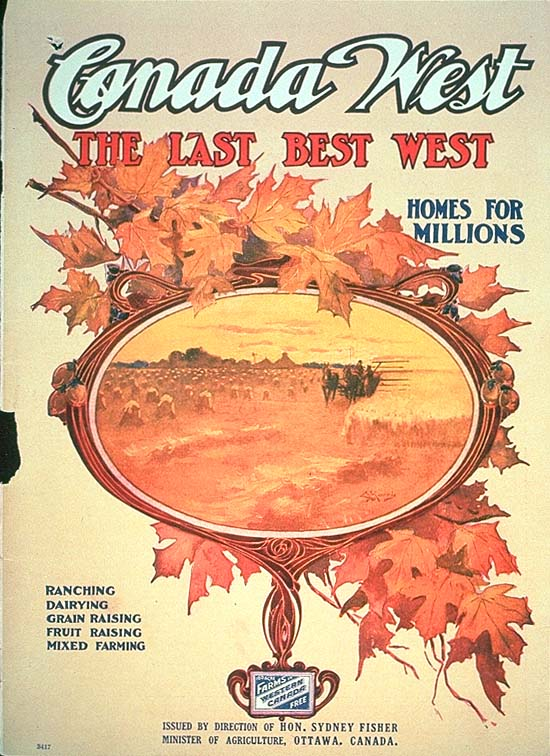
Pamphlet advertising the Last Best West

"Last Best West" was a phrase used to market the Canadian prairies to prospective immigrants. The phrase was used to advertise the Canadian west abroad, and in Eastern Canada, during the heyday of western settlement from 1896 until the start of the First World War in 1914, when few could leave Europe.

One of the key considerations for the government in this recruitment of settlers was the fear that Americans would stream North and settle the southern parts of what would become the provinces of Alberta and Saskatchewan. The goal was to encourage families, and therefore make it hospitable for women who could edify and purify the frontier.

The program was so successful that little more than nine years later the provinces of Alberta and Saskatchewan were formed out of the enormous North-West Territories of Canada.

Printed on pamphlets distributed in Northern Europe, Britain and the United States, the campaign was operated by the Minister of the Interior Clifford Sifton, appointed by Prime Minister Wilfrid Laurier to oversee settlement of the west. "The Last Best West" was a direct comparison to the United States. While there were still tracts of land available in the U.S., most of the best land had been taken and the American frontier had been declared closed in 1890. The land in Canada was the last region still not populated by Europeans.

The phrase was for the most part a marketing ploy. However, even though the frost-free season is shorter in Canada, a less arid climate compensates for this and the Canadian prairies have long been more productive than those of the Dakotas and Wyoming. In addition, unlike the American West, the settlement of the Canadian west was well organized, with the North-West Mounted Police providing law and order.

== See also ==
- Dominion Lands Act
- Manifest destiny

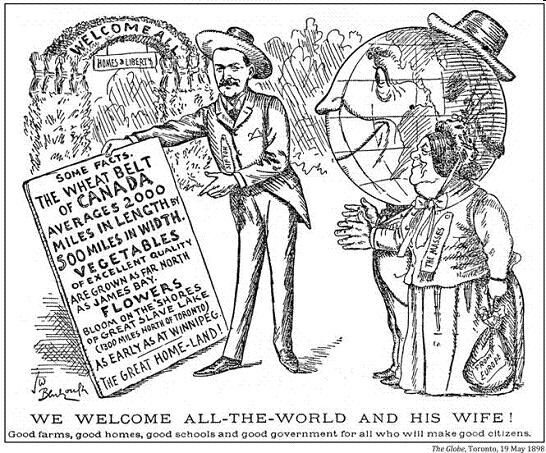
Canada sought immigrants from Europe, especially farmers; cartoon by John Wilson Bengough from Toronto Globe 19 May 1898
