= Huey Long in culture =

Huey Long, governor of Louisiana and US senator, has inspired or been portrayed in numerous cultural works. He has served as the template for fascistic politicians in novels like It Can't Happen Here (1935), A Lion Is in the Streets (1945), and All the King's Men (1946). The latter two were adapted into Oscar-winning films.

He has also been the subject of award-winning biographies, such as T. Harry Williams's Huey Long (1970), which won the Pulitzer Prize. Ken Burns directed a 1985 documentary about Long.

== Literature ==
=== It Can't Happen Here ===
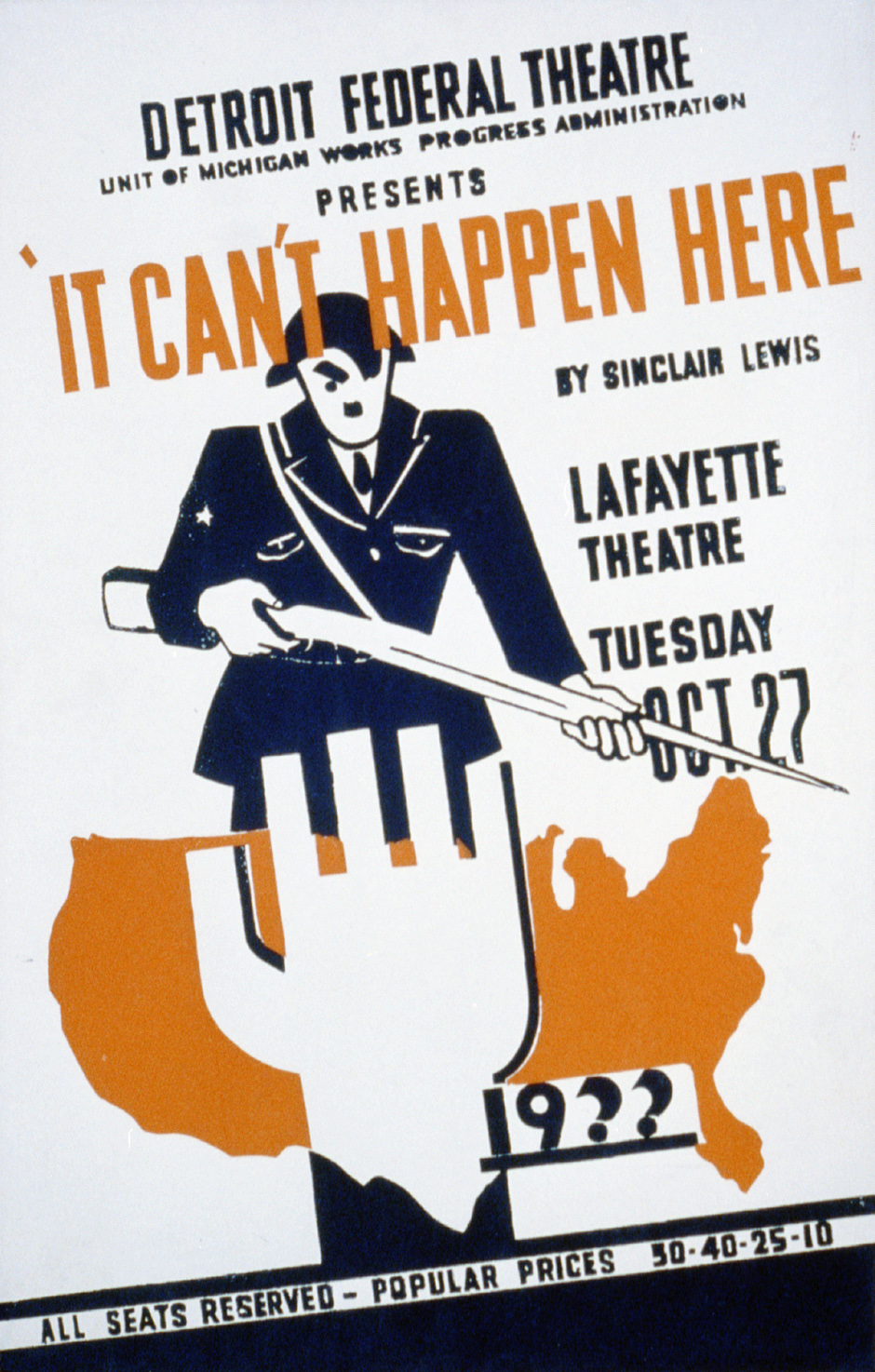
1936 poster for the WPA stage adaptation of It Can't Happen Here

In popular culture, Long has served as a template for multiple populist, or fascistic, fictional politicians.

He is widely believed to be the inspiration for Buzz Windrip in Sinclair Lewis' novel It Can't Happen Here (1935). Windrip is a populist, big business-bashing senator who wins the 1936 election by promising every American family $5,000 per year. Written with the goal of hurting Long's chances in the 1936 election, a stage adaptation was performed in theaters across the country by the Works Progress Administration (WPA). Garry Boulard believed him to be the inspiration for Buzz Windrip in Sinclair Lewis's It Can't Happen Here, calling the work "the most chilling and uncanny treatment of Huey by a writer".

Lewis, a liberal who in 1930 had won the Nobel Prize in literature, portrayed a genuine American dictator on the Hitler model. Lewis's novel outfits President Berzelius Windrip with a private militia, concentration camps, and a chief of staff who sounds like Nazi propagandist Joseph Goebbels. Lewis also outfits Windrip with a racist ideology completely alien to Long and a Main Street conservatism he also never embraced. Ultimately, Windrip is a venal and cynical showman who plays to the conformist resentments Lewis diagnosed in Main Street and Babbitt.

Perry (2004) argues that the key weakness of the novel is not that he decks out American politicians with sinister European touches, but that he finally conceives of fascism and totalitarianism in terms of traditional American political models rather than seeing them as introducing a new kind of society and a new kind of regime. Windrip is less a Nazi than a con-man and manipulator who knows how to appeal to people's desperation, but neither he nor his followers are in the grip of the kind of world-transforming ideology like Hitler's National Socialism.

=== Other novels ===
After his assassination, Long continued to inspire novelists. One of the earliest was John Dos Passos' Number One (1943). Robert Penn Warren's Pulitzer prize-winning novel All the King's Men (1946) featured demagogue Willie Stark, who many believe was based on Long. Warren did not encourage association of his character with Long. In a 1964 interview, he told Charles Bohner: "Willie Stark was not Huey Long. Willie was only himself, whatever that self turned out to be." The novel was adapted into a 1949 movie, which won Best Picture, Best Actor, and Best Supporting Actress from the Academy Awards. It was also adapted into a more recent 2006 film and the 1981 opera Willie Stark by American composer Carlisle Floyd.

Adria Locke Langley's 1945 novel A Lion Is in the Streets featured the Huey Long-like populist politician Hank Martin. The 1953 film adaption starred James Cagney.

Hamilton Basso wrote two novels looking at Long, Cinnamon Seed (1934) and Sun in Capricorn (1942). Perry (2004) says Basso was a slashingly witty critic of the moonlight and magnolia romanticism of the Old South that dominated the Southern mind before 1920. Like many proponents of a New South, he wanted modernizers to take over. Cinnamon Seed's Harry Brand incorporates more details from the historical Long than any other fictional portrayal does, and much of the novel is so lightly fictionalized that only a single letter separates the names of characters and places from their real-life counterparts. For example, Basso uses "Tillson" instead of "Wilson", "Janders" rather than "Sanders", and "Gwinn Parish" for "Winn Parish".

Brand is a representative of the grasping and vulgar kind of new leadership which has rightly understood that the values of the Old South are played out but has replaced them with nothing but ambition and cunning. He is a greedy climber, not a demonic leader of the masses, and in fact he is ultimately not much more than an obnoxious and sticky-fingered lout, the kind who spits tobacco juice on the marble floors of his predecessors and pockets the ashtrays. In portraying his Long figure this way, Basso finds himself between the stools, critical of the spent aristocrats who cannot imagine a modern South, but disgusted also by the figures who represent the wrong kind of newness, the kind of modern South that comes to be if its development is left to default.

Sax Rohmer's 1936 novel President Fu Manchu features Long as "Harvey Bragg", his Share Our Wealth Society as the "League of Good Americans", and his supporter Father Coughlin as "Abbot Donegal". Bruce Sterling's Distraction features a colorful and dictatorial Louisiana governor named "Green Huey". Harry Turtledove's American Empire trilogy drew parallels between Confederate President Jake Featherston's populist, dictatorial style of rule and Long's governorship of Louisiana. In this trilogy, Long was the Radical Liberal Governor of Louisiana and was assassinated on orders from Featherston when he refused to side with the ruling Freedom Party (though several years later than in reality).

In Barry N. Malzberg's short story "Kingfish", published in the Alternate Presidents anthology, Long survives his assassination, to be elected president in 1936 with the help of John Nance Garner, and both men conspire to assassinate Hitler prior to the start of World War II. In Donald Jeffries' 2007 novel The Unreals, there is a scene featuring an imaginary meeting where FDR and other important Depression era figures are plotting the assassination of Senator Long.

In general, the novelists have portrayed Long's rise to power as a justifiable popular reaction against the selfish policies pursued by the dominant economic interests prior to 1928. They speculate the degree to which his extremism reflected an overreaction to his enemies, or sprang inevitably from class conflict in the state. They all try to explain why Long enjoyed majority support in Louisiana, both during and after his lifetime.

In the thriller "An Exchange of Eagles" by Owen Sela, conspirators in 1940 make a cynical use of a diehard fan of Huey Long, training him to become an assassin and setting him to kill President Roosevelt - in revenge for Roosevelt's supposed complicity in the assassination of Long.

Max Allan Collins's 1995 novel Blood and Thunder, the seventh entry in his series featuring hard-boiled private eye Nate Heller, depicts the detective as being hired as a bodyguard for Long, then, failing to prevent his assassination, investigating that crime to see if there was more to it than met the eye.

== Theatre, music and television ==
Long's cultural influence is also felt in drama. In Tennessee Williams' play A Streetcar Named Desire (1947), Stanley Kowalski cites Hugh Long while claiming, "I'm the King around here" inside his New Orleans apartment. Two made-for-TV docudramas about Long have been produced: The Life and Assassination of the Kingfish (1977), starring Ed Asner, and Kingfish: A Story of Huey P. Long (1995), starring John Goodman. Long was the subject of a 1985 Ken Burns-directed documentary. In music, singer-songwriter Randy Newman featured Long in two songs on the 1974 album Good Old Boys.

Long's name was the inspiration for the Disney cartoon character "Huey" of the duck triplets Huey, Dewey, and Louie.

== Academia ==
Long has been the subject of dozens of biographies and academic texts. In fact, more has been written about Long than any other Louisianan. Most notably, the 1970 biography Huey Long by T. Harry Williams won both the Pulitzer Prize and the National Book Award in category History and Biography. Alan Brinkley won the latter award in 1983 for Voices of Protest: Huey Long, Father Coughlin and the Great Depression.
