= Texas Cotton Acreage Control Law of 1931–32 =

Texas 1931–32 agricultural regulation law

42nd Texas Legislature
- Territorial extent: Texas
- Passed: September 22, 1931
- Effective: September 22, 1931
- Repealed: January 19, 1932

Summary
- Reduced allowed land to produce cotton.

Keywords
- Agricultural policy
- Status: Blocked

The Texas Cotton Acreage Control Law of 1931–32 was an agricultural law of the Texas Legislature, that reduced the space for cotton farming to 30% of Texas' total cultivation acreage.

== Background ==
Cotton was a strong export prior to the American Civil War, but because of the economic weakening of the export and cotton's degradation on soil quality, it had become unsustainable by the 1920s. During The Southern Cotton Conference, on August 4, 1931, in Austin, Texas, delegates from five states argued southern cotton needed its production lowered by legal means to grow more economically sustainable crops.

== History ==
On September 22, 1931, the Texas Legislature passed the bill during a special session called by governor Ross S. Sterling. The law reduced cotton's space for production to 30% of Texas' total farmland acreage, and that beginning after 1933, cotton could not be planted in succeeding years. It carried a punishment of a $25–$100 fine per acre violating, and was imposed by the state and county governments. It went into effect on September 22, due to the suspension of Texas' rule of three readings.

The law met mixed opinions about its ability to keep cotton cheap, including from state senator Walter Hartwell Beck and journalist Peter Molyneaux, as well as some positive opinions, including from educator Edwin Jackson Kyle and Louisiana governor Huey Long, the latter later proposing similar policies, known as the Cotton-Holiday. The law also displaced Mexican farmers.

Due to the onset of the Great Depression, the law gained more negative attention; the need for more cotton sales was evident with South Texas farmers cutting their cotton and William L. Clayton bringing more against the law. On January 19, 1932, a Franklin, Texas court case between T. L. Tyson and farmer Fred L. Smith led to a judge declaring the law unconstitutional on a state and federal level, a ruling which stood in the Texas Courts of Appeals on March 5.
