= Every Man a King (song) =

Song cowritten by Huey Long

"Every Man a King" is a song cowritten by Louisiana's Governor and United States Senator Huey Long and Castro Carazo. Long was known for his political slogan "Every man a king", which is also the title of his 1933 autobiography and the catch-phrase of his Share Our Wealth proposal during the Great Depression. The song's lyrics include the lines "With castles and clothing and food for all / All belongs to you". The song was co-written in 1935 by Huey Long and Castro Carazo, the band director of Louisiana State University, a former orchestra leader at the Roosevelt Hotel in New Orleans brought to LSU by Long himself.

== Origin ==
The phrase "Every man a king, but no one wears a crown" was adopted from Democratic presidential candidate William Jennings Bryan. Long also used the phrase as a political slogan and as the name of his autobiography.

== Lyrics ==
Why weep or slumber America?
Land of brave and true
With castles, and clothing, and food for all
All belongs to you
Every man a king! Every man a king!
For you can be a millionaire
But there's something belonging to others
There's enough for all people to share
When it's sunny June and December too
Or in the wintertime or spring
There'll be peace without end!
Every neighbor a friend
With every man a king!

== Recordings ==
The song was recorded by the Louisiana Boys in January 1935 (Bluebird B-5840) and again by the Louisiana Ramblers in October 1935, just a few weeks after Long's death (Decca 5151).

Singer-songwriter Randy Newman recorded the song on his 1974 album Good Old Boys.
