= Cotton-Holiday =

Agrigulture policy proposal by Huey Long

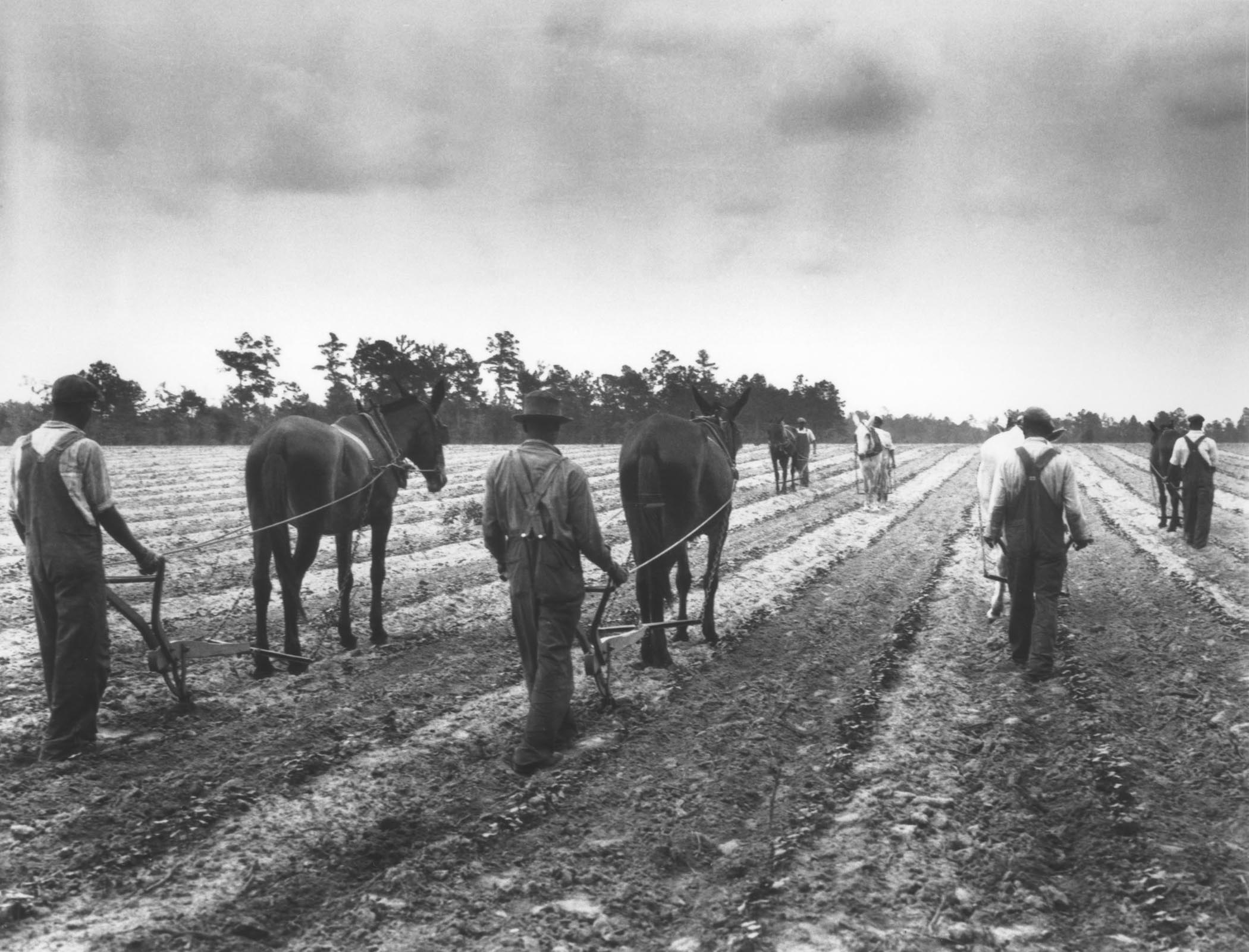
A South Carolina cotton field in 1932

The Cotton-Holiday was a 1931 proposal by Louisiana Governor and US Senator-elect Huey Long to alleviate a surplus of cotton. The holiday would have banned cotton production in 1932, decreasing supply and raising prices. It has been credited as the first suggestion of artificial scarcity as a solution to the Great Depression.

== Background ==
A record 1931 cotton crop of over 15.5 million bales, over two million higher than projected, resulted in a plunge in prices of agricultural commodities. At its lowest since 1905, the price of cotton was less than the cost of production. In a telegram to the governors of fourteen cotton-producing states, the Federal Farm Board (FFB) chairman recommended that farmers be forced to plow over every third row of cotton, destroying some 4 million bales of the 1931 crop. The advice was widely criticized.

Unlike other industries, cotton had not experienced massive prosperity in the 1920s, worsening the impact of the Great Depression.

== Proposal ==
Long proposed that the states mandate a "cotton holiday" in 1932, in which not a single bale of cotton would be produced. Long wired his proposal to the other governors and invited them to discuss the proposal at the New Orleans Cotton Conference. To protect domestic prices, Long further proposed that the holiday be imposed internationally, in which some nations, such as Egypt, expressed interest. The 1931 convention was attended by delegates from every major cotton-producing state. After defeating a countering Texas plan of only 50% reduction, the delegates agreed to codify Long's proposal into law on the caveat that they not come into effect until states producing three-quarters of US cotton passed such laws.

As the proposer, Louisiana unanimously passed the legislation. Conservative Texan governor Ross S. Sterling, whose state was the largest producer of cotton, condemned the law as radical. When the Texas legislature voted against the measure, the holiday movement collapsed. Long alleged that "Texas legislators were bought to kill the cotton-holiday plan like you'd buy a slot machine."

Texas instead passed the Texas Cotton Acreage Control Law of 1931–32, which stated that no more than 30% of cultivated land could be used for cotton. Difficult to enforce, the law was found unconstitutional in 1932. Mississippi and Arkansas passed similar legislation except with escape clauses which set dates for the regulations to expire.

== Legacy ==
Although traditional politicians would have been ruined by such a defeat, Long became a national figure and cemented his image as a champion of the poor.

Senator Carter Glass of Virginia, one of Long's most adamant opponents, said regarding the Cotton-Holiday, "Contrary... to popular supposition, neither Secretary Wallace of the Agriculture Department, nor the President of the United States should be credited with the original idea of 'scarcity of production' as a cure for the depression. The credit for this peculiar notion should go to Mr. Huey P. Long."
