= Voices of Protest =

1982 history of contemporary criticism of FDR's New Deal

Voices of Protest: Huey Long, Father Coughlin and the Great Depression
- Author: Alan Brinkley
- Language: English
- Publication date: 1982
- Publication place: United States
- Media type: Print
- Pages: 384
- ISBN: 978-0394716282

Voices of Protest: Huey Long, Father Coughlin and the Great Depression is a 1982 history by Alan Brinkley of contemporary left-wing criticism of US President Franklin D. Roosevelt's New Deal Programs, focusing primarily on Huey Long and Father Charles Coughlin.

It won the National Book Award for History in 1983.
