= Huey Long =

American politician (1893–1935)

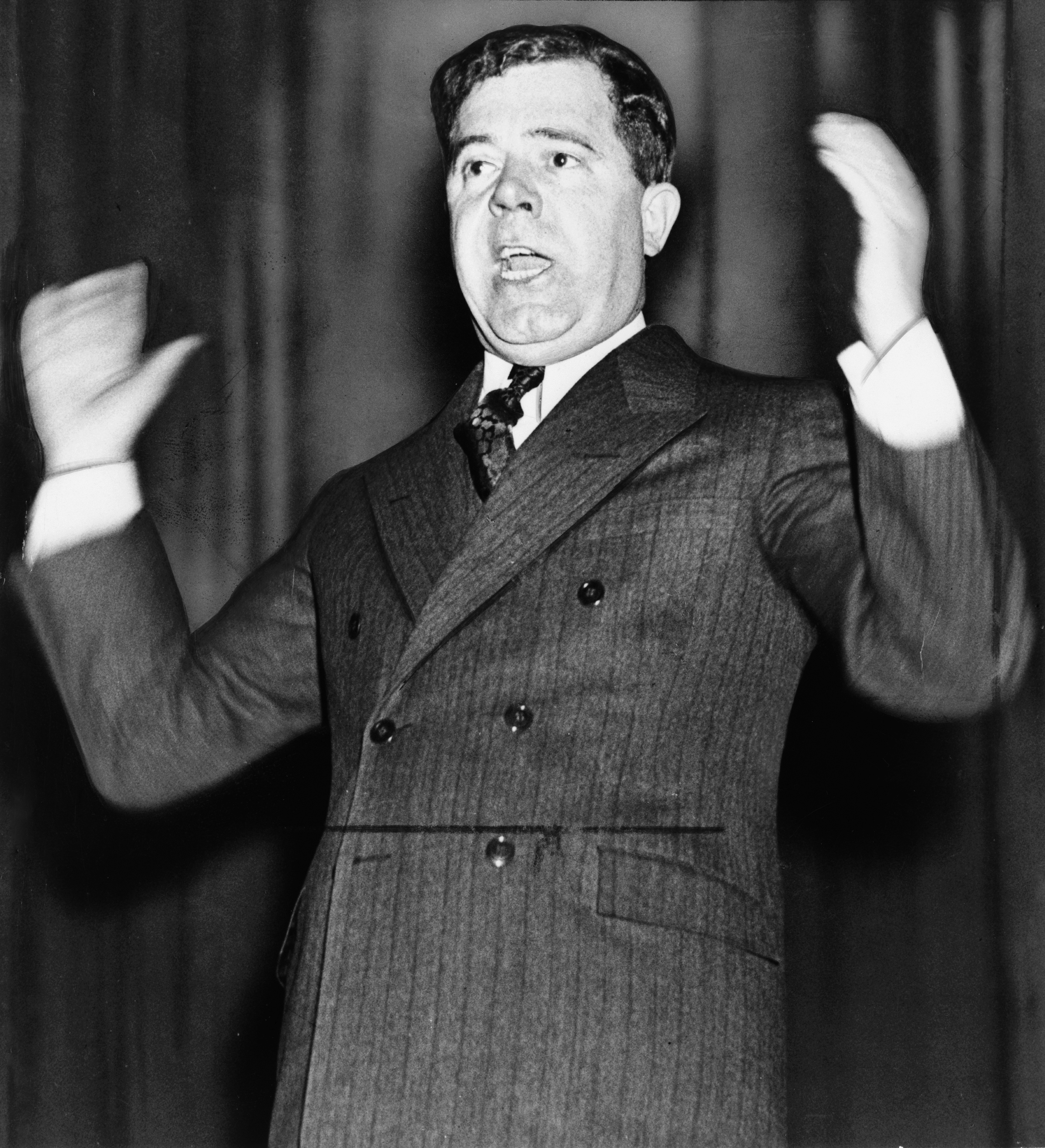
- Long in 1935

United States Senator from Louisiana
- In office January 25, 1932 – September 10, 1935
- Preceded by: Joseph E. Ransdell
- Succeeded by: Rose McConnell Long

40th Governor of Louisiana
- In office May 21, 1928 – January 25, 1932
- Lieutenant: Paul N. Cyr; Alvin Olin King
- Preceded by: Oramel H. Simpson
- Succeeded by: Alvin Olin King

Personal details
- Born: August 30, 1893 Winnfield, Louisiana, U.S.
- Died: September 10, 1935 (aged 42) Baton Rouge, Louisiana, U.S.
- Cause of death: Assassination (gunshot wound)
- Resting place: Louisiana State Capitol
- Party: Democratic
- Spouse: Rose McConnell (m. 1913)
- Children: 3; including Russell
- Relatives: Long family
- Profession: Politician, lawyer

Huey Pierce Long Jr. (August 30, 1893 – September 10, 1935), nicknamed "the Kingfish", was an American politician who served as the 40th governor of Louisiana from 1928 to 1932 and as a United States senator from 1932 until his assassination in 1935. He was a left-wing populist member of the Democratic Party and rose to national prominence during the Great Depression for his vocal criticism of President Franklin D. Roosevelt and his New Deal, which Long deemed insufficiently radical. As the political leader of Louisiana, he commanded wide networks of supporters and often took forceful action. A controversial figure, Long is celebrated as a populist champion of the poor or, in contrast, denounced as a fascistic demagogue.

Long was born in the impoverished north of Louisiana in 1893. After working as a traveling salesman and briefly attending three colleges, he was admitted to the bar in Louisiana. Following a short career as an attorney, in which he often represented poor plaintiffs, Long was elected to the Louisiana Public Service Commission. As commissioner, he prosecuted large corporations such as Standard Oil, a lifelong target of his rhetorical attacks.

After a failed 1924 campaign, Long appealed to the sharp economic and class divisions in Louisiana to win the 1928 gubernatorial election. Once in office, he expanded social programs, organized massive public works projects, such as a modern highway system and the tallest capitol building in the nation, and proposed a cotton holiday. Through political maneuvering, Long became the political boss of Louisiana. He was impeached in 1929 for abuses of power, but the proceedings collapsed in the State Senate. His opponents argued his policies and methods were unconstitutional and authoritarian. At its climax, Long's political opposition organized a minor insurrection in 1935.

Long was elected to the U.S. Senate in 1930 but did not assume his seat until 1932. He established himself as an isolationist, arguing that Standard Oil and Wall Street orchestrated American foreign policy. He was instrumental in securing Franklin Roosevelt's 1932 presidential nomination, but split with him in 1933, becoming a prominent critic of his New Deal. As an alternative, he proposed the Share Our Wealth plan in 1934. To stimulate the economy, he advocated massive federal spending, a wealth tax, and wealth redistribution. These proposals drew widespread support, with millions joining local Share Our Wealth clubs. Poised for a 1936 presidential bid, Long was assassinated by Carl Weiss inside the Louisiana State Capitol in 1935. His assassin was immediately shot and killed by Long's bodyguards. Although Long's movement faded, Roosevelt adopted many of his proposals in the Second New Deal, and Louisiana politics would be organized along anti- or pro-Long factions until the 1960s. He left behind a political dynasty that included his wife, Senator Rose McConnell Long; his son, Senator Russell B. Long; and his brother, Governor Earl Long, among others.

== Early life (1893–1915) ==
=== Childhood ===
Huey Pierce Long Jr. was born on August 30, 1893, near Winnfield, a small town in north-central Louisiana, the seat of Winn Parish. Although Long often told followers he was born in a log cabin to an impoverished family, they lived in a "comfortable" farmhouse and were well-off compared to others in Winnfield. Winn Parish was impoverished, and its residents, mostly Southern Baptists, were often outsiders in Louisiana's political system. During the Civil War, Winn Parish had been a stronghold of Unionism in an otherwise Confederate state. At Louisiana's 1861 convention on secession, the delegate from Winn voted to remain in the Union saying: "Who wants to fight to keep the Negroes for the wealthy planters?" (Note: Long's grandfather did not fight in the Civil War, instilling Union sympathies in his son, Huey P. Long Sr. Also a populist, Long's father said in an interview at the age of 83, "There wants to be a revolution, I tell you. I seen the domination of capital, seen it for seventy years. What do these rich folks care for the poor man? They care nothing—not for his pain, nor his sickness, nor his death ... Maybe you're surprised to hear talk like that. Well, it was just such talk that my boy was raised under, and that I was raised under.") In the 1890s, the parish was a bastion of the Populist Party, and in the 1912 election, Socialist presidential candidate Eugene V. Debs received 35% of the vote. Long embraced these populist sentiments.

One of nine children, Long was home-schooled until age eleven. In the public system, he earned a reputation as an excellent student with a remarkable memory and convinced his teachers to let him skip seventh grade. At Winnfield High School, he and his friends formed a secret society, advertising their exclusivity by wearing a red ribbon. According to Long, his club's mission was "to run things, laying down certain rules the students would have to follow". The faculty learned of Long's antics and warned him to obey the school's rules. Long continued to rebel, writing and distributing a flyer that criticized his teachers and the necessity of a recently state-mandated fourth year of secondary education, for which he was expelled in 1910. Although Long successfully petitioned to fire the principal, he never returned to high school. As a student, Long proved a capable debater. At a state debate competition in Baton Rouge, he won a full-tuition scholarship to Louisiana State University (LSU). Because the scholarship did not cover textbooks or living expenses, his family could not afford for him to attend. Long was also unable to attend because he did not graduate from high school. Instead, he entered the workforce as a traveling salesman in the rural South.

=== Education and marriage ===
In September 1911, Long started attending seminary classes at Oklahoma Baptist University at the urging of his mother, a devout Baptist. Living with his brother George, Long attended for only one semester, rarely appearing at lectures. After deciding he was unsuited to preaching, Long focused on law. Borrowing one hundred dollars from his brother (which he later lost playing roulette in Oklahoma City), he attended the University of Oklahoma College of Law for a semester in 1912. To earn money while studying law part-time, he continued to work as a salesman. Of the four classes Long took, he received one incomplete and three C's. He later confessed he learned little because there was "too much excitement, all those gambling houses and everything".

Long met Rose McConnell at a baking contest he had promoted to sell Cottolene shortening. The two began a two-and-a-half-year courtship and married in April 1913 at the Gayoso Hotel in Memphis, Tennessee. On their wedding day, Long had no cash with him and had to borrow $10 from his fiancée to pay the officiant. Shortly after their marriage, Long revealed to his wife his aspirations to run for a statewide office, the governorship, the Senate, and ultimately the presidency. The Longs had a daughter named Rose (1917–2006) and two sons: Russell B. Long (1918–2003), who became a U.S. senator, and Palmer Reid Long (1921–2010), who became an oilman in Shreveport, Louisiana.

Long enrolled at Tulane University Law School in New Orleans in the fall of 1914. After a year of study that concentrated on the courses necessary for the bar exam, he successfully petitioned the Louisiana Supreme Court for permission to take the test before its scheduled June 1915 date. He was examined in May, passed, and received his license to practice. According to Long: "I came out of that courtroom running for office."

== Legal career (1915–1923) ==
In 1915, Long established a private practice in Winnfield. He represented poor plaintiffs, usually in workers' compensation cases. Long avoided fighting in World War I by obtaining a draft deferment on the grounds that he was married and had a dependent child. He successfully defended from prosecution under the Espionage Act of 1917 the state senator who had loaned him the money to complete his legal studies, and later claimed he did not serve because, "I was not mad at anybody over there." In 1918, Long invested $1,050 (equivalent to $18,066 in 2020) in a well that struck oil. The Standard Oil Company refused to accept any of the oil in its pipelines, costing Long his investment. This episode served as the catalyst for Long's lifelong hatred of Standard Oil.

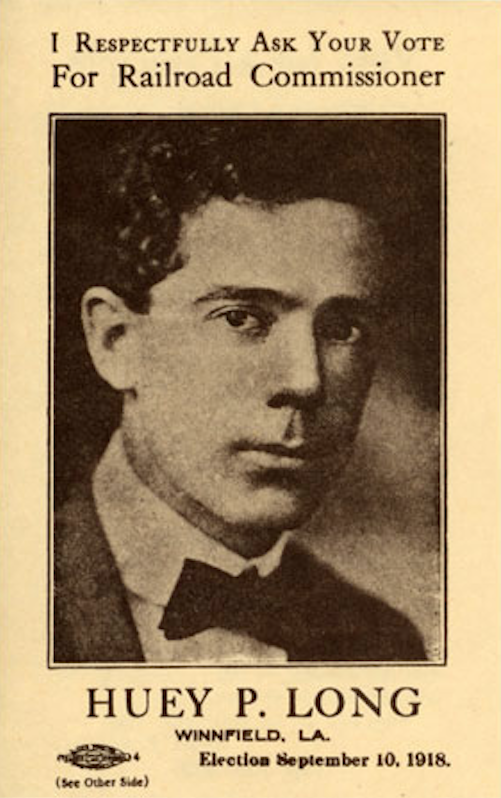
Card for Long's 1918 campaign for railroad commissioner

That same year, Long entered the race to serve on the three-seat Louisiana Railroad Commission. According to historian William Ivy Hair, Long's political message:

... would be repeated until the end of his days: he was a young warrior of and for the plain people, battling the evil giants of Wall Street and their corporations; too much of America's wealth was concentrated in too few hands, and this unfairness was perpetuated by an educational system so stacked against the poor that (according to his statistics) only fourteen out of every thousand children obtained a college education. The way to begin rectifying these wrongs was to turn out of office the corrupt local flunkies of big business ... and elect instead true men of the people, such as [himself].

In the Democratic primary, Long polled second behind incumbent Burk Bridges. Since no candidate garnered a majority of the votes, a run-off election was held, for which Long campaigned tirelessly across northern Louisiana. The race was close: Long defeated Burk by just 636 votes. Although the returns revealed wide support for Long in rural areas, he performed poorly in urban areas. On the Commission, Long forced utilities to lower rates, ordered railroads to extend service to small towns, and demanded that Standard Oil cease the importation of Mexican crude oil and use more oil from Louisiana wells.

In the gubernatorial election of 1920, Long campaigned heavily for John M. Parker; today, he is often credited with helping Parker win northern parishes. After Parker was elected, the two became bitter rivals. Their break was largely caused by Long's demand and Parker's refusal to declare the state's oil pipelines public utilities. Long was infuriated when Parker allowed oil companies, led by Standard Oil's legal team, to assist in writing severance tax laws. Long denounced Parker as corporate "chattel". The feud climaxed in 1921, when Parker tried unsuccessfully to have Long ousted from the commission.

By 1922, Long had become chairman of the commission, now called the "Public Service Commission". That year, Long prosecuted the Cumberland Telephone & Telegraph Company for unfair rate increases; he successfully argued the case on appeal before the United States Supreme Court, which resulted in cash refunds to thousands of overcharged customers.

== Gubernatorial campaigns (1924–1928) ==
=== 1924 election ===
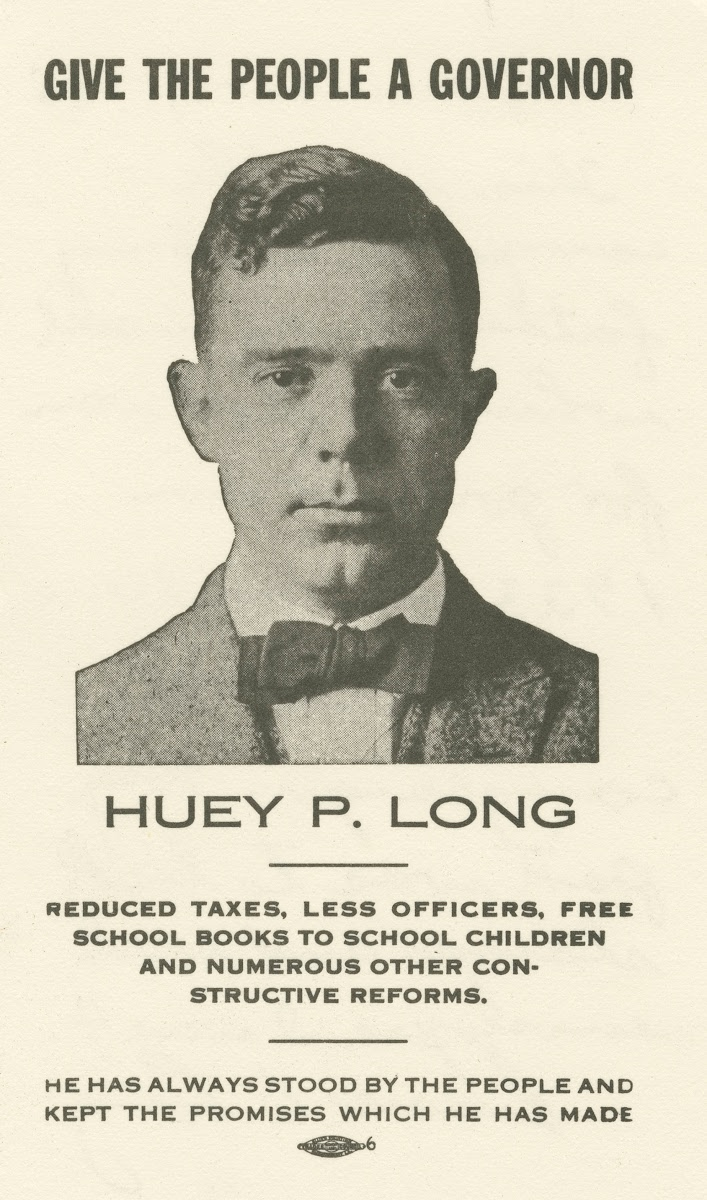
Card for Long's 1924 gubernatorial campaign

On August 30, 1923, Long announced his candidacy for the governorship of Louisiana. Long stumped throughout the state, personally distributing circulars and posters. He denounced Governor Parker as a corporate stooge, vilified Standard Oil, and assailed local political bosses.

He campaigned in rural areas disenfranchised by the state's political establishment, the "Old Regulars". Since the 1877 end of Republican-controlled Reconstruction government, they had controlled most of the state through alliances with local officials. With negligible support for Republicans, Louisiana was essentially a one party state under the Democratic Old Regulars. Holding mock elections in which they invoked the Lost Cause of the Confederacy, the Old Regulars presided over a corrupt government that largely benefited the planter class. Consequently, Louisiana was one of the least developed states: It had just 300 miles of paved roads and the lowest literacy rate.

Despite an enthusiastic campaign, Long came third in the primary and was eliminated. Although polls projected only a few thousand votes, he attracted almost 72,000, around 31% of the electorate, and carried 28 parishes—more than either opponent. Limited to sectional appeal, he performed best in the poor rural north.

The Ku Klux Klan's prominence in Louisiana was the campaign's primary issue. While the two other candidates either strongly opposed or supported the Klan, Long remained neutral, alienating both sides. He also failed to attract Catholic voters, which limited his chances in the south of the state. In majority Catholic New Orleans, he polled just 12,000 votes (17%). Long blamed heavy rain on election day for suppressing voter turnout among his base in the north, where voters could not reach the polls over dirt roads that had turned to mud. It was the only election Long ever lost.

=== 1928 election ===
And it is here, under this oak, where Evangeline waited in vain for her lover, Gabriel, who never came. This oak is an immortal spot, made so by Longfellow's poem, but Evangeline is not the only one who has waited here in disappointment. Where are the schools that you have waited for your children to have, that have never come? Where are the roads and the highways that you sent your money to build, that are no nearer now than ever before? Where are the institutions to care for the sick and disabled? Evangeline wept bitter tears in her disappointment, but it lasted only through one lifetime. Your tears in this country, around this oak, have lasted for generations. Give me the chance to dry the eyes of those who still weep here.

— An example of Long's 1928 campaign rhetoric

Long spent the intervening four years building his reputation and political organization, particularly in the heavily Catholic urban south. Despite disagreeing with their politics, Long campaigned for Catholic U.S. Senators in 1924 and 1926. Government mismanagement during the Great Mississippi Flood of 1927 gained Long the support of Cajuns, whose land had been affected. He formally launched his second campaign for governor in 1927, using the slogan, "Every man a king, but no one wears a crown", a phrase adopted from Democratic presidential candidate William Jennings Bryan.

Long developed novel campaign techniques, including the use of sound trucks and radio commercials. His stance on race was unorthodox. According to T. Harry Williams, Long was "the first Southern mass leader to leave aside race baiting and appeals to the Southern tradition and the Southern past and address himself to the social and economic problems of the present". (Note: The conclusion that Long was progressive on the issue of race, widely repeated in the decades after Long's death, has faced increased scrutiny in recent years.) The campaign sometimes descended into brutality. When the 60-year-old incumbent governor called Long a liar during a chance encounter in the lobby of the Roosevelt Hotel, Long punched him in the face.

In the Democratic primary election, Long polled 126,842 votes: a plurality of 43.9 percent. His margin was the largest in state history, and no opponent chose to face him in a runoff. After earning the Democratic nomination, he easily defeated the Republican nominee in the general election with 96.1 percent of the vote.

Some fifteen thousand Louisianians traveled to Baton Rouge for Long's inauguration. He set up large tents, free drinks, and jazz bands on the capitol grounds, evoking Andrew Jackson's 1829 inaugural festivities. His victory was seen as a public backlash against the urban establishment; journalist Hodding Carter described it as a "fantastic vengeance upon the Sodom and Gomorrah that was called New Orleans". While previous elections were normally divided culturally and religiously, Long highlighted the sharp economic divide in the state and built a new coalition based on class. Long's strength, said the contemporary novelist Sherwood Anderson, relied on "the terrible South ... the beaten, ignorant, Bible-ridden, white South. Faulkner occasionally really touches it. It has yet to be paid for."

== Louisiana governorship (1928–1932) ==
=== First year ===
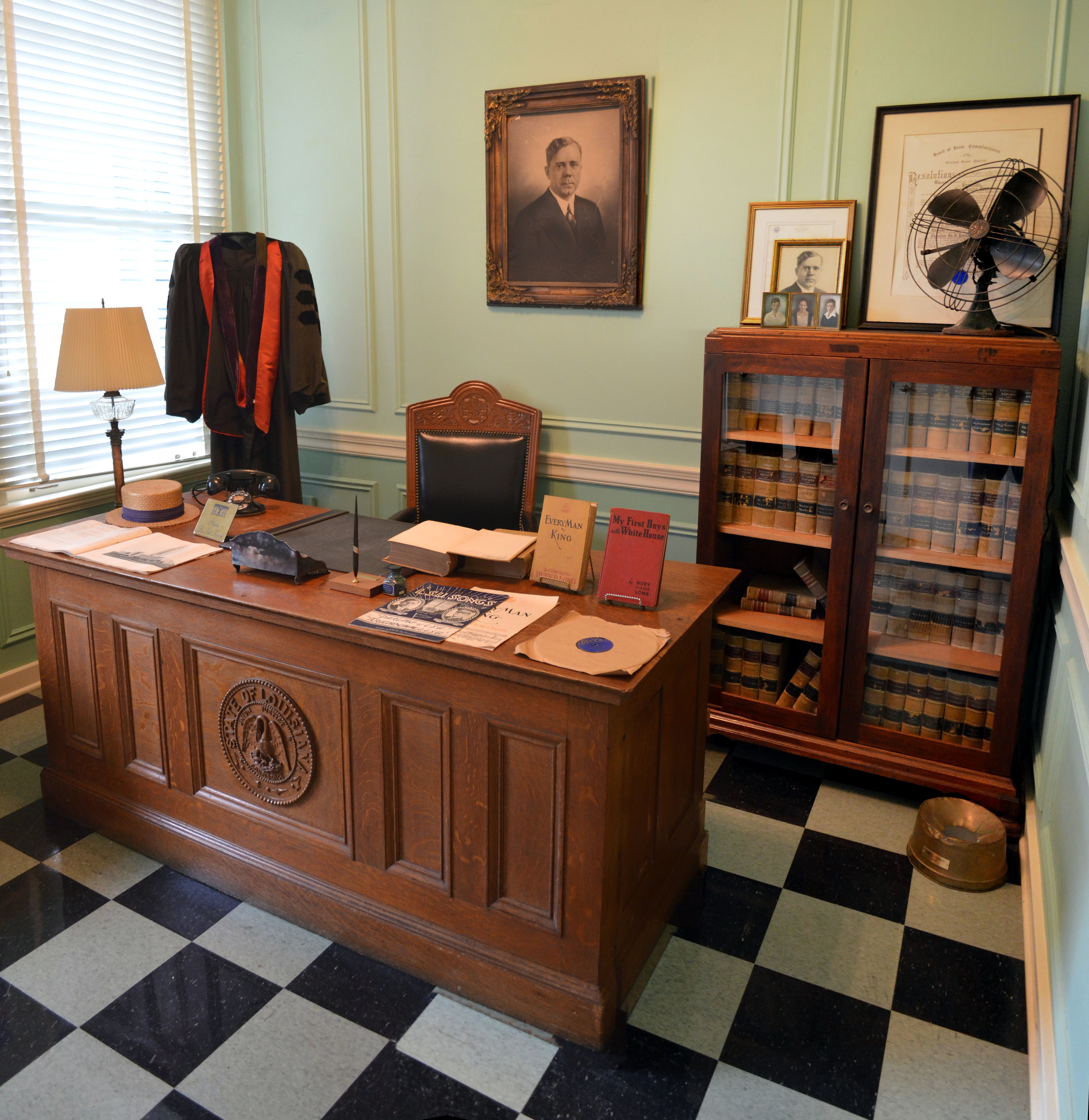
Long's office in the Governor's Mansion

Once in office on May 21, 1928, Long moved quickly to consolidate power, firing hundreds of opponents in the state bureaucracy at all ranks from cabinet-level heads of departments to state road workers. Like previous governors, he filled the vacancies with patronage appointments from his network of political supporters. Every state employee who depended on Long for a job was expected to pay a portion of their salary at election time directly into his campaign fund.

Once his control over the state's political apparatus was strengthened, Long pushed several bills through the 1929 session of the Louisiana State Legislature to fulfill campaign promises. His bills met opposition from legislators, wealthy citizens, and the media, but Long used aggressive tactics to ensure passage. He would appear unannounced on the floor of both the House and Senate or in House committees, corralling reluctant representatives and state senators and bullying opponents. When an opposing legislator once suggested Long was unfamiliar with the Louisiana Constitution, he declared, "I'm the Constitution around here now."

One program Long approved was a free textbook program for schoolchildren. Long's free school books angered Catholics, who usually sent their children to private schools. Long assured them that the books would be granted directly to all children, regardless of whether they attended public school. Yet this assurance was criticized by conservative constitutionalists, who claimed it violated the separation of church and state and sued Long. The case went to the U.S. Supreme Court, which ruled in Long's favor.

Irritated by "immoral" gambling dens and brothels in New Orleans, Long sent the National Guard to raid these establishments with orders to "shoot without hesitation". Gambling equipment was burned, prostitutes were arrested, and over $25,000 (equivalent to $376,793 in 2020) was confiscated for government funds. Local newspapers ran photos of National Guardsmen forcibly searching nude women. City authorities had not requested military force, and martial law had not been declared. The Louisiana attorney general denounced Long's actions as illegal but Long rebuked him, saying: "Nobody asked him for his opinion."

Despite wide disapproval, Long had the Governor's Mansion, built in 1887, razed by convicts from the State Penitentiary under his personal supervision. In its place, Long had a much larger Georgian mansion built. It bore a strong resemblance to the White House; he reportedly wanted to be familiar with the residence when he became president.

=== Impeachment ===
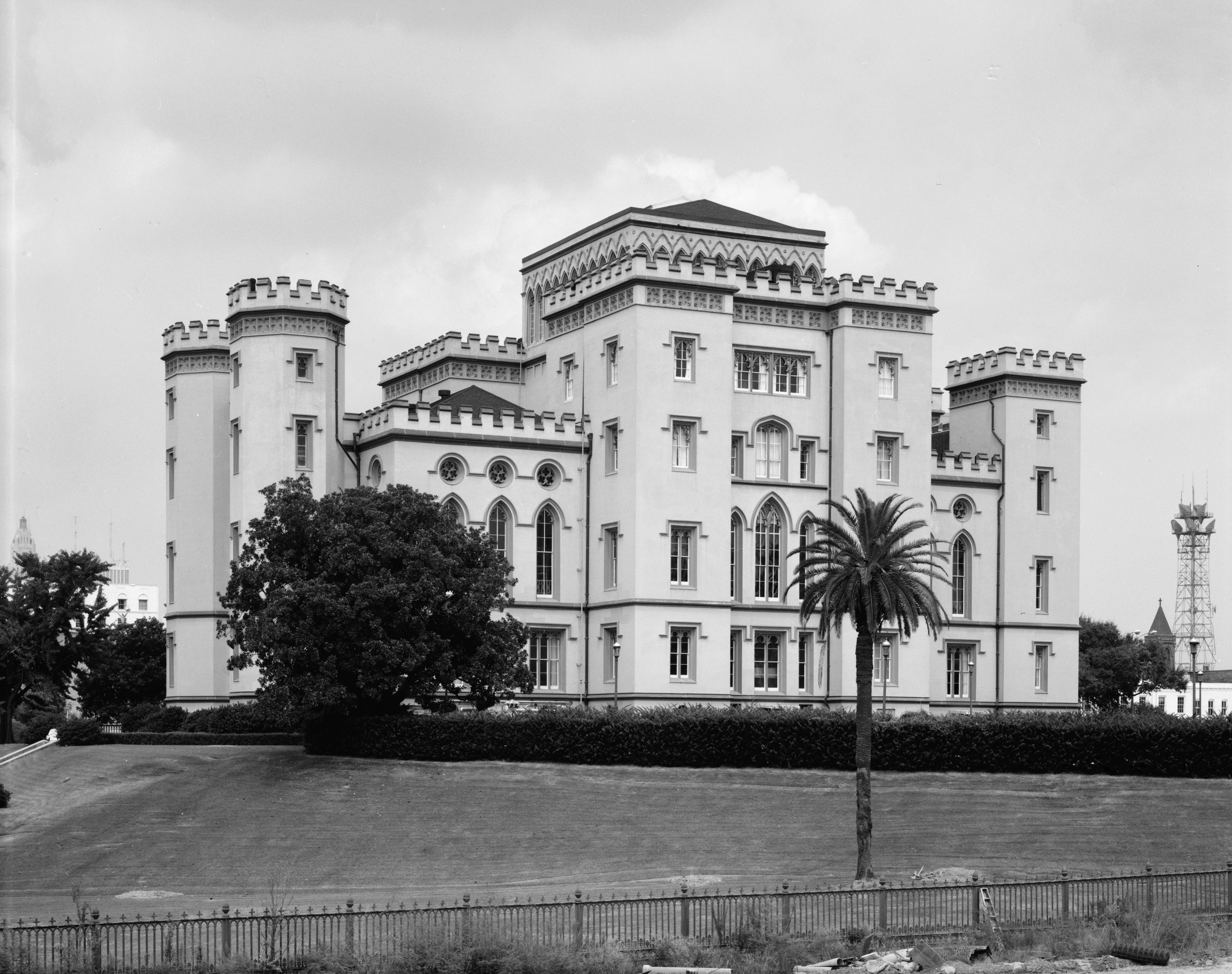
Long's impeachment was conducted at the Old Louisiana State Capitol.

In 1929, Long called a special legislative session to enact a five-cent per barrel tax on refined oil production to fund his social programs. The state's oil interests opposed the bill. Long declared in a radio address that any legislator who refused to support the tax had been "bought" by oil companies. Instead of persuading the legislature, the accusation infuriated many of its members. The "dynamite squad", a caucus of opponents led by freshman lawmakers Cecil Morgan and Ralph Norman Bauer, introduced an impeachment resolution against Long. Nineteen charges were listed, ranging from blasphemy to subornation of murder. (Note: One of Long's subordinates claimed in an affidavit that an intoxicated Long had told him to kill Representative J. Y. Sanders Jr., the son of a former governor, and "leave him in the ditch where nobody will know how or when he got there". Long allegedly promised him "a full pardon and many gold dollars".) Even Long's lieutenant governor, Paul Cyr, supported impeachment; he accused Long of nepotism and alleged he had made corrupt deals with a Texas oil company. (Note: Cyr's public turn against Long was largely motivated by Cyr's opposition to the executions of alleged murderers Thomas Dreher and Ada LeBoeuf, the first white woman executed in Louisiana's history. Cyr was a personal friend of Dreher and sat on the Board of Pardons, which had reversed their death sentence. Long wholeheartedly supported their execution, ultimately overruling the Board's decision.)

Concerned, Long tried to close the session. Pro-Long Speaker John B. Fournet called for a vote to adjourn. Despite most representatives opposing adjournment, the electronic voting board tallied 68 ayes and 13 nays. This sparked confusion; anti-Long representatives began chanting that the voting machine had been rigged. (Note: Fournet later apologized for the confusion caused by the inaccurate tally but denied rigging the outcome. According to Hair, "there is no evidence that he did; electrical contrivances of that sort were primitive, and apparently the machine simply repeated the roll call vote of a few minutes earlier".) Some ran for the speaker's chair to call for a new vote but met resistance from their pro-Long colleagues, sparking a brawl later known as "Bloody Monday". In the scuffle, legislators threw inkwells, allegedly attacked others with brass knuckles, and Long's brother Earl bit a legislator's neck. Following the fight, the legislature voted to remain in session and proceed with impeachment. Proceedings in the house took place with dozens of witnesses, including a hula dancer who claimed that Long had been "frisky" with her. Impeached on eight of the 19 charges, (Note: The charges were: attempted bribery of state legislators, demanding and receiving undated letters of resignation from appointees, intimidating publisher Charles P. Manship by threatening to disclose his brother's poor mental condition, misappropriating portions of a $6,000 fund allocated for receiving other governors, forcing a state board to dismiss its secretary to open up a position for a political ally and paying the incumbent secretary $5,400 in hush money, illegally paying his cousin W. O. Long $728.25 from the governor's office expense fund, using $1,112.40 from the office expense fund to purchase personal law books, forcing the Highway Commission to accede to a contractor's demand for $4,000 in payment for their installation of defective curbs, and incompetency.) Long was the third Louisiana governor charged in the state's history, following Reconstruction Republicans Henry Clay Warmoth and William Pitt Kellogg.

Long was frightened by the prospect of conviction, for it would force him from the governorship and permanently disqualify him from holding public office in Louisiana. He took his case to the people with a mass meeting in Baton Rouge, where he alleged that impeachment was a ploy by Standard Oil to thwart his programs. The House referred the charges to the Louisiana Senate, in which conviction required a two-thirds majority. Long produced a round robin statement signed by fifteen senators pledging to vote "not guilty" regardless of the evidence. The impeachment process, now futile, was suspended without holding an impeachment trial. It has been alleged that both sides used bribes to buy votes and that Long later rewarded the round robin signers with positions or other favors.

Following the failed impeachment attempt, Long treated his opponents ruthlessly. He fired their relatives from state jobs and supported their challengers in elections. Long concluded that extra-legal means would be needed to accomplish his goals: "I used to try to get things done by saying 'please.' Now ... I dynamite 'em out of my path." Receiving death threats, he surrounded himself with bodyguards. Now a resolute critic of the "lying" press, Long established his own newspaper in March 1930: the Louisiana Progress. The paper was extremely popular, widely distributed by policemen, highway workers, and government truckers.

=== Senate campaign ===
Shortly after the impeachment, Long—now nicknamed "The Kingfish" after an Amos 'n' Andy character—announced his candidacy for the U.S. Senate in the 1930 Democratic primary. He framed his campaign as a referendum. If he won, he presumed the public supported his programs over the opposition of the legislature. If he lost, he promised to resign.

His opponent was incumbent Joseph E. Ransdell, the Catholic senator whom Long endorsed in 1924. At 72 years old, Ransdell had served in the U.S. Congress since Long was aged six. Aligned with the establishment, Ransdell had the support of all 18 of the state's daily newspapers. To combat this, Long purchased two new $30,000 sound trucks and distributed over two million circulars. Although promising not to make personal attacks, Long seized on Ransdell's age, calling him "Old Feather Duster". The campaign became increasingly vicious, with The New York Times calling it "as amusing as it was depressing". Long critic Sam Irby, (Note: Irby was the uncle of Alice Lee Grosjean, Long's young personal secretary, whom he had appointed to the position of Secretary of State. She was rumored to be his mistress.) set to testify on Long's corruption to state authorities, was abducted by Long's bodyguards shortly before the election. Irby emerged after the election; he had been missing for four days. Surrounded by Long's guards, he gave a radio address in which he "confessed" that he had actually asked Long for protection. The New Orleans mayor labelled it "the most heinous public crime in Louisiana history".

Ultimately, on September 9, 1930, Long defeated Ransdell by 149,640 (57.3 percent) to 111,451 (42.7 percent). There were accusations of voter fraud against Long; voting records showed people voting in alphabetical order, among them celebrities like Charlie Chaplin, Jack Dempsey and Babe Ruth. Although his Senate term began on March 4, 1931, Long completed most of his four-year term as governor, which did not end until May 1932. He declared that leaving the seat vacant would not hurt Louisiana: "[W]ith Ransdell as Senator, the seat was vacant anyway." By occupying the governorship until January 25, 1932, Long prevented Lieutenant Governor Cyr, who threatened to undo Long's reforms, from succeeding to the office. In October 1931, Cyr learned Long was in Mississippi and declared himself the state's legitimate governor. In response, Long ordered National Guard troops to surround the Capitol to block Cyr's "coup d'état" and petitioned the Louisiana Supreme Court. Long successfully argued that Cyr had vacated the office of lieutenant-governor when trying to assume the governorship and had the court eject Cyr.

=== Senator-elect ===
Now governor and senator-elect, Long returned to completing his legislative agenda with renewed strength. He continued his intimidating practice of presiding over the legislature, (Note: Long would stand directly below the Speaker's podium while strong-arming the legislators into passing his agenda.) shouting "Shut up!" or "Sit down!" when legislators voiced their concerns. In a single night, Long passed 44 bills in just two hours: one every three minutes. He later explained his tactics: "The end justifies the means." Long endorsed pro-Long candidates and wooed others with favors; he often joked his legislature was the "finest collection of lawmakers money can buy". He organized and concentrated his power into a political machine: "a one-man" operation, according to Williams. He placed his brother Earl in charge of allotting patronage appointments to local politicians and signing state contracts with businessmen in exchange for loyalty. Long appointed allies to key government positions, such as giving Robert Maestri the office of Conservation Commissioner and making Oscar K. Allen head of the Louisiana Highway Commission. Maestri would deliberately neglect the regulation of energy companies in exchange for industry donations to Long's campaign fund, while Allen took direction from Earl on which construction and supply companies to contract for road work. Concerned by these tactics, Long's opponents charged he had become the virtual dictator of the state.

To address record low cotton prices amid a Great Depression surplus, Long proposed the major cotton-producing states mandate a 1932 "cotton holiday", which would ban cotton production for the entire year. He further proposed that the holiday be imposed internationally, which some nations, such as Egypt, supported. In 1931, Long convened the New Orleans Cotton Conference, attended by delegates from every major cotton-producing state. The delegates agreed to codify Long's proposal into law on the caveat that it would not come into effect until states producing three-quarters of U.S. cotton passed such laws. As the proposer, Louisiana unanimously passed the legislation. When conservative politicians in Texas—the largest cotton producer in the U.S.—rejected the measure, the holiday movement collapsed. Although traditional politicians would have been ruined by such a defeat, Long became a national figure and cemented his image as a champion of the poor. Senator Carter Glass, although a fervid critic of Long, credited him with first suggesting artificial scarcity as a solution to the depression.

=== Accomplishments ===
Long constructed a new capitol building, which, at 450 feet (140 m), remains the tallest capitol in the United States.

Long was unusual among southern populists in that he achieved tangible progress. Williams concluded "the secret of Long's power, in the final analysis, was not in his machine or his political dealings but in his record—he delivered something". Referencing Long's contributions to Louisiana, Robert Penn Warren, a professor at LSU during Long's term as governor, stated: "Dictators, always give something for what they get."

Long created a public works program that was unprecedented in the South, constructing roads, bridges, hospitals, schools, and state buildings. During his four years as governor, Long increased paved highways in Louisiana from 331 to 2,301 miles (533 to 3,703 km) and constructed 2,816 miles (4,532 km) of gravel roads. By 1936, the infrastructure program begun by Long had completed some 9,700 miles (15,600 km) of new roads, doubling Louisiana's road system. He built 111 bridges and started construction on the first bridge over the Mississippi entirely in Louisiana, the Huey P. Long Bridge. These projects provided thousands of jobs during the depression: Louisiana employed more highway workers than any other state. Long built a State Capitol, which at 450 feet (140 m) tall remains the tallest capitol, state or federal, in the United States. Long's infrastructure spending increased the state government's debt from $11 million in 1928 to $150 million in 1935.

Long was an ardent supporter of the state's flagship public university, Louisiana State University (LSU). Having been unable to attend, Long now regarded it as "his" university. He increased LSU's funding and intervened in the university's affairs, expelling seven students who criticized him in the school newspaper. He constructed new buildings, including a fieldhouse that reportedly contained the longest pool in the United States. Long founded an LSU Medical School in New Orleans. (Note: Although he claimed it was to educate poor doctors, it may have been based on a personal vendetta against Tulane University, which had declined to grant him an honorary degree.) To raise the stature of the football program, he converted the school's military marching band into the flashy "Show Band of the South" and hired Costa Rican composer Castro Carazo as the band director. As well as nearly doubling the size of the stadium, he arranged for lowered train fares, so students could travel to away games. Long's contributions resulted in LSU gaining a class A accreditation from the Association of American Universities.

Long's night schools taught 100,000 adults to read. His provision of free textbooks contributed to a 20-percent increase in school enrollment. He modernized public health facilities and ensured adequate conditions for the mentally ill. He established Louisiana's first rehabilitation program for penitentiary inmates. Through tax reform, Long made the first $2,000 in property assessment free, waiving property taxes for half the state's homeowners. Several labor laws were also enacted during Long's time as governor. Some historians have criticized other policies, like high consumer taxes on gasoline and cigarettes, a reduced mother's pension, and low teacher salaries.

== U.S. Senate (1932–1935) ==
=== Senator ===
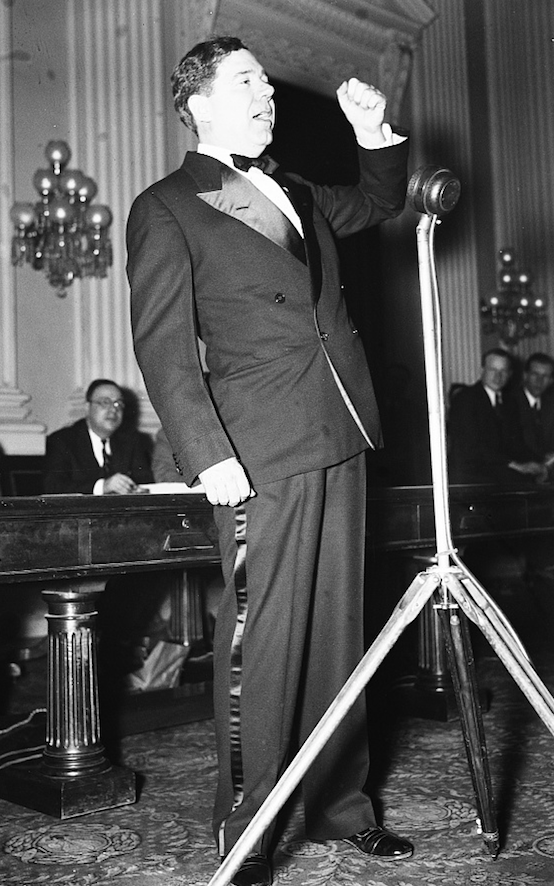
Long delivering a speech

When Long arrived in the Senate, America was in the throes of the Great Depression. With this backdrop, Long made characteristically fiery speeches that denounced wealth inequality. He criticized the leaders of both parties for failing to address the crisis adequately, notably attacking Senate Democratic Leader Joseph Robinson of Arkansas for his apparent closeness with President Herbert Hoover and big business.

In the 1932 presidential election, Long was a vocal supporter of New York Governor Franklin D. Roosevelt. At that year's Democratic National Convention, Long kept the delegations of several wavering Southern states in the Roosevelt camp. Due to this, Long expected to be featured prominently in Roosevelt's campaign but was disappointed with a peripheral speaking tour limited to four Midwestern states.

Not discouraged after being snubbed, Long found other venues for his populist message. He endorsed Senator Hattie Caraway of Arkansas, a widow and the underdog candidate in a crowded field and conducted a whirlwind, seven-day tour of that state. (Note: According to Brinkley, "Long's reasons for this decision were not entirely clear." Long noted that he felt a chivalric impulse to help this "brave little woman" and that Caraway was one of the few senators to vote for his wealth-limiting proposals. Long appreciated that she often voted against her senior colleague from Arkansas, Robinson. Many observers speculate that Long's true intent was to further establish a national reputation for himself. The New York Times contemporarily suggested that he was plotting to "yield him control of the [Senate] minority—or perhaps the majority". Brinkley claims that it was Long's first effort to propel himself to national leadership, which required him to appeal directly to the people rather than through political channels in Washington.) During the campaign, Long gave 39 speeches, traveled 2,100 miles (3,400 km), and spoke to over 200,000 people. In an upset win, Caraway became the first woman elected to a full term in the Senate.

Returning to Washington, Long gave theatrical speeches which drew wide attention. Public viewing areas were crowded with onlookers, among them a young Lyndon B. Johnson, who later said he was "simply entranced" by Long. Long obstructed bills for weeks, launching hour-long filibusters and having the clerk read superfluous documents. Long's antics, one editorial claimed, had made the Senate "impotent". In May 1932, The Washington Post called for his resignation. Long's behavior and radical rhetoric did little to endear him to his fellow senators. None of his proposed bills, resolutions, or motions were passed during his three years in the Senate.

=== Roosevelt and the New Deal ===
During the first 100 days of Roosevelt's presidency in spring 1933, Long's attitude toward Roosevelt and the New Deal was tepid. Aware that Roosevelt had no intention of radically redistributing the country's wealth, Long became one of the few national politicians to oppose Roosevelt's New Deal policies from the left. (Note: The other most notable critic was Catholic preacher and radio-host Father Coughlin.) He considered them inadequate in the face of the escalating economic crisis but still supported some of Roosevelt's programs in the Senate, explaining: "Whenever this administration has gone to the left I have voted with it, and whenever it has gone to the right I have voted against it."

Long opposed the National Recovery Act, claiming it favored industrialists. In an attempt to prevent its passage, Long held a lone filibuster, speaking for 15 hours and 30 minutes, the second longest filibuster at the time. He also criticized Social Security, calling it inadequate and expressing his concerns that states would administer it in a way discriminatory to African Americans. In 1933, he was a leader of a three-week Senate filibuster against the Glass banking bill, which he later supported as the Glass–Steagall Act after provisions extended government deposit insurance to state banks as well as national banks.

Roosevelt considered Long a radical demagogue and stated that Long, along with General Douglas MacArthur, "was one of the two most dangerous men in America". In June 1933, in an effort to undermine Long's political dominance, Roosevelt cut him out of consultations on the distribution of federal funds and patronage in Louisiana and placed Long's opponents in charge of federal programs in the state. Roosevelt supported a Senate inquiry into the election of Long ally John H. Overton to the Senate in 1932. The Long machine was accused of election fraud and voter intimidation, but the inquiry came up empty, and Overton was seated. To discredit Long and damage his support base, Roosevelt had Long's finances investigated by the Internal Revenue Service in 1934. (Note: The investigation into Long's finances was initiated in 1932 by Hoover but had been temporarily halted by the incoming Roosevelt to amend relations with Long.) Although they failed to link Long to any illegality, some of his lieutenants were charged with income tax evasion. Roosevelt's son, Elliott, would later note that in this instance, his father "may have been the originator of the concept of employing the IRS as a weapon of political retribution".

=== Chaco War and foreign policy ===
On May 30, 1934, Long took to the Senate floor to debate the abrogation of the Platt Amendment. But instead of debating the amendment, Long declared his support for Paraguay against Bolivia in the Chaco War. He maintained that U.S. President Rutherford B. Hayes had awarded the oil-rich Chaco region to Paraguay in 1878. He attested Standard Oil had corrupted the Bolivian government and organized the war and that Wall Street orchestrated American foreign policy in Latin America. For his speech, Long received praise in Paraguay: after capturing a Bolivian fort in July 1934, they renamed it Fort Long. Long's allegations were widely publicized in Latin American newspapers. This drew the concern of the State Department, who believed that Long was damaging the reputation of the United States. Throughout the summer of 1934, they waged a sustained public relations campaign against Long throughout Latin America. This speech and others established Long as one of the most ardent isolationists in the Senate. He further argued that American involvement in the Spanish–American War and the First World War had been deadly mistakes conducted on behalf of Wall Street. Consequently, Long demanded the immediate independence of the Philippines, which the United States had occupied since 1898. He also opposed American entry into the World Court.

=== Share Our Wealth ===
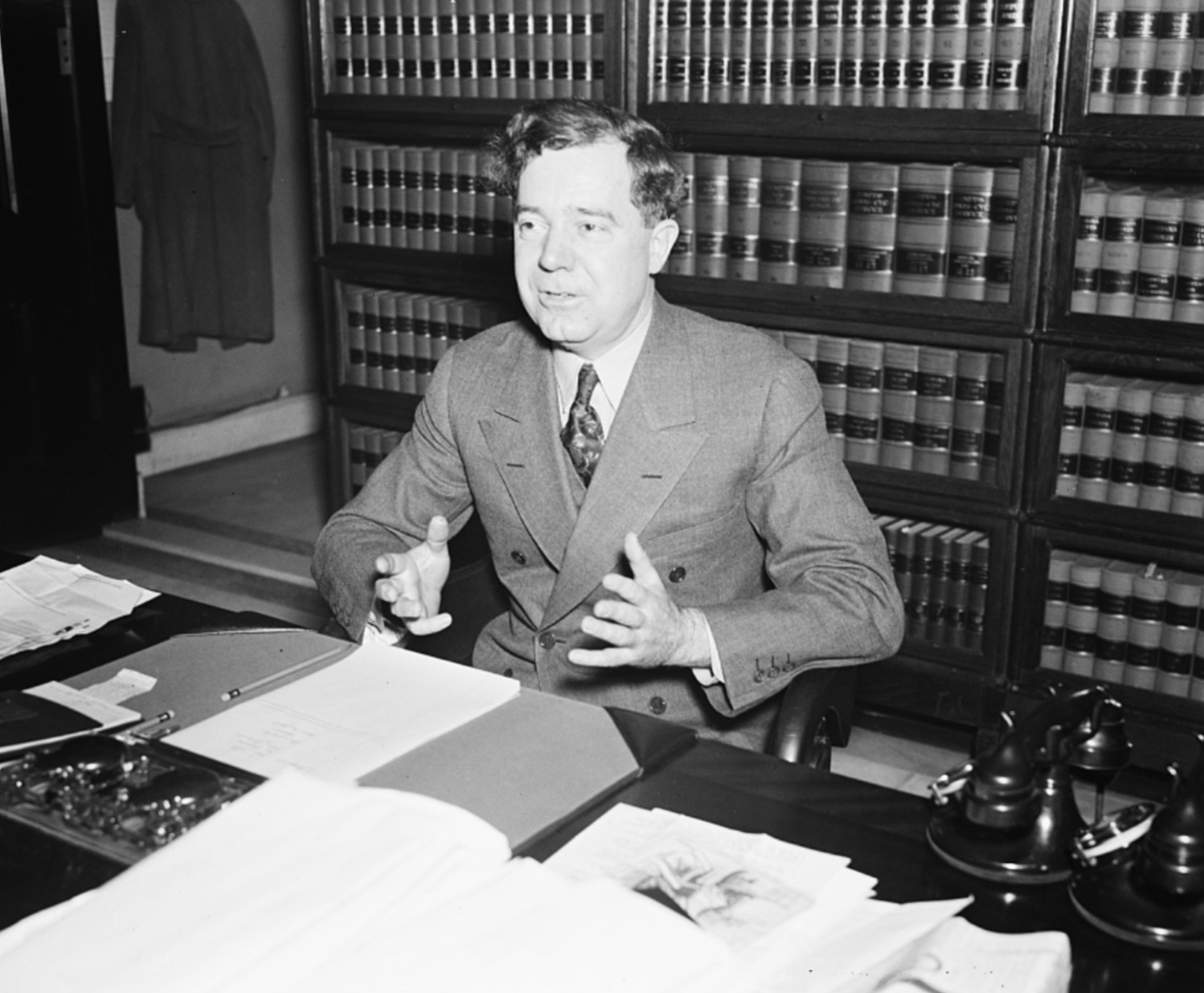
Long speaking from behind his desk at the Capitol, 1935

In March 1933, Long revealed a series of bills collectively known as "the Long plan" to redistribute wealth. Together, they would cap fortunes at $100 million, limit annual income to $1 million, and cap individual inheritances at $5 million.

External videos
- Long's "Share the Wealth" speech on YouTube

In a nationwide February 1934 radio broadcast, Long introduced his Share Our Wealth plan. The legislation would use the wealth from the Long plan to guarantee every family a basic household grant of $5,000 and a minimum annual income of one-third of the average family homestead value and income. Long supplemented his plan with proposals for free college and vocational training, veterans' benefits, federal assistance to farmers, public works projects, greater federal economic regulation, a $30 monthly elderly pension, a month's vacation for every worker, a thirty-hour workweek, a $10 billion land reclamation project to end the Dust Bowl, and free medical service and a "war on disease" led by the Mayo brothers. These reforms, Long claimed, would end the Great Depression. The plans were widely criticized and labeled impossible by economists.

With the Senate unwilling to support his proposals, in February 1934 Long formed the Share Our Wealth Society, a national network of local clubs that operated in opposition to the Democratic Party and Roosevelt. By 1935, the society had over 7.5 million members in 27,000 clubs. Long's Senate office received an average of 60,000 letters a week, resulting in Long's hiring 48 stenographers to type responses. Of the two trucks that delivered mail to the Senate, one was devoted solely to mail for Long. Long's newspaper, now renamed American Progress, averaged a circulation of 300,000, some issues reaching over 1.5 million. Long drew international attention: English writer H. G. Wells interviewed Long, noting he was "like a Winston Churchill who has never been at Harrow. He abounds in promises."

Some historians believe that pressure from Share Our Wealth contributed to Roosevelt's "turn to the left" in the Second New Deal (1935), which consisted of the Social Security Act, the Works Progress Administration, the National Labor Relations Board, Aid to Dependent Children, and the Wealth Tax Act of 1935. Roosevelt reportedly admitted in private to trying to "steal Long's thunder".

=== Continued control over Louisiana ===
Long continued to maintain effective control of Louisiana while he was a senator, blurring the boundary between federal and state politics. Long chose his childhood friend, Oscar K. Allen, to succeed King in the January 1932 election. With the support of Long's voter base, Allen won easily, permitting Long to resign as governor and take his seat in the U.S. Senate in January 1932. Allen, widely viewed as a puppet, dutifully enacted Long's policies. When Long visited Louisiana, Allen would relinquish his office for the Senator, working instead at his receptionist's desk. Though he had no constitutional authority, Long continued to draft and press bills through the Louisiana State Legislature. One of the laws passed was what Long called "a tax on lying"—a 2 percent tax on newspaper advertising revenue.

In 1934, Long and James A. Noe, an independent oilman and member of the Louisiana State Senate from Ouachita Parish, formed the controversial Win or Lose Oil Company. The firm was established to obtain leases on state-owned lands so that its directors might collect bonuses and sublease the mineral rights to the major oil companies. Although ruled legal, these activities were done in secret, and the stockholders were unknown to the public. Long made a profit on the bonuses and the resale of those state leases and used the funds primarily for political purposes.

== Death ==
=== 1936 presidential ambitions ===
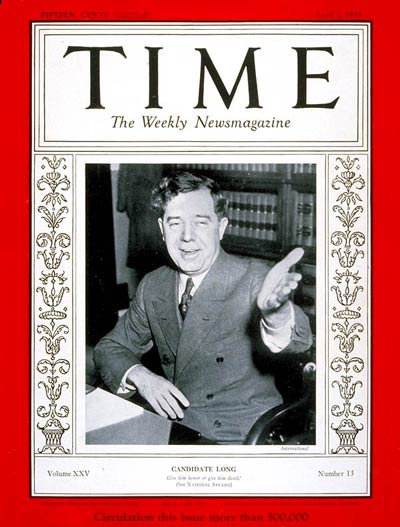
"Candidate Long" on the cover of Time magazine, April 1935

Popular support for Long's Share Our Wealth program raised the possibility of a 1936 presidential bid against incumbent Franklin D. Roosevelt. (Note: There was contemporary speculation that a Long campaign would collaborate with Father Coughlin and his National Union for Social Justice. Despite some common political goals, the two men were of vastly different backgrounds and personalities, expressed contempt for one another, and had only met once.) When questioned by the press, Long gave conflicting answers on his plans for 1936. Long's son Russell believed his father would have run on a third-party ticket. This is evidenced by Long's writing of a speculative book, My First Days in the White House, which laid out his plans for the presidency after the 1936 election. (Note: The book was published posthumously in 1935.)

In spring 1935, Long undertook a national speaking tour and regular radio appearances, attracting large crowds and increasing his stature. At a well-attended Long rally in Philadelphia, a former mayor told the press, "There are 250,000 Long votes" in this city. Regarding Roosevelt, Long boasted to the New York Times' Arthur Krock: "He's scared of me. I can out-promise him, and he knows it."

As the 1936 election approached, the Roosevelt Administration grew increasingly concerned by Long's popularity. Democratic National Committee chairman James Farley commissioned a secret poll in early 1935. Farley's poll revealed that if Long ran on a third-party ticket, he would win about four million votes, 10% of the electorate. In a memo to Roosevelt, Farley expressed his concern that Long could split the vote, allowing the Republican nominee to win. Diplomat Edward M. House warned Roosevelt, "many people believe that he can do to your administration what Theodore Roosevelt did to the Taft Administration in '12". Many, including Hair, Roosevelt, and Williams speculated that Long expected to lose in 1936, allowing the Republicans to take the White House. They believed the Republicans would worsen the Great Depression, deepening Long's appeal. According to Roosevelt, "That would bring the country to such a state by 1940 that Long thinks he would be made dictator."

=== Increased tensions in Louisiana ===
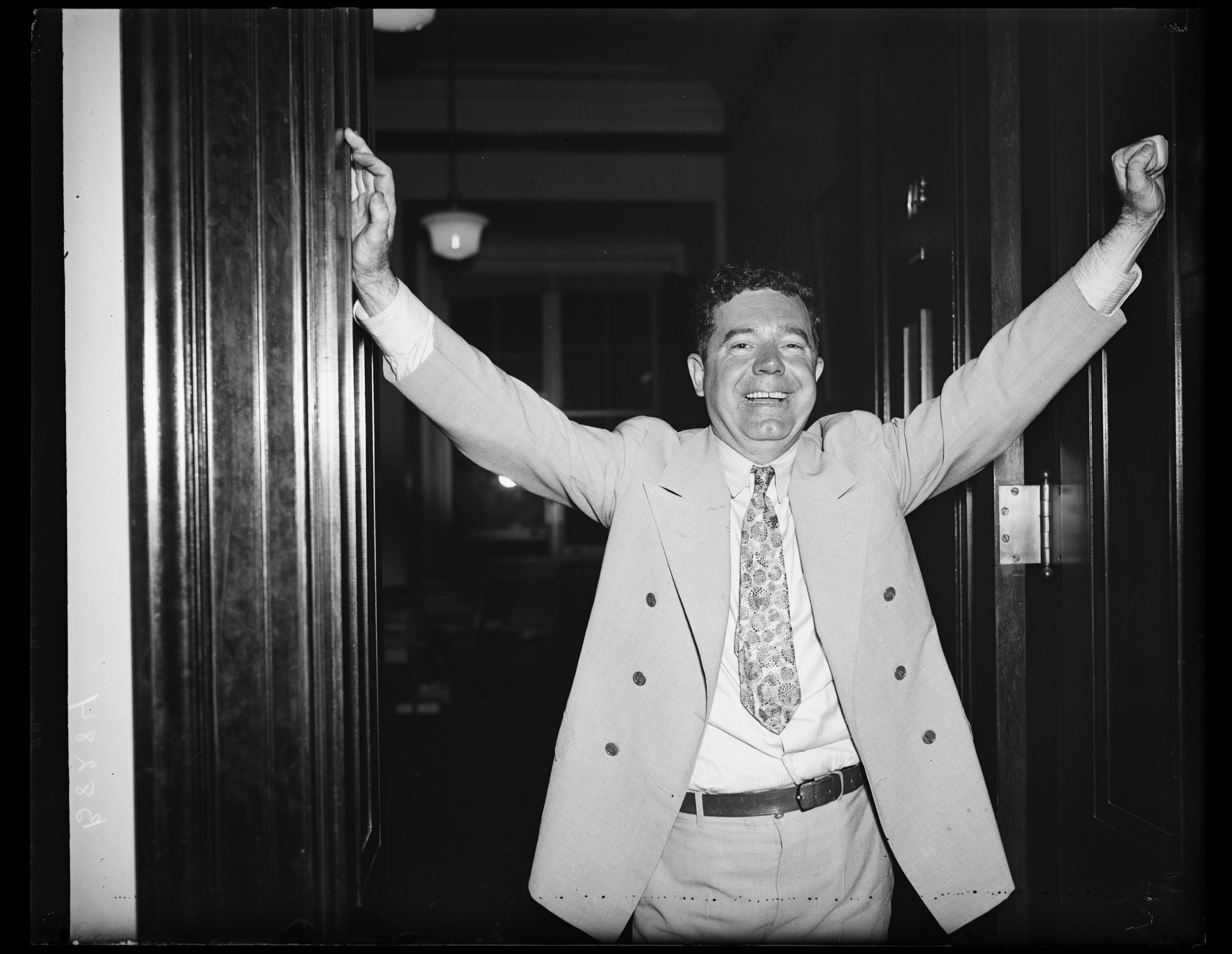
Long after giving a successful five-hour filibuster, about two weeks before his death

Following his electoral defeat in the 1934 New Orleans mayoral election, in which Long's bitter adversary T. Semmes Walmsley was reelected as mayor, Huey Long declared a 'limited martial law' and seized the Office of the Registrar of Voters on July 30, 1934. Citing the rampant corruption in the city of New Orleans and the need to secure election integrity ahead of the September primary elections, and claiming that Walmsley was closely linked to the city's crime and that city officials were going to illegally purge voters, Long deployed an estimated 2,500 militiamen force in New Orleans while the city garnered a force of about 500 special police officers in response.

By 1935, Long's consolidation of power led to talk of armed opposition from his enemies in Louisiana. Opponents increasingly invoked the memory of the Battle of Liberty Place (1874), in which the White League staged an uprising against Louisiana's Reconstruction-era government. In January 1935, an anti-Long paramilitary organization called the Square Deal Association was formed. Its members included former governors John M. Parker and Ruffin Pleasant and New Orleans Mayor T. Semmes Walmsley. Standard Oil threatened to leave the state when Long finally passed the five-cent-per-barrel oil tax for which he had been impeached in 1929. Concerned Standard Oil employees formed a Square Deal association in Baton Rouge, organizing themselves in militia companies and demanding "direct action".

On January 25, 1935, these Square Dealers, now armed, seized the East Baton Rouge Parish courthouse. Long had Governor Allen execute emergency measures in Baton Rouge: he called in the National Guard, declared martial law, banned public gatherings of two or more persons, and forbade the publication of criticism of state officials. The Square Dealers left the courthouse, but there was a brief armed skirmish at the Baton Rouge Airport. Tear gas and live ammunition were fired; one person was wounded, but there were no fatalities. At a legal hearing, an alleged spy within the Square Dealers testified they were conspiring to assassinate Long.

In summer 1935, Long called two special legislative sessions in Louisiana; bills were passed in rapid-fire succession without being read or discussed. The new laws further centralized Long's control over the state by creating new Long-appointed state agencies: a state bond and tax board holding sole authority to approve loans to local governments, a new state printing board which could withhold "official printer" status from uncooperative newspapers, a new board of election supervisors which would appoint all poll watchers, and a State Board of Censors. They stripped away the remaining powers of the mayor of New Orleans. Long boasted he had "taken over every board and commission in New Orleans except the Community Chest and the Red Cross". A September 7 special session passed 42 bills. The most extreme, likely aimed at Roosevelt and his federal agents, authorized Louisiana to fine and imprison anyone who infringed on the powers reserved to the state in the Tenth Amendment to the United States Constitution.

=== Assassination ===
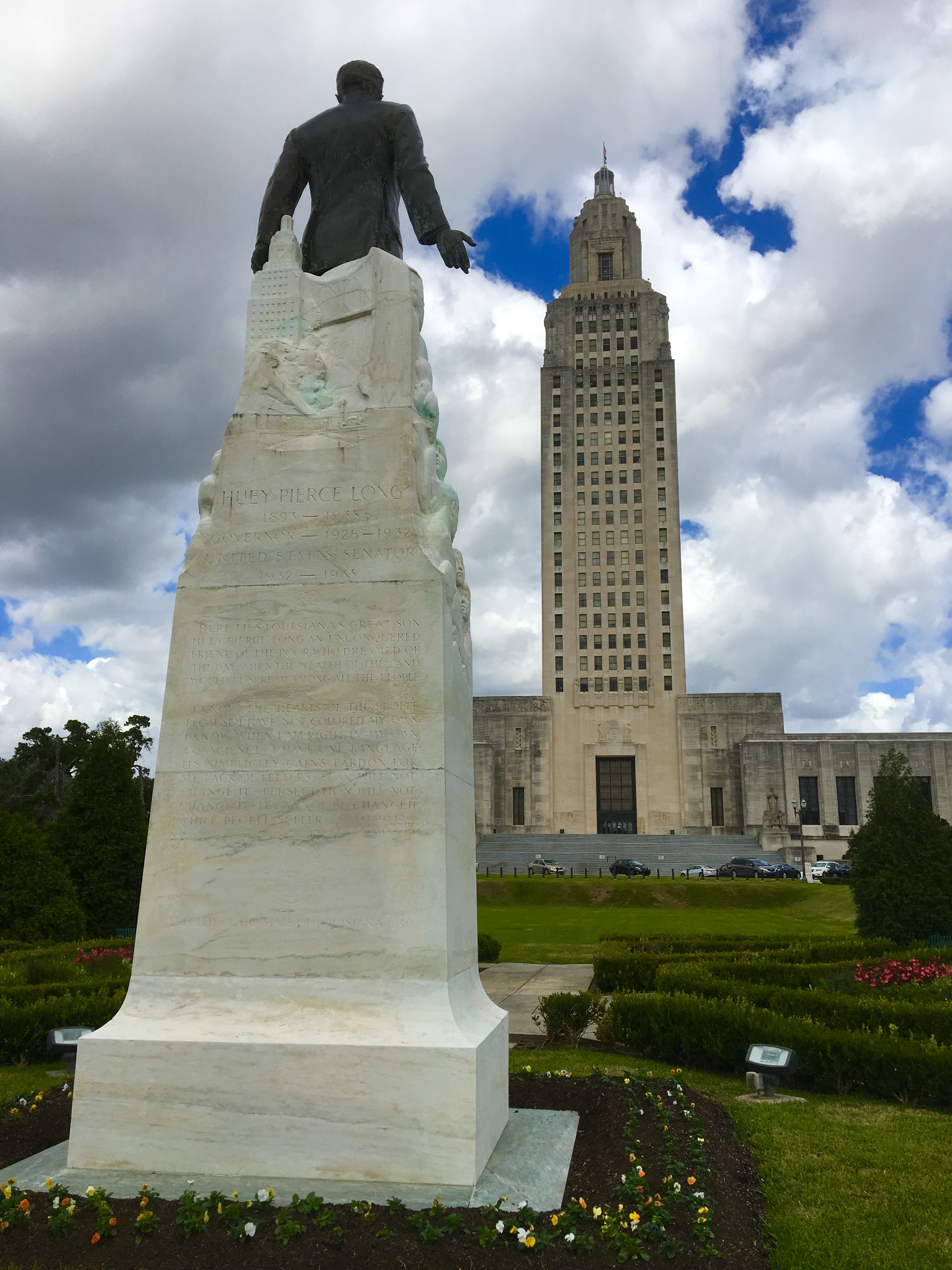
Long's grave and statue in front of the capitol

On Sunday, September 8, 1935, Long traveled to the State Capitol to pass a bill that would gerrymander the district of an opponent, Judge Benjamin Pavy, who had held his position for 28 years. At 9:20 p.m., just after passage of the bill effectively removing Pavy, the judge's son-in-law, Carl Weiss, approached Long, and, according to the generally accepted version of events, fired a single shot with a handgun from four feet (1.2 m) away, striking Long in the torso. Long's bodyguards, nicknamed the "Cossacks" or "skullcrushers", then fired at Weiss with their pistols, killing him. An autopsy found Weiss had been shot at least 60 times. Long ran down a flight of stairs and across the capitol grounds, hailing a car to take him to Our Lady of the Lake Hospital. He was rushed to the operating room where surgery closed perforations in his intestines but failed to stop internal bleeding. Long died at 4:10 a.m. on Tuesday, September 10, 31 hours after being shot. According to different sources, his last words were either "I wonder what will happen to my poor university boys" or "God, don't let me die. I have so much to do."

Over 200,000 people traveled to Baton Rouge to attend Long's September 12 funeral. His remains were buried on the grounds of the Capitol; a statue depicting Long was constructed on his grave. Although Long's allies alleged he was assassinated by political opponents, a federal probe found no evidence of conspiracy. Long's death brought relief to the Roosevelt Administration, which would win in a landslide in the 1936 election. Farley publicly admitted his apprehension of campaigning against Long: "I always laughed Huey off, but I did not feel that way about him." Roosevelt's close economic advisor Rexford Tugwell wrote that, "When he was gone it seemed that a beneficent peace had fallen on the land. Father Coughlin, Reno, Townsend, et al., were after all pygmies compared with Huey. He had been a major phenomenon." Tugwell also said that Roosevelt regarded Long's assassination as a "providential occurrence".

Evidence later surfaced that suggests Long was accidentally shot by his bodyguards. Proponents of this theory assert Long was caught in the crossfire as his bodyguards shot Weiss, and a bullet that ricocheted off the marble walls hit him.

== Legacy ==
=== Politics ===
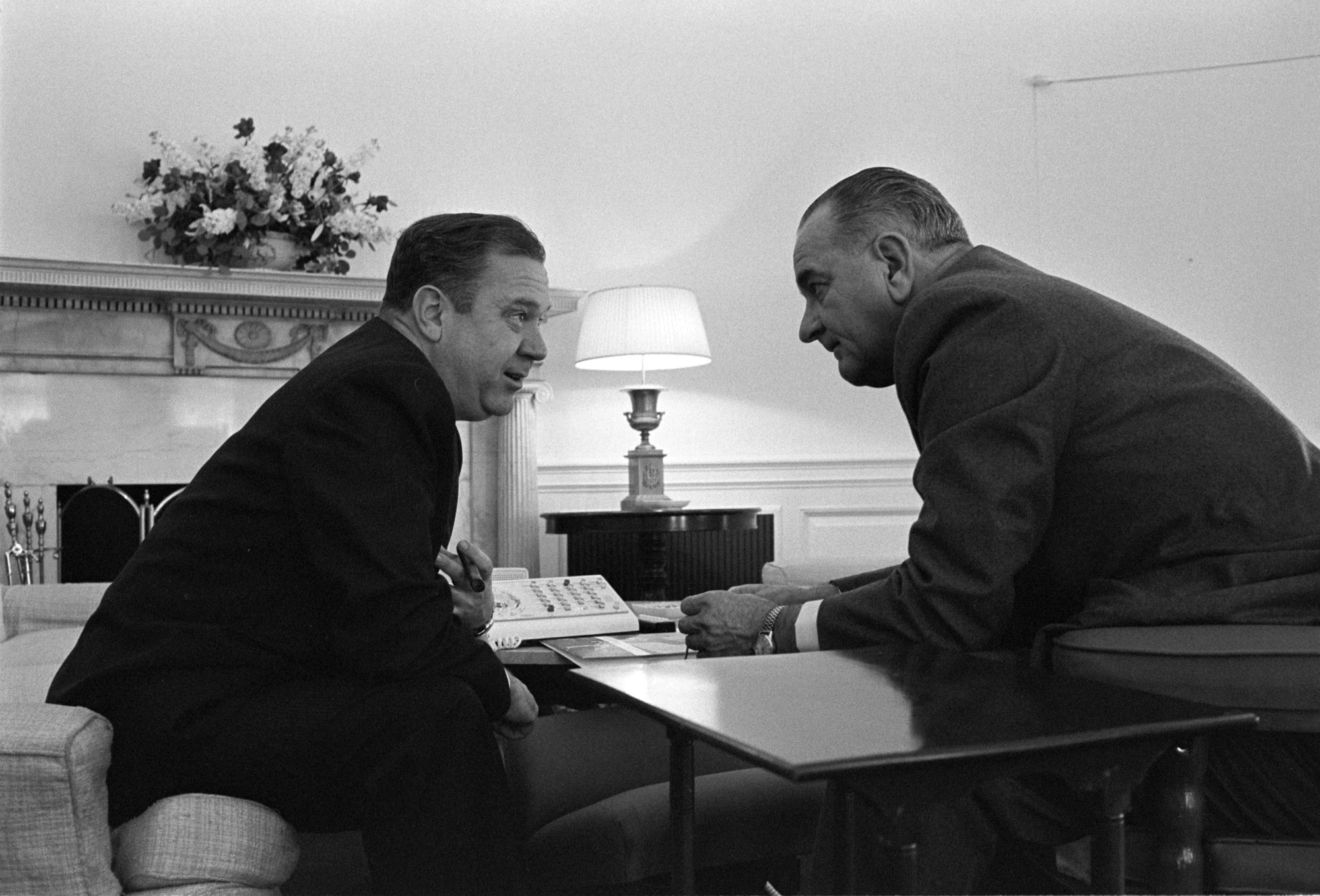
Long's son Russell (left), pictured with President Lyndon B. Johnson in 1964

Long's assassination may have contributed to his reputation as a legendary figure in parts of Louisiana. In 1938, Swedish sociologist Gunnar Myrdal encountered rural children who not only insisted Long was alive, but that he was president. Although no longer governing, Long's policies continued to be enacted in Louisiana by his political machine, which supported Roosevelt's re-election to prevent further investigation into their finances. The machine remained a powerful force in state politics until the 1960 elections. Within the Louisiana Democratic Party, Long set in motion two durable factions—"pro-Long" and "anti-Long"—which diverged meaningfully in terms of policies and voter support. For decades after his death, Long's political style inspired imitation among Louisiana politicians who borrowed his rhetoric and promises of social programs.

After Long's death, a family dynasty emerged: his brother Earl was elected lieutenant-governor in 1936 and governor in 1948 and 1956. Long's widow, Rose Long, replaced him in the Senate, and his son, Russell, was a U.S. senator from 1948 to 1987. As chairman of the Senate Finance Committee, Russell shaped the nation's tax laws, advocating low business taxes and passing legislation beneficial to the poor like the Earned Income Credit. Other relatives, including George, Gillis, and Speedy, have represented Louisiana in Congress.

Huey P. Newton, co-founder of the Black Panther Party, was named after Long.

=== Historical reputation ===
Academics and historians have found difficulty categorizing Long and his ideology. His platform has been compared to ideologies ranging from McCarthyism to European Fascism and Stalinism. When asked about his own philosophy, Long simply replied: "Oh, hell, say that I'm sui generis and let it go at that." In a 1981 New York Times article, Robert Penn Warren wrote of Long:

My guess is that he was a remarkable set of contradictions, still baffling to biographers. But I had a great interest in what Huey did in his world, and a greater interest in Huey as a focus of myth. Without this gift for attracting myth he would not have been the power he was, for good and evil. And this gift was fused, indissolubly, with his dramatic sense, with his varying roles and perhaps, ultimately, with the atmosphere of violence which he generated.

A majority of academics, biographers, and writers who have examined Long view him negatively, typically as a demagogue or dictator. (Note: In 1946, Russell—yet to be a senator—convinced Senator Overton to submit a motion titled "In Defense of My Father". Beginning with the sentence, "I venture the assertion that no man of our times has been more abused, vilified, and misrepresented by the American press to its reading public than my father, Huey P Long.", the motion was passed without objection and published in Congressional Review.) Reinhard H. Luthin said that he was the epitome of an American demagogue. David Kennedy wrote that Long's regime in Louisiana was "the closest thing to a dictatorship that America has ever known". Journalist Hodding Carter described him as "the first true dictator out of the soil of America" and his movement the "success of fascism in one American state". Peter Viereck categorized Long's movement as "chauvinist thought control"; Victor Ferkiss called it "incipient fascism".

One of the few biographers to praise Long was T. Harry Williams, who classified Long's ideas as neo-populist. He labeled Long a democratic "mass leader", rather than a demagogue. Besides Williams, intellectual Gore Vidal expressed admiration for Long, even naming him as his favorite contemporary U.S. politician. Long biographer Thomas O. Harris espoused a more nuanced view of Long: "neither saint nor devil, he was a complex and heterogenous mixture of good and bad, genius and craft, hypocrisy and candor, buffoonery and seriousness".

=== Media ===
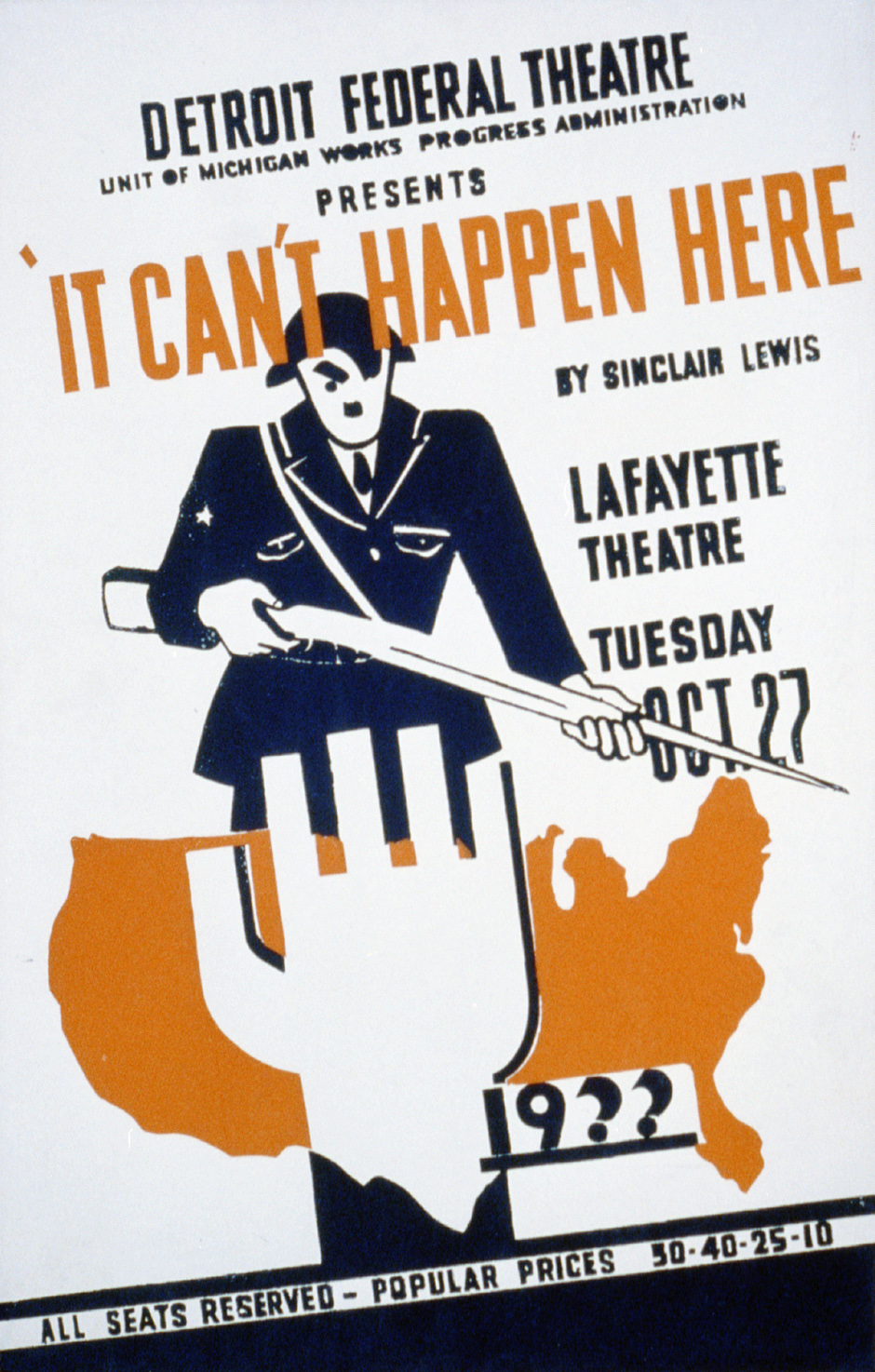
1936 poster for the WPA stage adaptation of It Can't Happen Here, whose dictatorial protagonist bears strong resemblances to Long

In popular culture, Long has served as a template for multiple dictatorial politicians in novels. Notable works include Sinclair Lewis's novel It Can't Happen Here (1935), Robert Penn Warren's Pulitzer Prize-winning novel All the King's Men (1946), and Adria Locke Langley's 1945 novel A Lion Is in the Streets. The latter two were adapted into films. As well as two television docudramas, Long was the subject of a 1985 Ken Burns-directed documentary. In music, Randy Newman featured Long in two songs on the 1974 album Good Old Boys.

Long has been the subject of dozens of biographies and academic texts. In fact, more has been written about Long than any other Louisianan. Most notable is the 1969 biography Huey Long by Williams, which won both the Pulitzer Prize and the National Book Award. Alan Brinkley won the National Book Award in 1983 for Voices of Protest, a study of Long, Coughlin, and populist opposition to Roosevelt.

== Works ==
=== Written works ===
- Constitutions of the State of Louisiana, 1930
- Every Man a King, 1933
- My First Days in the White House, 1935

=== Recorded works ===
Long collaborated with composer Castro Carazo on the following songs:

- "Darling of LSU", 1935
- "Every Man a King", 1935
- "The LSU Cadets March", 1935
- "Touchdown for LSU", 1935

== See also ==
- List of members of the United States Congress killed or wounded in office
- Charles Coughlin
- Francis Townsend

== Notes and references ==
=== Works cited ===
- Abadie, Dale (Summer 1970). "A Song of Huey Long". The Journal of Louisiana Historical Association. 11 (3): 271–73. JSTOR 4231135. (subscription required)
- Bergal, Jenni (2007). City Adrift: New Orleans Before and After Katrina. Baton Rouge, Louisiana: Louisiana State University Press. ISBN 978-0-8071-3386-6.
- Amenta, Edwin; Dunleavy, Kathleen; Bernstein, Mary (October 1994). "Stolen Thunder? Huey Long's 'Share Our Wealth,' Political Mediation, and the Second New Deal". American Sociological Review. 59 (5): 678–702. doi:10.2307/2096443. JSTOR 2096443. (subscription required)
- Berlet, Chip; Lyons, Matthew N. (2000). Right-Wing Populism in America: Too Close for Comfort. New York: Guilford Press. ISBN 978-1-4625-2838-7.
- Boulard, Garry (1998). Huey Long Invades New Orleans: the Siege of a City, 1934–36. New Orleans: Pelican Publishing Company. ISBN 978-1-4556-0609-2.
- Brands, H.W. (2008). Traitor to His Class: The Privileged Life and Radical Presidency of Franklin Delano Roosevelt. New York: Doubleday. ISBN 978-0-385-51958-8.
- Brinkley, Alan (1981). "Huey Long, the Share Our Wealth Movement, and the Limits of Depression Dissidence". Louisiana History: The Journal of the Louisiana Historical Association. 22 (2): 117–34. JSTOR 4232073. (subscription required)
- ——— (1983) [1982]. Voices of Protest: Huey Long, Father Coughlin, and the Great Depression. New York: Vintage Books. ISBN 978-0-394-71628-2.
- Calhoun, Milburn (2008). Louisiana Almanac 2008–2009. New Orleans: Pelican Publishing Company. ISBN 978-1-4556-0770-9.
- Dethloff, Henry C. (1976). Huey P. Long: Southern Demagogue or American Democrat?. Lafayette, Louisiana: University of Southwestern Louisiana.
- Gillette, Michael (1970). "Huey Long and the Chaco War". Louisiana History: The Journal of the Louisiana Historical Association. 11 (4): 293–311. JSTOR 4231146. (subscription required)
- Haas, Edward F. (1991). "Huey Long and the Communists". Louisiana History: The Journal of the Louisiana Historical Association. 32 (1): 29–46. JSTOR 4232863. (subscription required)
- ——— (February 1994). "Huey Pierce Long and Historical Speculation". The History Teacher. 27 (2): 271–73. doi:10.2307/494714. JSTOR 4231135. (subscription required)
- ——— (2006). "Huey Long and the Dictators". Louisiana History: The Journal of the Louisiana Historical Association. 47 (2): 125–31. JSTOR 494714. (subscription required)
- Hamby, Alonzo L. (2004). For the Survival of Democracy: Franklin Roosevelt and the World Crisis of the 1930s. New York: Simon and Schuster. ISBN 978-0-684-84340-7.
- Hair, William Ivy (1996). The Kingfish and His Realm: The Life and Times of Huey P. Long. Baton Rouge, Louisiana: Louisiana State University Press. ISBN 978-0-8071-4106-9.
- Harris, Thomas O. (1938). The Kingfish: Huey P. Long, Dictator. New York: Pelican Publishing Company. OCLC 1089608898.
- Havard, William C.; Herberle, Rudolf; Howard, Perry H. (1963). The Louisiana Election of 1960. Baton Rouge, Louisiana: Louisiana State University. OCLC 2497787.
- Jeansonne, Glen (1980). "Challenge to the New Deal: Huey P. Long and the Redistribution of National Wealth". Louisiana History: The Journal of the Louisiana Historical Association. 21 (4): 331–39. JSTOR 4232034. (subscription required)
- ——— (Fall 1989). "The Apotheosis of Huey Long". Biography. 12 (4): 283–301. doi:10.1353/bio.2010.0636. JSTOR 23539493. S2CID 162206324. (subscription required)
- ——— (Winter 1990). "Huey P. Long: A Political Contradiction". Louisiana History: The Journal of the Louisiana Historical Association. 31 (4): 373–85. JSTOR 4232837. (subscription required)
- ——— (1992). "Huey Long and Racism". Louisiana History: The Journal of the Louisiana Historical Association. 22 (3): 265–82. JSTOR 4232958. (subscription required)
- ——— (1994). "Huey Long and The Historians". The History Teacher. 27 (2): 120–25. doi:10.2307/494713. JSTOR 494713. (subscription required)
- Kane, Thomas Harnett (1941). Huey Long's Louisiana Hayride: the American Rehearsal for Dictatorship, 1928–1940. New York: William Morrow. OCLC 678902460.
- Kennedy, David (2005) [1999]. Freedom From Fear The American People in Depression and War, 1929–1945. Oxford: Oxford University Press. ISBN 978-0-19-514403-1.
- Key, V.O.; Heard, Alexander (1949). Southern Politics in State and Nation. Knoxville, Tennessee: University of Tennessee Press.
- Kuhn, Joseph. "Flesh and the Common Man: Robert Penn Warren's Huey Long Drama." Journal of American Studies 53.4 (2019): 953-971.
- Kurtz, Michael L.; Peoples, Morgan D. (1991). Earl K. Long: The Saga of Uncle Earl and Louisiana Politics (reprint ed.). Baton Rouge, Louisiana: Louisiana State University Press. ISBN 978-0-8071-1765-1. Archived from the original on February 1, 2021.
- Long, Huey (1996) [1933]. Every Man a King: The Autobiography of Huey P. Long. New Orleans: Da Capo Press. OCLC 818855173.
- Lowe, John, ed. (2008). Louisiana Culture from the Colonial Era to Katrina. Baton Rouge, Louisiana: Louisiana State University Press. ISBN 978-0-8071-3337-8. Archived from the original on December 24, 2020.
- McGuire, Jack B. "Huey Long a Fascist?" Louisiana History 63.4 (2022): 457-472. JSTOR 27190866. McGuire, Jack B. (2022). "Huey Long a Fascist?". Louisiana History: The Journal of the Louisiana Historical Association. 63 (4): 457–472. JSTOR 27190866. Archived from the original on August 13, 2023.
- Mann, Robert. Kingfish U: Huey Long and LSU (LSU Press, 2023) online Archived October 3, 2023, at the Wayback Machine.
- Mathy, Gabriel, and Nicolas L. Ziebarth. "How much does political uncertainty matter? The case of Louisiana under Huey Long." Journal of Economic History 77.1 (2017): 90-126. online
- Moreau, John Adam (Spring 1965). "Huey Long and His Chroniclers". Louisiana History: The Journal of the Louisiana Historical Association. 6 (2): 121–39. JSTOR 4230837. (subscription required)
- Parrish, Michael E. (1994). Anxious Decades: America in Prosperity and Depression, 1920–1941. New York: W.W. Norton & Company. ISBN 978-0-393-31134-1.
- Perry, Keith (2004). The Kingfish in Fiction: Huey P. Long and the Modern American Novel. Baton Rouge, Louisiana: Louisiana State University Press. ISBN 978-0-8071-2942-5.
- Pleasant, John R. Jr. (Autumn 1974). "Ruffin G. Pleasant and Huey P. Long on the Prisoner-Stripe Controversy". Louisiana History: The Journal of the Louisiana Historical Association. 15 (4): 357–66. JSTOR 4231428. (subscription required)
- Sanson, Jerry P. (Summer 2006). ""What He Did and What He Promised to Do...": Huey Long and the Horizons of Louisiana Politics". Louisiana History: The Journal of the Louisiana Historical Association. 47 (3): 261–76. JSTOR 4234200. (subscription required)
- Seidemann, Ryan M. "Did the State Win or Lose in its Mineral Dealings with Huey Long, Oscar Allen, James Noe, and the Win or Lose Oil Company?" Louisiana History 59.2 (2018): 196-225. JSTOR 26475480; Seidemann, Ryan M. (2018). "Did the State Win or Lose in its Mineral Dealings with Huey Long, Oscar Allen, James Noe, and the Win or Lose Oil Company?". Louisiana History: The Journal of the Louisiana Historical Association. 59 (2): 196–225. JSTOR 26475480. Archived from the original on August 13, 2023.
- Snyder, Robert E. (Spring 1975). "Huey Long and the Presidential Election of 1936". Louisiana History: The Journal of the Louisiana Historical Association. 16 (2): 117–43. JSTOR 4231456. (subscription required)
- ——— (Spring 1977). "Huey Long and the Cotton-Holiday Plan of 1931". Louisiana History: The Journal of the Louisiana Historical Association. 18 (2): 133–60. JSTOR 4231670. (subscription required)
- Vaughn, Courtney (Winter 1979). "The Legacy of Huey Long". Louisiana History: The Journal of the Louisiana Historical Association. 20 (1): 93–101. JSTOR 4231871. (subscription required)
- Warren, Kenneth F. (2008). Encyclopedia of U.S. Campaigns, Elections, and Electoral Behavior: A–M. Vol. 1. Thousand Oaks, California: SAGE Publications. ISBN 978-1-4129-5489-1.
- White, Richard D. (2006). Kingfish: The Reign of Huey P. Long. New York: Random House. ISBN 978-0-8129-7383-9.
- Williams, T. Harry (1981) [1969]. Huey Long. New York: Vintage Books. ISBN 978-0-394-74790-3.
