= Every Man a King (autobiography) =

Autobiography of Huey Long

- Author: Huey Long
- Language: English
- Subject: Life of Huey Long
- Genre: Autobiography
- Publisher: National Book Company
- Publication date: 1933
- Publication place: United States
- Media type: Book
- Pages: 343
- ISBN: 9780306806957

Every Man a King (1933) is an autobiography by Huey Long, who served as the 40th governor of Louisiana and as a member of the United States Senate. Aged 39 at the time, Long would be assassinated two years later. The book explores Long's rise to power. Long's posthumously published My First Days in the White House is sometimes referred to as his "second autobiography".

== Reception ==
The book was largely criticized by the press. The New York Times Book Review claimed "There is hardly a law of English usage or a rule of English grammar that its author does not break somewhere." In the Saturday Review, Allan Nevins wrote that Long "is unbalanced, vulgar, in many ways ignorant, and quite reckless." The book had difficulty selling; only 20,000 of the 100,000 printed were sold. Long gave the rest away for free.
