= The Unreals =

2007 novel by Donald Jeffries

- First edition
- Author: Donald Jeffries
- Publisher: StoneGarden.net Publishing
- Publication date: May 1, 2007
- Pages: 432
- ISBN: 1-60076-034-1
- OCLC: 173835008

The Unreals is a science fiction/fantasy novel by Donald Jeffries, published in 2007 by StoneGarden. Conspiracy theories feature prominently in the plot, with the John F. Kennedy assassination playing an especially significant role.

Compared to The Wizard of Oz and The Twilight Zone, The Unreals has also been referred to as a conspiracy manifesto. Jeffries was heavily influenced by such books as Nineteen Eighty-Four, Dracula and A Wrinkle In Time. He also utilized his keen infatuation with old (pre-1930 era) Major League Baseball players, by sprinkling numerous obscure references to them throughout the book.

== The author ==
Donald Jeffries was born in Washington in 1956. He now lives in northern Virginia with his wife and children. The Unreals is his first novel.
