= Kenneth F. Warren =

American political scientist and pollster

Kenneth F. Warren is an authority on politics, public administration, and administrative law within the United States. Warren is a professor of political science at Saint Louis University and the president of The Warren Poll. Warren has polled for various media, government, and political clients, including former House Minority Leader Richard Gephardt.

== Media commentary ==
Warren has served as a political analyst for local, national, and international media for over 35 years. He has appeared live on CNN, CBS, ABC, MSNBC, BBC, CBC, Swedish television, Fox News, C-Span, NPR, Netherlands Radio, Japanese TV, Australian TV and radio, Swiss TV, and other media outlets. The New York Times, St. Louis Post Dispatch, The Washington Post, USA Today, The Times, The Wall Street Journal, The New Republic, The National Journal, The Economist, The Hill, Time Magazine have used Warren as a political analyst. Frequently, Warren appears as a political analyst on National Public Radio (NPR).

== Publications ==
Among other works, Warren authored "In Defense of Public Opinion Polling" (2001), U.S. Encyclopedia of Campaigns, Elections, and Electoral Behavior, editor (2008), "Administrative Law in the American Political System", 5th edition, (2011), and co-authored with Rafael Jacob, "The One That Got Away: Missouri's Break from Ultimate Swing State Status" in Swing State Politics (2015).

== Polling and research ==
Warren, as President of The Warren Poll, has been conducting surveys for political candidates, cities, school districts, non-profit organizations, states, the media, and private clients since 1980, and has specialized in community surveys since the late 1980s, conducting citizen surveys, as well as employee and business surveys, for many cities in the St. Louis area. In 2015, in a post-Ferguson project, Warren conducted exit interviews of 753 people exiting affluent and non-affluent municipal courts in Saint Louis County to find out whether poor, mostly blacks were treated more unfairly than whites. Blacks did express more negative views about how they were treated by municipal courts than whites, although both blacks and whites felt they were treated better by municipal courts located in the affluent communities than the non-affluent communities to a statistically significant extent.

== Expert witness work ==
Warren has served as an expert witness in over twenty court cases, testifying in Voting Rights Act, redistricting, forum non conveniens, jury challenges, and change of venue cases.

Dr. Kenneth F. Warren received his Ph.D. from the University of Massachusetts Amherst. He presently resides with his family in Saint Louis, Missouri.
