= Castro Carazo =

Costa Rican-born American composer

Castro Carazo (June 18, 1895 – December 28, 1981) was a Costa Rican-born American composer. He graduated from the Royal Conservatory of Music in Barcelona. Carazo collaborated on multiple songs with governor and senator Huey Long, including several of Louisiana State University's fight songs. He was also director of the LSU marching band.
